= Moliterno (surname) =

Moliterno is a surname. Notable people with the surname include:

- Eco Moliterno (born 1977), Brazilian advertising executive
- Kadu Moliterno (born 1952), Brazilian actor

== See also ==
- Moliterno, locality in Italy
- Moliterno (cheese), Italian cheese
