= Braided cheese =

Cheese wound together in a braid

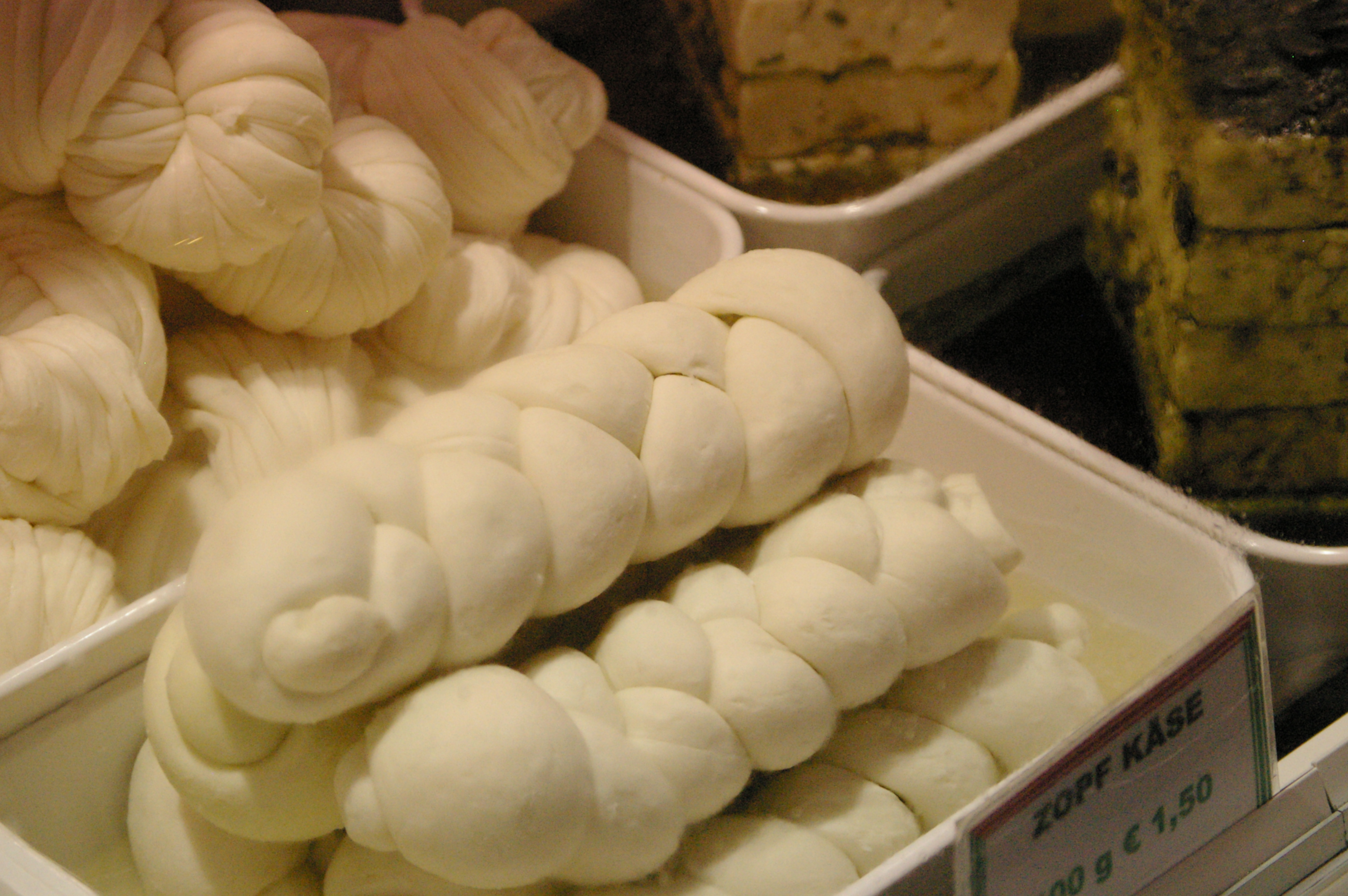
Zopfkäse, braided cheese

Braided cheese is a dairy product made from strips of highly elastic cheese wound together in a braid. Lebanon, Syria, Sudan, Turkey, Armenia, Palestine, and many Latin American nations make varieties of braided cheese. These cheeses can be used in a variety of dishes or eaten plain. Some varieties benefit from a soak in cold water, to soften the cheese, and to remove excess salt.

Syrian Akawi, Turkish Örgü peyniri and Latin American Asadero are all examples of braided cheese.

== See also ==
- String cheese
- Chechil
- List of stretch-cured cheeses
- Oaxaca cheese
- Tresse cheese
- Korbácik
