= List of stretch-curd cheeses =

Cheeses prepared using the pasta filata technique

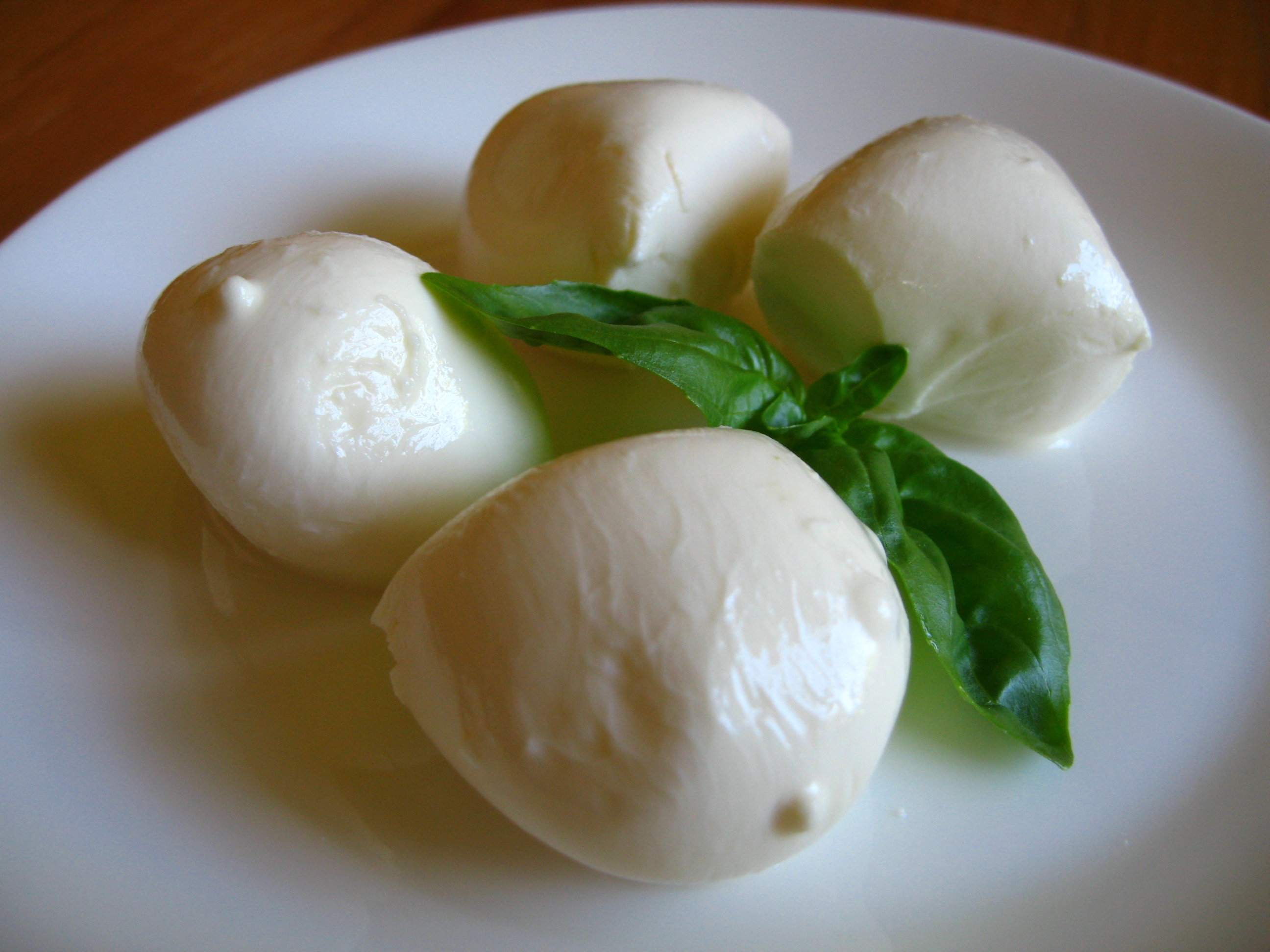
Bocconcini is a small mozzarella cheese the size of an egg.

Stretch-curd cheeses are those prepared using the pasta filata technique. They are also known as pulled-curd and plastic-curd cheeses. The cheeses manufactured from this technique undergo a plasticising and kneading treatment of the fresh curd in hot water, which gives them fibrous structures.

== Pasta filata ==
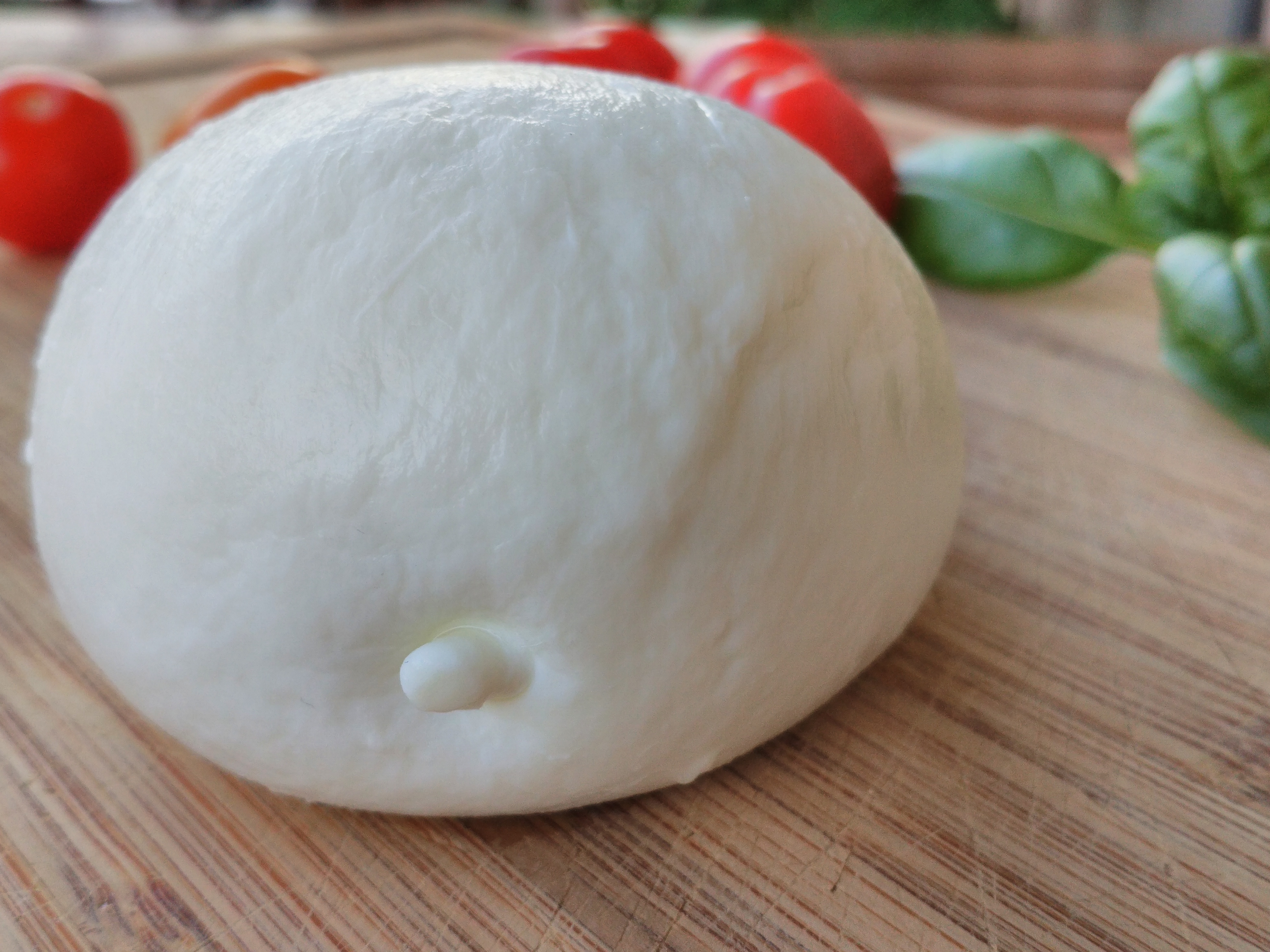
Mozzarella – a type of pasta filata

Pasta filata (lit. 'spun paste') is a technique in the manufacture of a family of Italian stretched-curd cheeses. Stretched curd cheeses manufactured using the pasta filata technique undergo a plasticising and kneading treatment of the fresh curd in hot water, which gives the cheese its fibrous structure.

The cheese-making begins in the normal way. The milk (usually from cows or water buffalo) is warmed and curdled and allowed to rest for an hour before the curds are cut into small pieces and the whey is drained off. The curds are allowed to rest for a number of hours. Then follows the filatura, which is when the curds are steeped for some hours in a bath of very hot whey, or water (for mozzarella di bufala campana the temperature is 95 °C). Once they begin to float, most of the liquid is removed and the curd is mixed and kneaded until the required soft, elastic, stringy texture is obtained. The mass of curd is divided (often by pulling out a thick strand and chopping it) and shaped into individual cheeses. In the case of mozzarella, the process is now essentially complete—ideally these cheeses should be eaten within a few days.

For other formaggi a pasta filata, such as provolone, caciocavallo silano, pallone di Gravina, burrata, and scamorza, further processing is needed: ageing and, in some cases, brining or smoking.

=== Chemistry ===
Phosphate groups attached to the casein proteins in the cheese curd are highly charged but repel each other. Naturally high levels of calcium ions are found in the casein micelles of the cheese curd and allow the casein micelles to form a more rigid network by bridging the steric hindrance created by the self-repelling phosphate groups. Calcium ions are removed during the production of pasta filata cheeses. This increases the repulsion casein micelles have against each other, allowing the micelle to become less dense and more extensible.

A relatively high amount of calcium is removed during the cheese making process, reducing the overall amount of this nutrient in mozzarella relative to other cheeses. Relative to cheddar cheese, mozzarella has 40% less calcium.

== List of stretch-curd cheeses ==
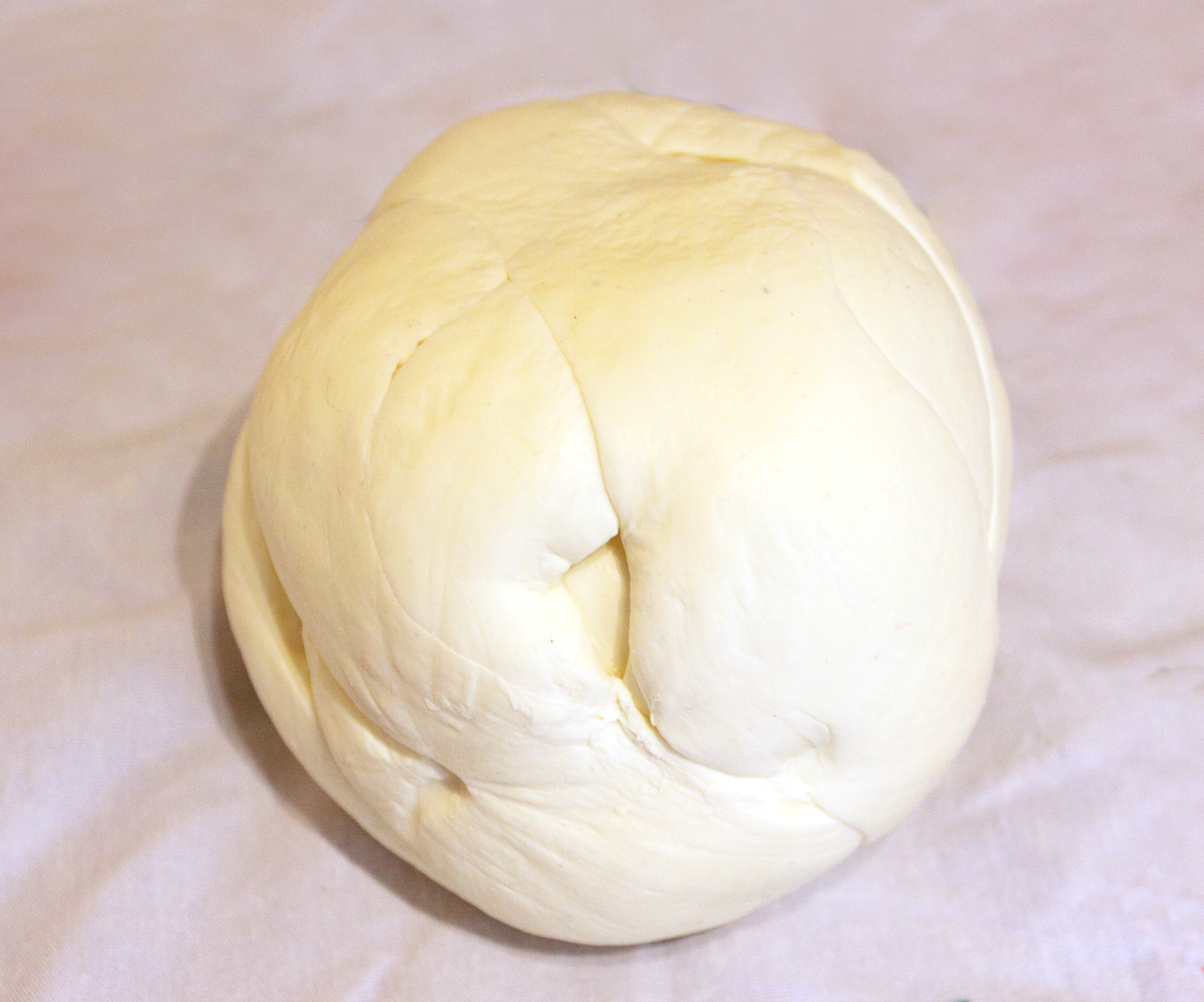
Oaxaca cheese

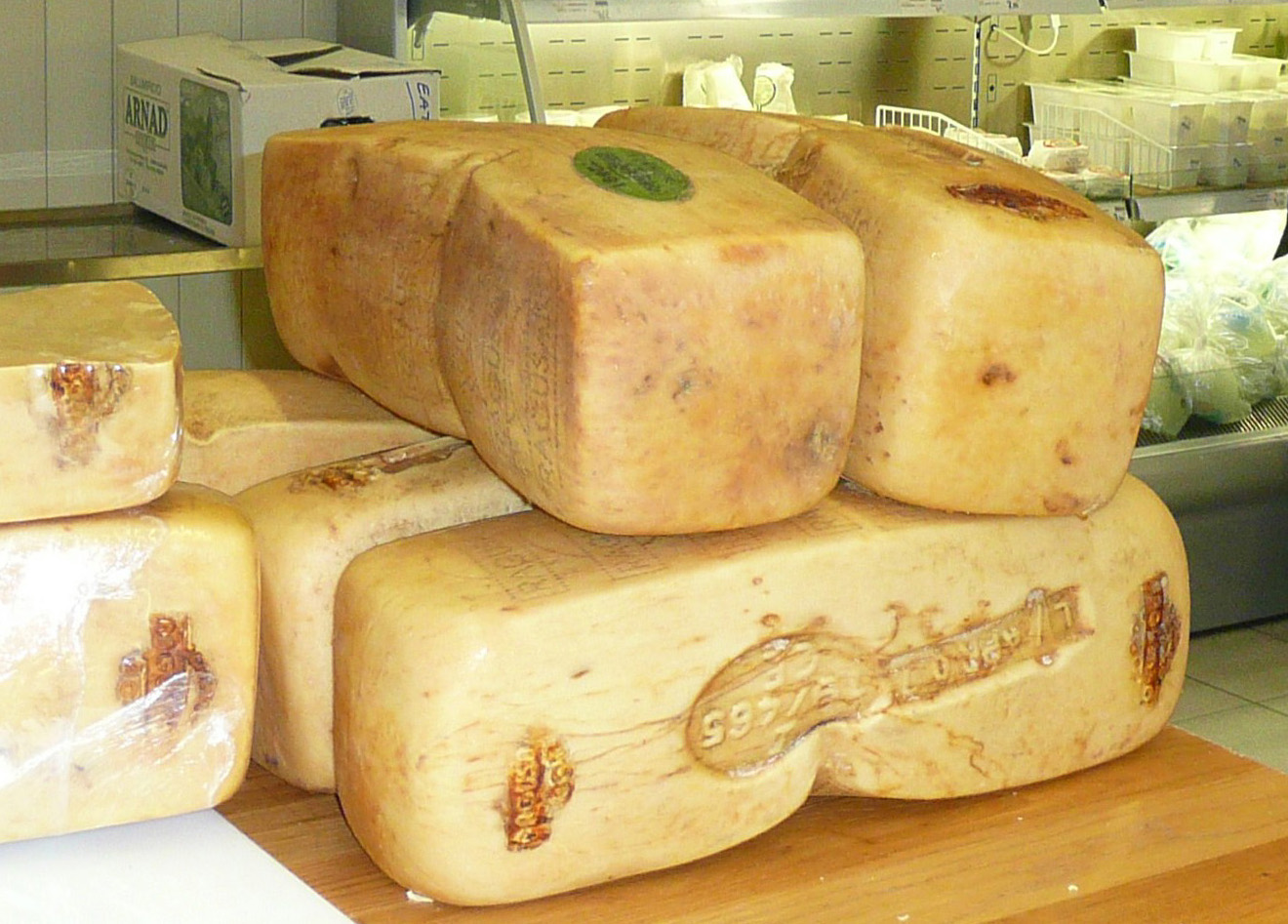
Ragusano cheese

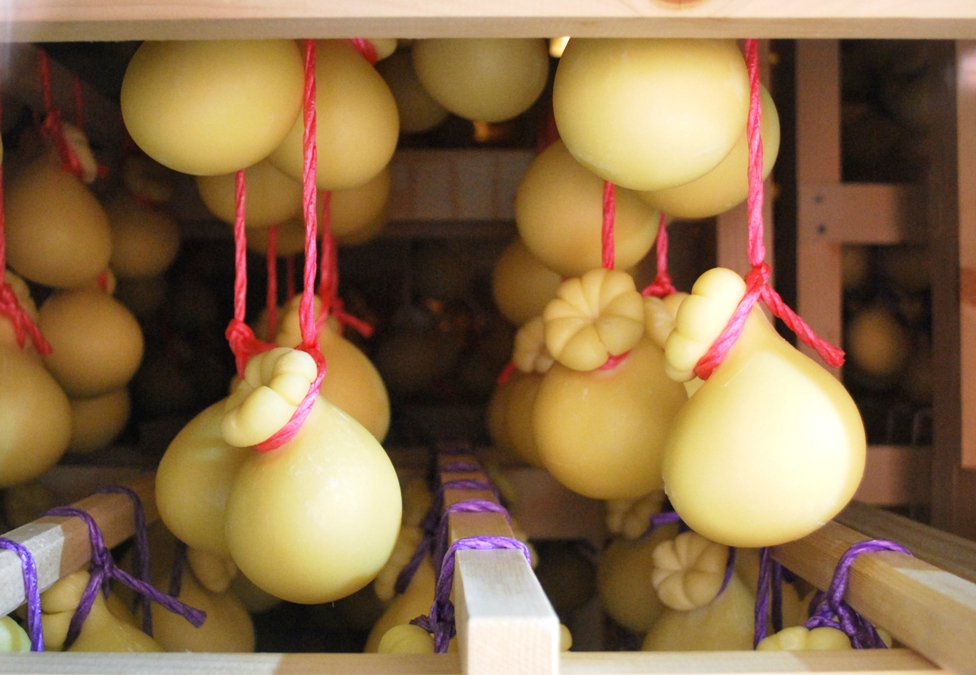
Straddled forms of caciocavallo hang to age.

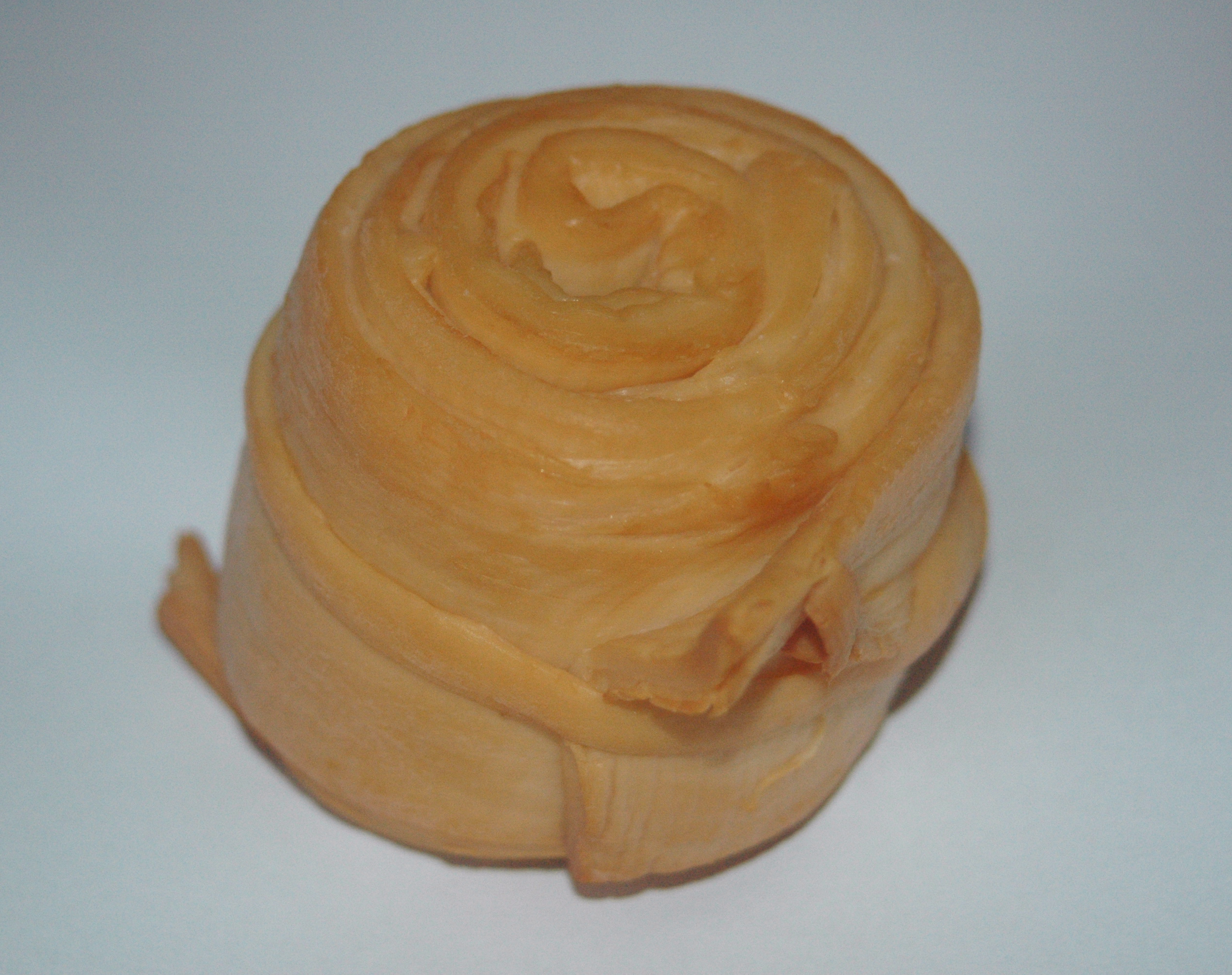
Smoked Parenica

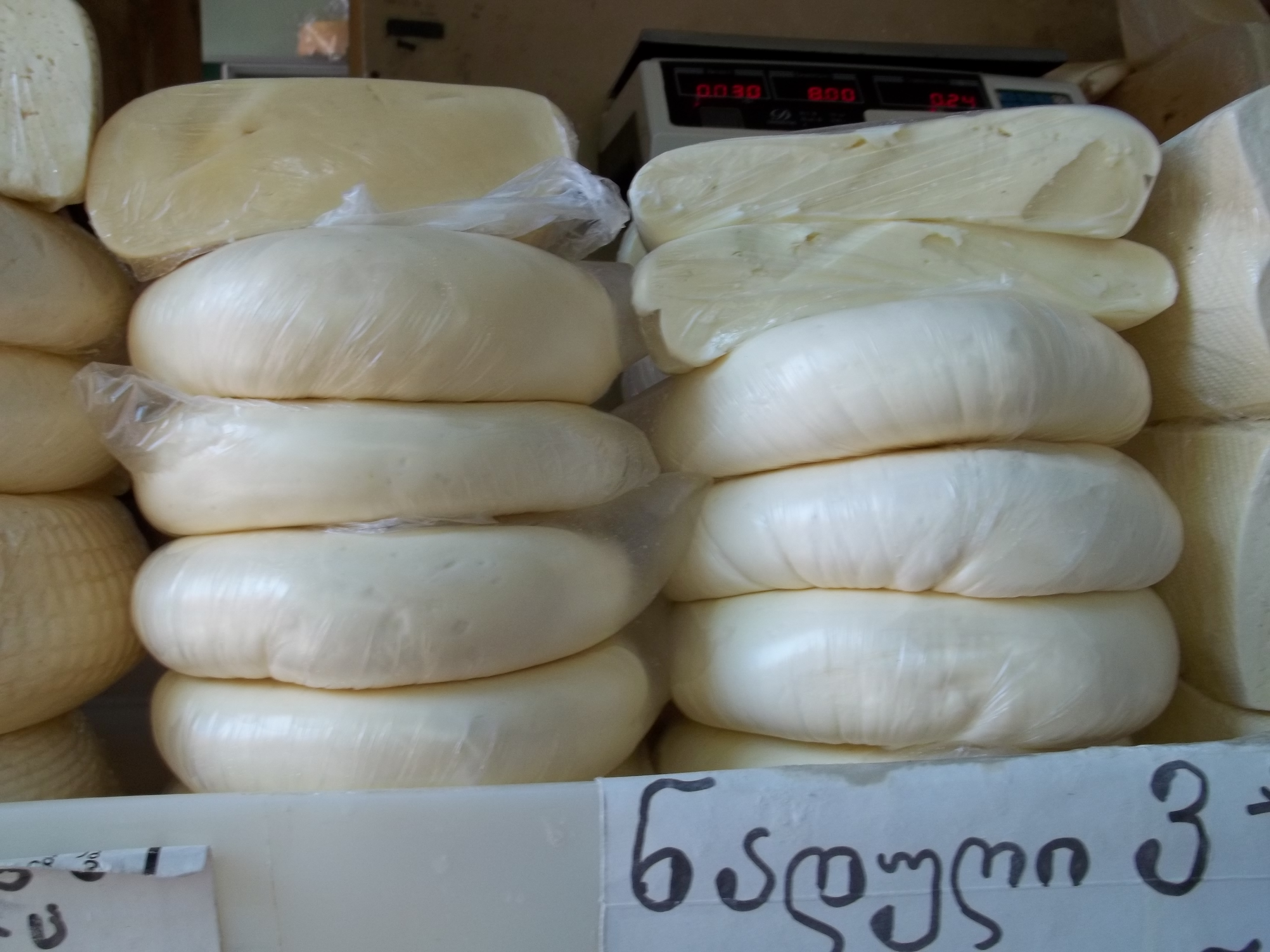
Discs of Sulguni

- Akkawi – "From Akka". a widely popular East-Mediterranean white brined cheese originating from and named after the city of Acre (Arabic "Akka"), Israel. Its texture can be compared to mozzarella, feta or a mizithra, since it does not melt easily. The texture and flavor is a result of its specific culturing from its curds that are kept together for a prolonged period longer than simpler tasting curd cheese such as Syrian cheese when akkawi is transformed into cheese.
- Braided cheese – made from strips of highly elastic cheese wound together in a braid. Turkey, Armenia, Lebanon, Syria, and many Latin American nations make varieties of braided cheese.
- Cacio figurato – a type of pasta filata cheese manufactured in Sicily, Italy made from cow's milk.
- Caciocavallo – a type of pasta filata cheese made out of sheep's or cow's milk. It is produced throughout Southern Italy, particularly in the Apennine Mountains and in the Gargano peninsula. Shaped like a tear-drop, it is similar in taste to the aged Southern Italian Provolone cheese, with a hard edible rind.
- Galbanino – a soft, mild, cheese produced by the Italian company Galbani, it most closely resembles a mild provolone cheese.
- Halloumi – a Cypriot and East-Mediterranean semihard, unripened, brined cheese made from a mixture of goat's and sheep's milk, and sometimes also cow's milk. It is set with rennet and is unusual in that no acid or acid-producing bacterium is used in its preparation.
- Kashkaval – a hard yellow cheese made of cow's milk, sheep's milk, or both. It dates to the 11th and 12th centuries, and is popular in several Mediterranean countries.
- Moliterno – produced in a similar manner to caciocavallo
- Mozzarella – a traditionally southern Italian dairy product made by the pasta filata method. Mozzarella received a Traditional Speciality Guaranteed certification from the European Union in 1998. This protection scheme requires that mozzarella sold in the European Union is produced according to a traditional recipe.
  - Bocconcini – small mozzarella cheese the size of an egg, it is prepared in the pasta filata manner by dipping curds into hot whey, and kneading, pulling and stretching.
  - Buffalo mozzarella is made from the milk of Mediterranea Italiana buffalo. It is traditionally manufactured in Campania, especially in the provinces of Caserta and Salerno.
- Oaxaca cheese – a white, semihard cheese from Mexico, similar to un-aged Monterey Jack, but with a mozzarella-like string cheese texture. The production process is complicated and involves stretching the cheese into long ribbons and rolling it up like a ball of yarn.
- Oscypek – a smoked cheese made using salted sheep's milk and some cow's milk that is made exclusively in the Tatra Mountains region of Poland. Unpasteurized salted sheep's milk is first turned into cottage cheese, which is then repeatedly rinsed with boiling water and squeezed. After this, the mass is pressed into wooden, spindle-shaped forms in decorative shapes. The forms are then placed in a brine-filled barrel for a night or two, after which they are placed close to the roof in a special wooden hut and cured in hot smoke for up to 14 days.
- Oštiepok – a traditional smoked sheep's milk cheese made in Slovakia; it is a protected trade name under the EU's protected geographical indication.
- Pallone di Gravina – a firm cow's milk cheese from the regions of Basilicata and Apulia in southeast Italy. It is made in the pasta filata style weighing between 1.5 and 2.5 kg (3.3 and 5.5 lb), in a pear-like shape, ball, or balloon (pallone), and was traditionally produced in the area of the city of Gravina, in the Murgia area of the province of Bari. Today, however, production is centered in the province of Matera.
- Palmito cheese – a semi-hard cow's milk cheese from Costa Rica.
- Parenica – a protected trade name under the EU's protected geographical indication, it is a traditional Slovak cheese that is semifirm, nonripening, semifat, steamed, and usually smoked, although a nonsmoked version is also produced.
- Provatura – a fresh cheese from Lazio made from buffalo milk.
- Provolone – an aged semihard Italian pasta filata cheese originating in Casilli near Vesuvius, where it is still produced in pear, sausage, or cone shapes varying from 10 to 15 centimetres (4 to 6 inches) long. Its taste varies significantly, from provolone piccante (sharp/piquant), aged for a minimum of four months and with a very sharp taste, to provolone dolce (sweet) with a very mild taste. In provolone piccante, the distinctive piquant taste is produced with lipase (enzyme) derived from goat. The Dolce version uses calf's lipase instead.
  - Provoleta – An Argentine variant on provolone. Firm enough to hold its shape when heated; frequently grilled.
- Queso de mano – Venezuelan soft, white cheese.
- Ragusano cheese – an Italian cow's milk cheese produced in Ragusa, in Sicily in southern Italy. It is a firm stretched-curd cheese made with whole milk from cows of the Modicana breed, raised exclusively on fresh grass or hay in the provinces of Ragusa and Syracuse. The cheese was awarded Italian Denominazione di Origine Controllata protection in 1955 and EU DOP status in 1995.
- Scamorza – an Italian stretched-curd cow's milk cheese, it can also be made from other milks, but this is less common. In its preparation, the fresh curd matures in its own whey for several hours to allow acidity to develop by the process of lactose being converted to lactic acid. Artisanal cheese makers generally form the cheese into a round shape, and then tie a string around the mass one-third of the distance from the top, and hang to dry. The resulting shape is pear-like.
- Stracciata – a fresh cow's milk pasta filata cheese produced in Italy, it is formed into flat strips of about 4–5 cm wide, 1 cm thick, and folded in on itself in a uniform manner or woven wire. The name stracciata means "tattered" in Italian.
- Stracciatella di bufala – a cheese produced from Italian buffalo milk in the province of Foggia, located in the southern Italian region of Apulia, using a stretching and a shredding technique.
- String cheese refers to several different types of cheese whose manufacturing process aligns the proteins in the cheese, which makes it stringy.
  - Chechil is a brine string cheese that originated in Armenia. It has a consistency approximating that of mozzarella or sulguni, and is produced in the form of dense strings, rolled up in a figure eight of thick braid-shaped ropes.
  - Korbáčik is a type of semihard or medium hard string cheese interwoven into fine braids. It originates from the Orava region of northern Slovakia. The two main variants of Korbáčik are smoked and unsmoked.
- Sulguni – a brined Georgian cheese from the Samegrelo region. It has a sour, moderately salty flavor, a dimpled texture, and an elastic consistency; these attributes are the result of the process used, and the source of its moniker "pickle cheese". The fried cheese is a popular dish in Georgia.
- Vastedda della Valle del Belice – one of the very few spun paste sheep's milk cheeses. Produced in western Sicily, between the provinces of Palermo, Trapani and Agrigento, in the territories of the Valle del Belice.

== Gallery ==
Stretch-curd cheeses

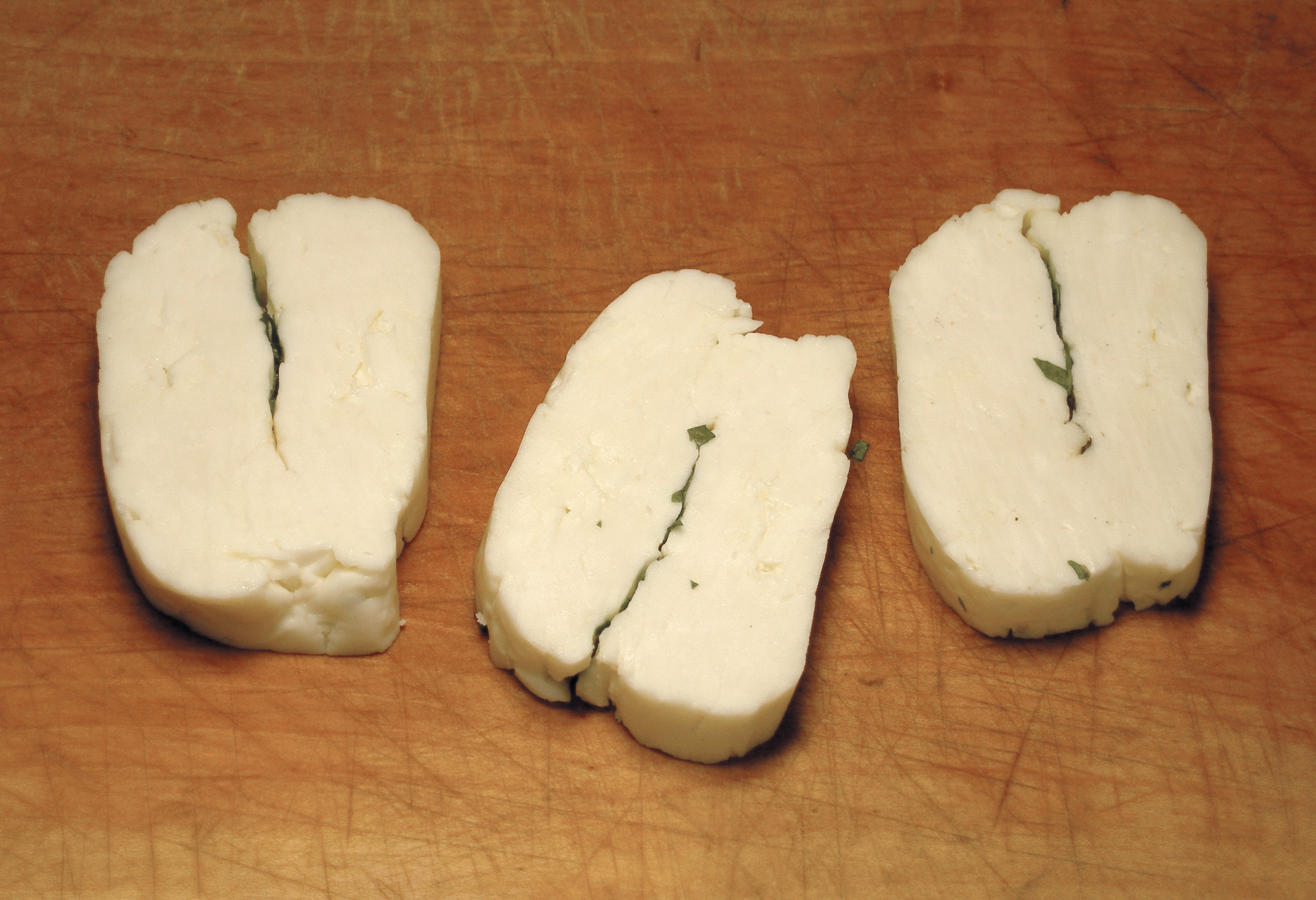
Halloumi

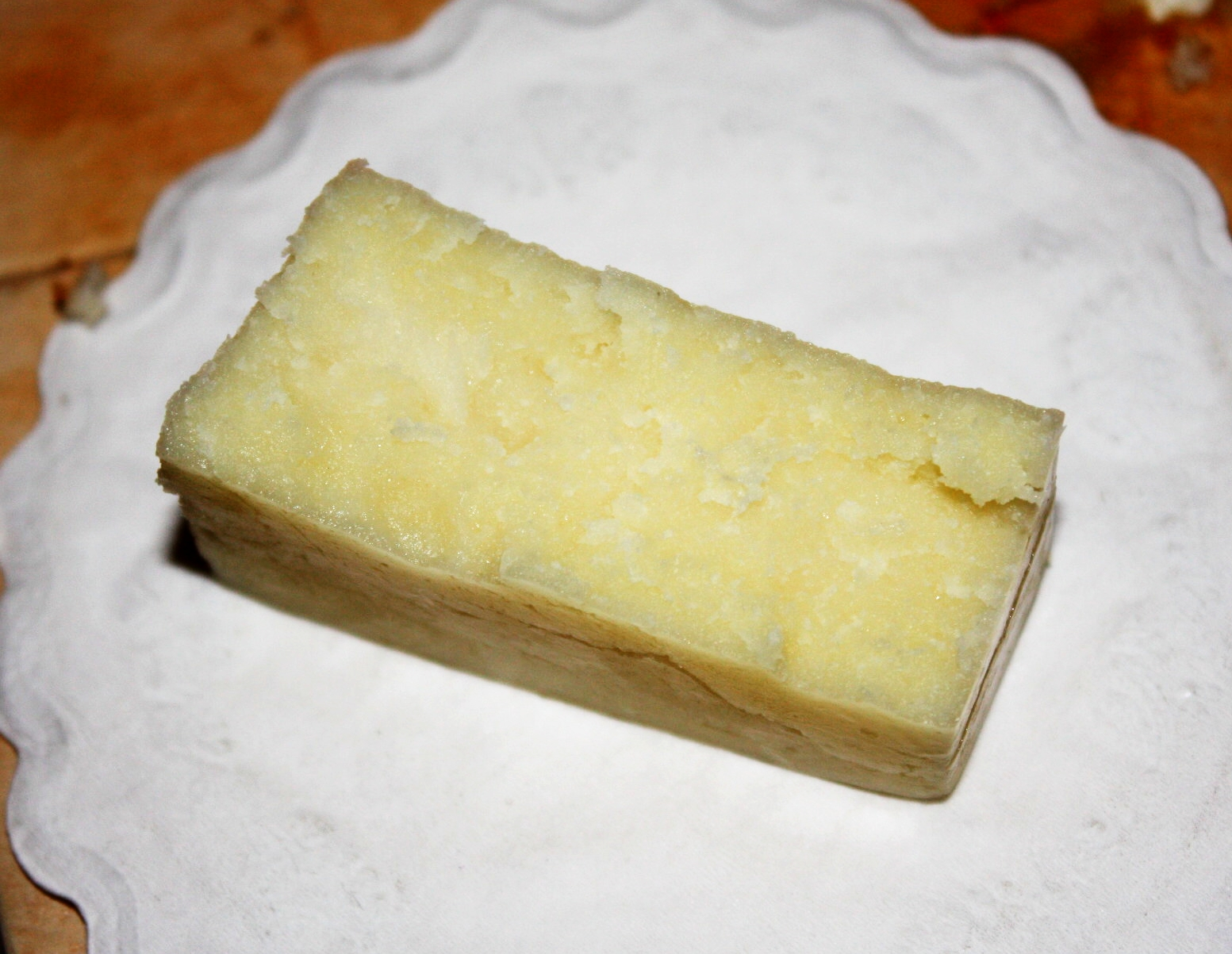
Kashkaval

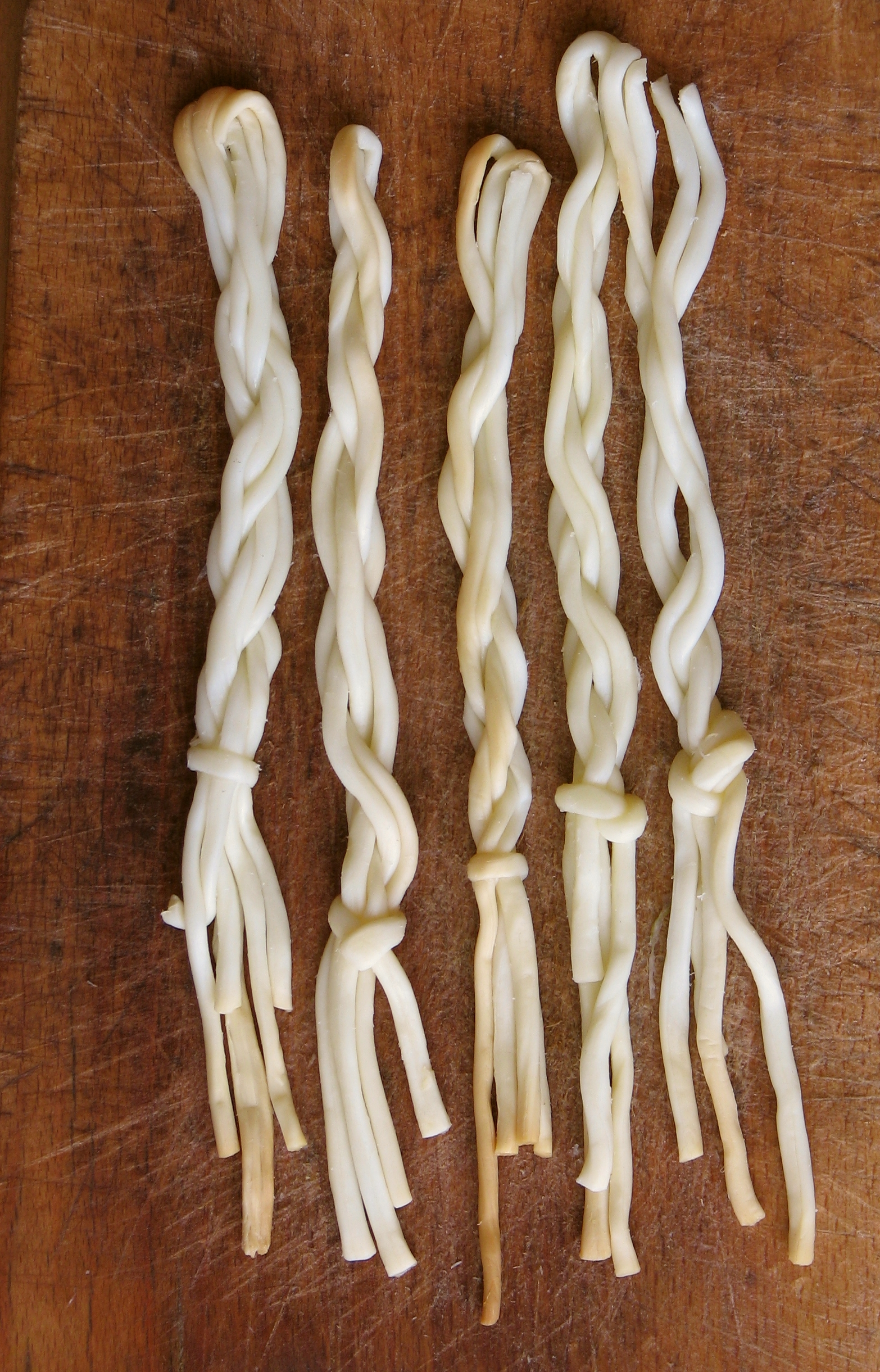
Korbáčik is a type of braided cheese.

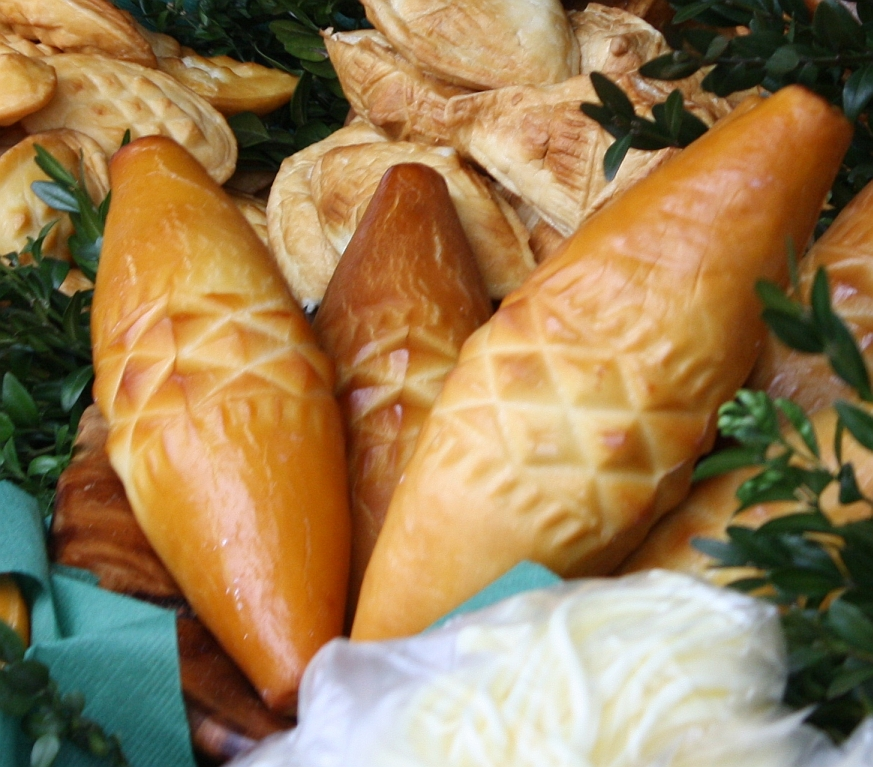
Traditional Oscypek

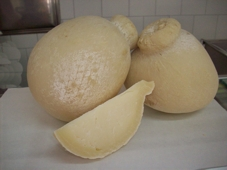
Pallone di Gravina

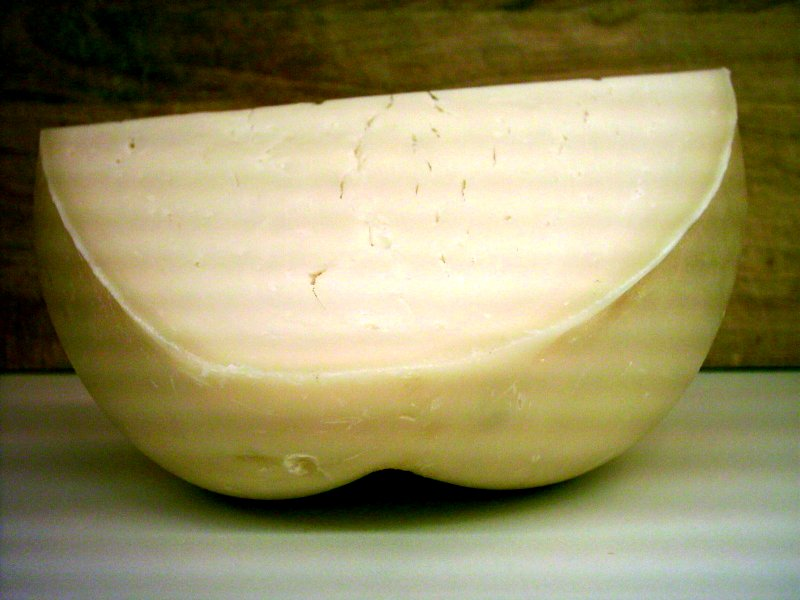
Provolone dolce (sweet provolone)

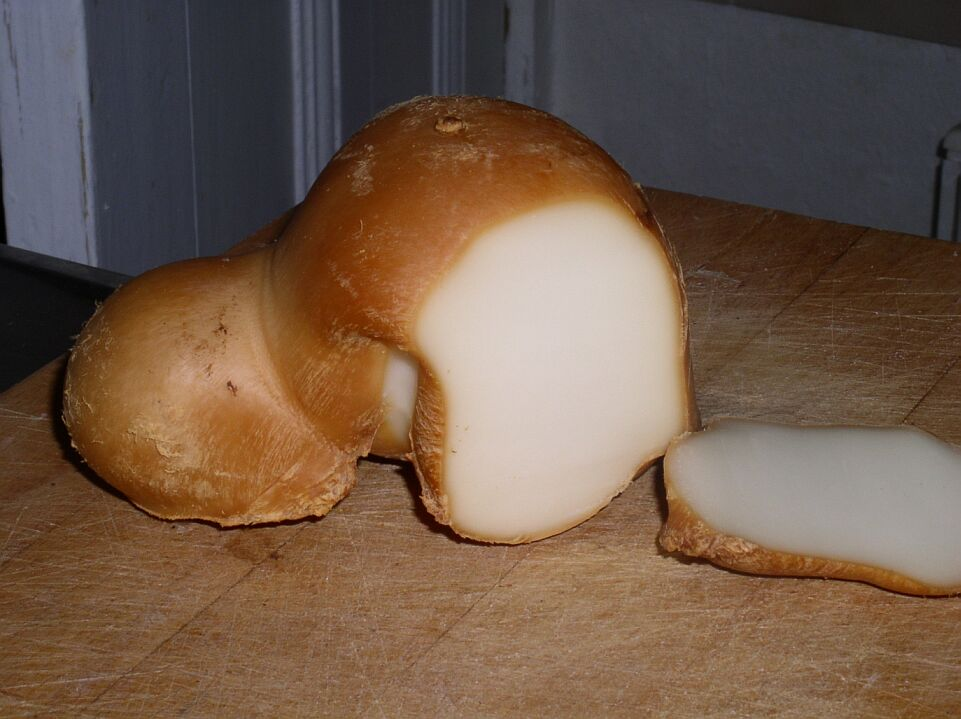
Scamorza

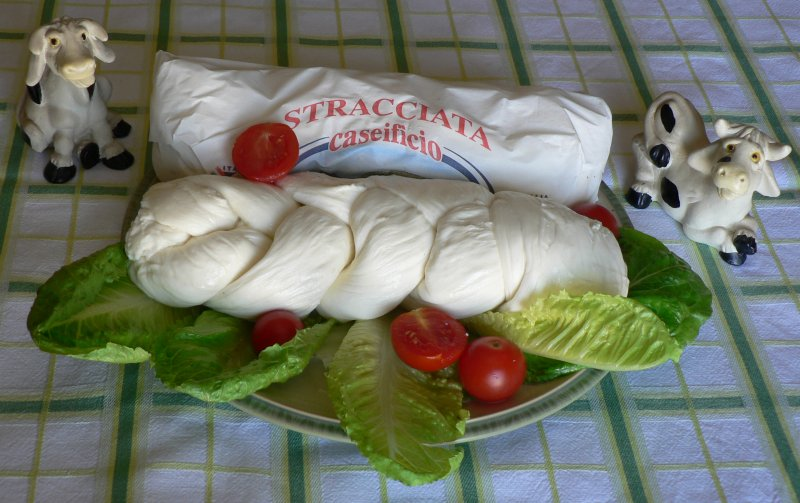
Stracciata

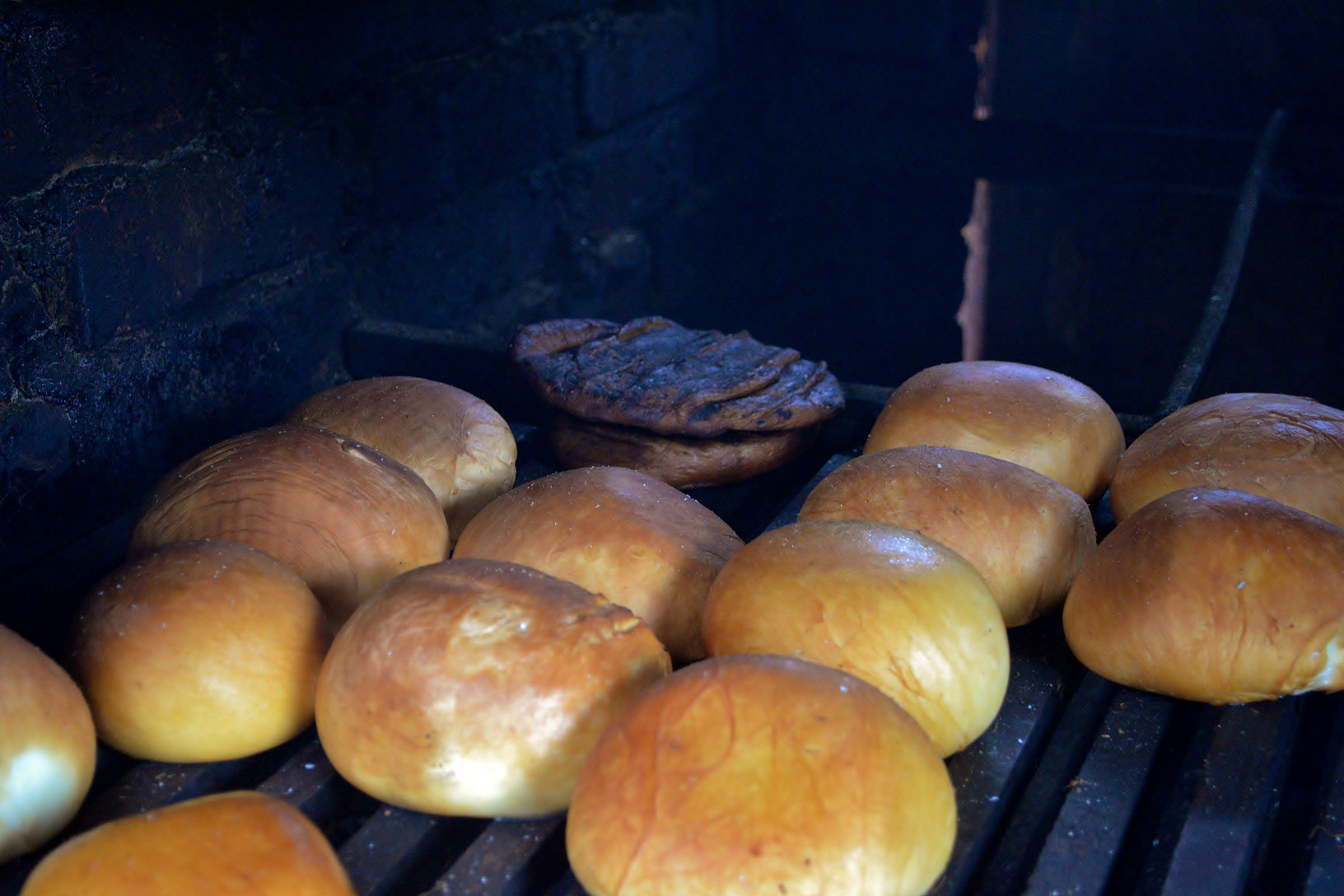
Sulguni being smoked

== See also ==
- Cheesemaking – Craft of making cheese
- List of cheeses
  - List of Italian cheeses
- Types of cheese – Classification of coagulated milk products
