= Oštiepok =

Traditional smoked sheep milk cheese made in Slovakia

Oštiepok (Slovak; plural: oštiepky) is a traditional smoked sheep milk cheese made in Slovakia. Oštiepok is a protected trade name under the EU's protected geographical indication.

A similar cheese is made by Gorals under the name Oscypek. The cheeses differ in ingredients' ratios, cheesemaking process and the characteristics of the final products.

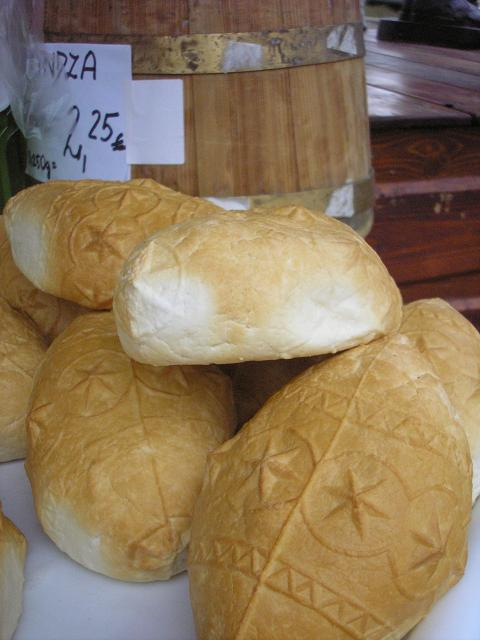
Oštiepok cheese

== See also ==
- Žinčica – drink made of sheep's milk whey
- Parenica – traditional Slovak cheese
- Slovak cuisine
- List of smoked foods
- List of stretch-curd cheeses
