= Tresse cheese =

Syrian string-cheese

Tresse
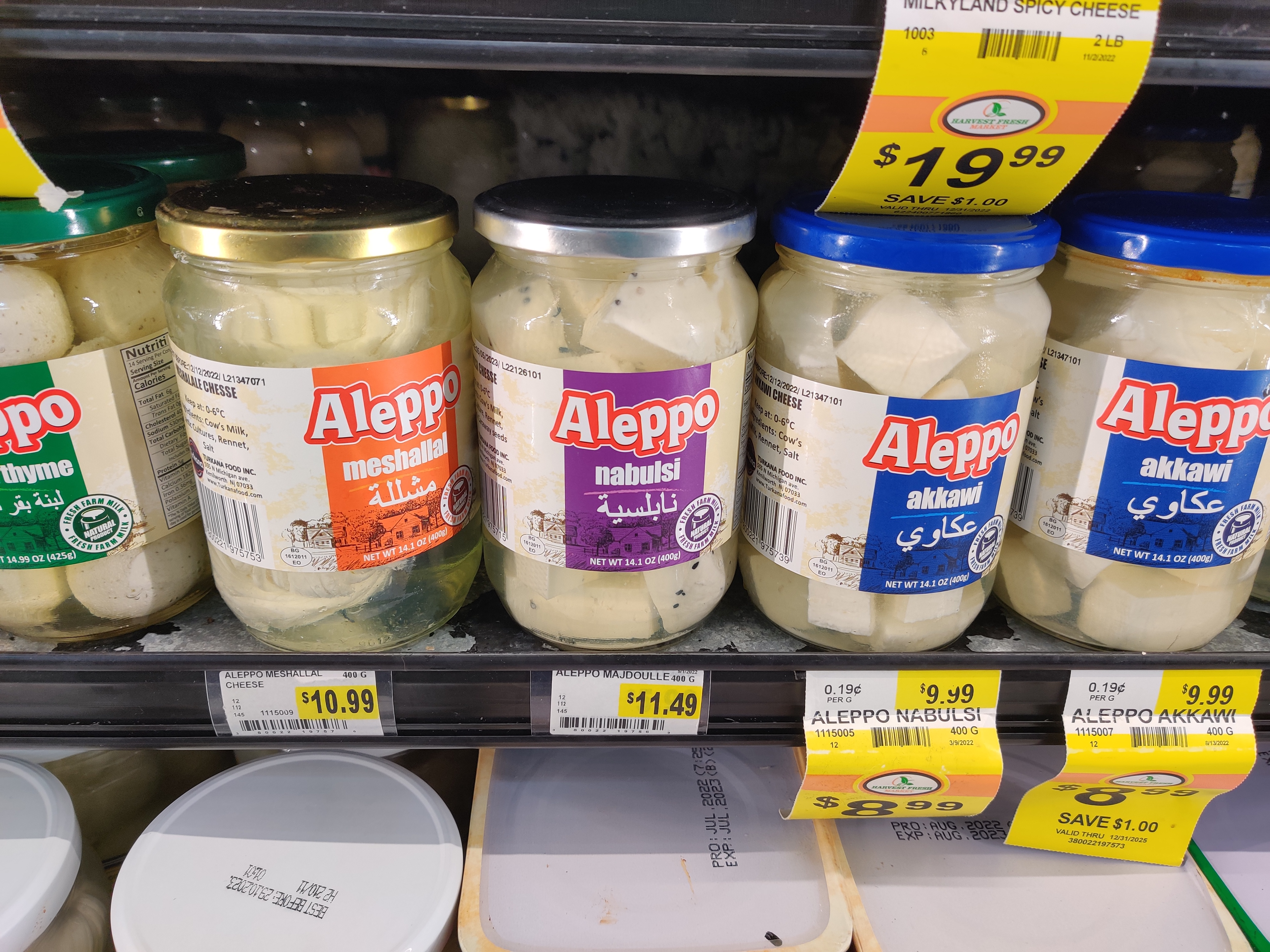
- Meshallal cheese on a store shelf (second from left)
- Other names: Mshallaleh
- Country of origin: Syria
- Texture: Semi-soft

Tresse cheese, also known as jibneh mshallaleh (Arabic: جبنة مشللة), is a form of string cheese originating in Syria. It can be eaten plain, or mixed with pastries.

The cheese is properly mixed with mahleb, which is often mixed with Nigella sativa (black cumin), anise or caraway seeds. It is soaked in brine for several weeks before being braided.

Described as a "fine white semi-soft smooth and springy cheese...similar to mozzarella" with a "nutty" aroma, it is traditionally made from cow's milk, but variations are found with sheep or goat milk. It can be used as a substitute for Mexican Oaxaqueno cheese.

== Availability ==
Canadian versions of the cheese are produced by Fromagerie Marie Kade in Boisbriand, Quebec.

== See also ==
- List of cheeses
- Tel panir
- Chechil
