= Ragusano cheese =

Italian cheese

Ragusano
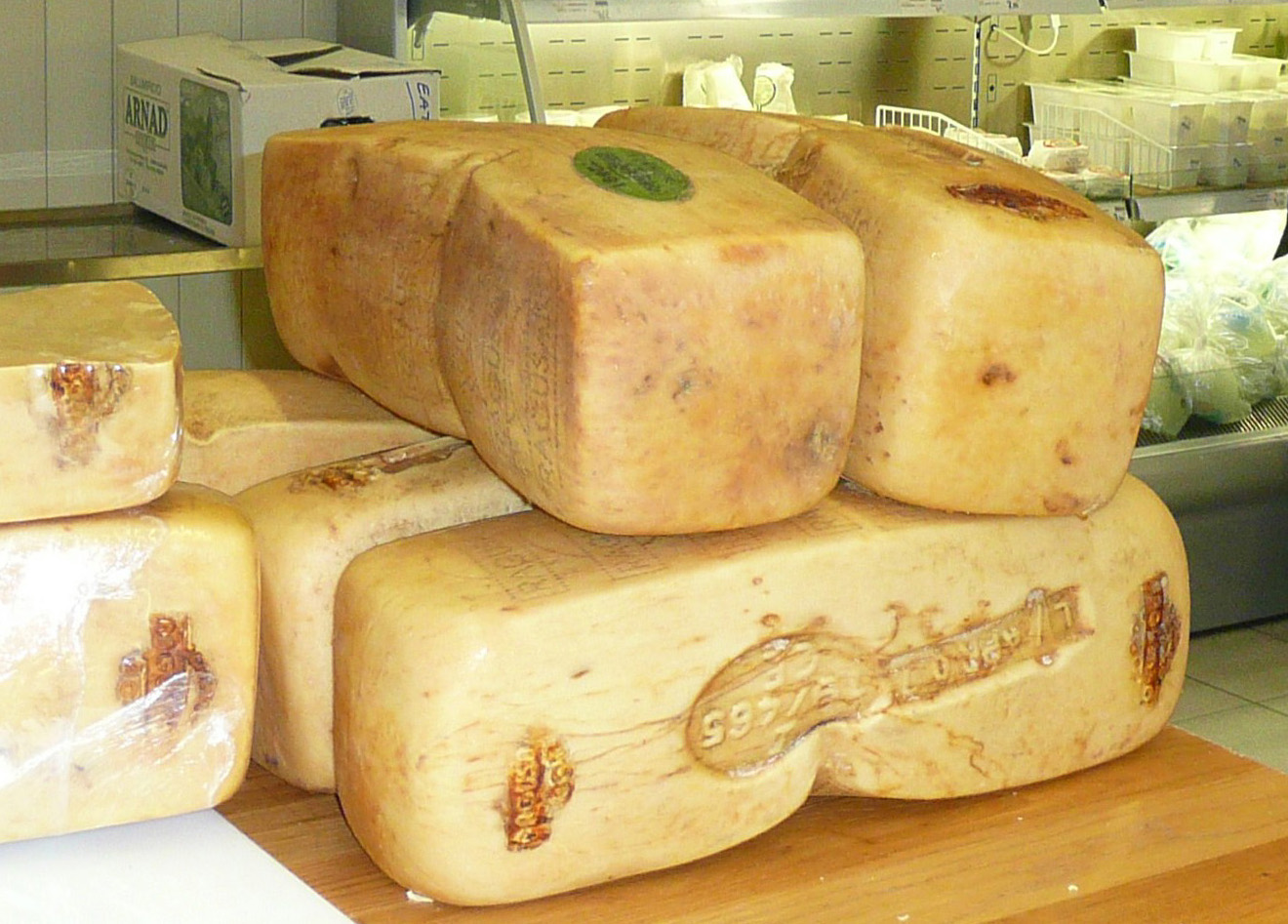
- Country of origin: Italy
- Region: Sicily (provinces of Ragusa and Syracuse)
- Source of milk: Modicana cow's milk
- Certification: DOC: 1955; PDO: 1995

Ragusano is an Italian cow's-milk cheese produced in the provinces of Ragusa and Syracuse. It is a firm pasta filata ('stretched-curd') cheese made with whole milk from cows of the Modicana breed, raised exclusively on fresh grass or hay in the provinces of Ragusa and Syracuse.

The cheese was awarded Italian denominazione di origine controllata (DOC) protection in 1955 and EU protected designation of origin (PDO) status in 1995.

== See also ==
- List of Italian cheeses
- List of stretch-curd cheeses
