= Stracciata =

Italian cheese

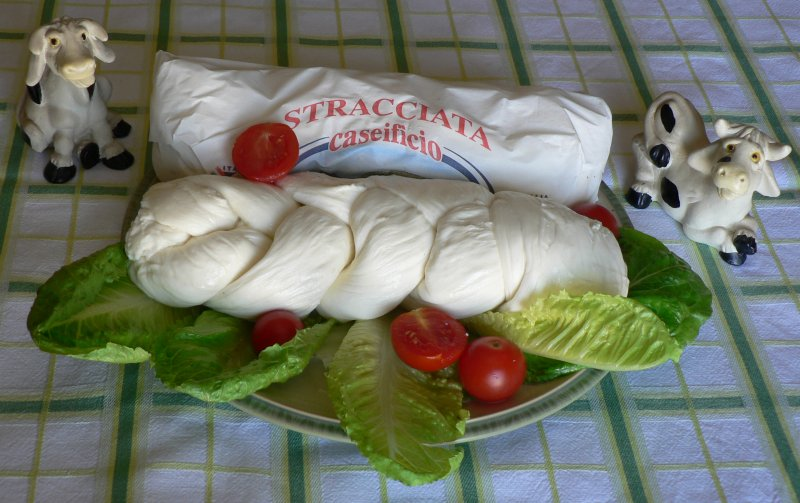
- Country of origin: Italy
- Region: Molise
- Town: Agnone, Capracotta, Carovilli, Vastogirardi
- Source of milk: Cow
- Pasteurised: Yes

Stracciata is a fresh pasta filata cheese produced in Italy. Stracciata is formed into flat strips of about 4–5 cm wide, 1 cm thick and folded in on itself in a uniform manner or woven wire, made with cow's milk. The name stracciata means "tattered" in Italian.

== Production ==
Stracciata is produced in the municipalities of Agnone, Capracotta, Carovilli and Vastogirardi with milk from local breeds of cattle, mostly kept at pasture and fed with fodder. The milk from the evening milking and morning in the boiler is heated, to a variable temperature of 36–38 °C (97–100 °F), depending on the weather.

== History ==
There are three types of PAT-certified stracciata: one from the region of Molise, one from the region of Campania, and one from Matese in the Apennines.

== See also ==
- List of cheeses
- List of stretch-curd cheeses
