= Scamorza =

Italian cheese

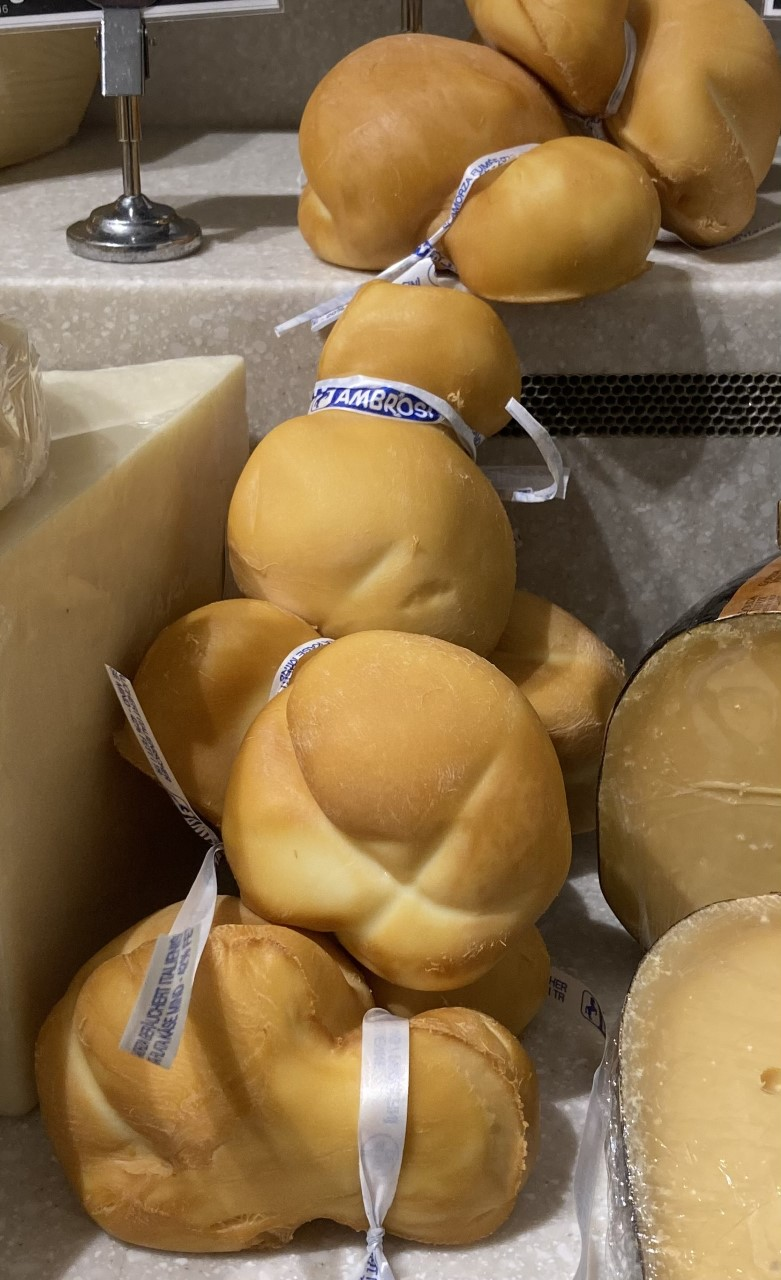
- Country of origin: Italy
- Region: Abruzzo; Apulia; Basilicata; Calabria; Campania; Molise
- Source of milk: Cow
- Pasteurized: Yes
- Texture: Elastic, stringy
- Certification: Prodotti agroalimentari tradizionali (PAT): 1996

Scamorza (Italian: [skaˈmɔrtsa]) is a southern Italian cheese made from cow's milk, or less commonly from milk of other species. It is a pasta filata cheese, in which the fresh curd is left in its own whey for several hours to allow the acidity to develop as lactose converts to lactic acid. Artisanal cheese makers generally form the cheese into a round shape, then tie a string around the mass one-third of the distance from the top, before hanging it to dry, leaving the resulting cheese in a pear-like shape. This process is sometimes referred to as "strangling" the cheese.

Scamorza is usually white, but when smoked the cheese has an almond colour with a lighter interior. Scamorza can be substituted for mozzarella in most dishes.

The term may come from the Italian phrases capa mozza or testa mozzata, both meaning 'severed head'. This would also explain the use of scamorza in regional Italian to mean 'fool' or 'idiot'.

In Italy, scamorza is more commonly made in the south. Strictly speaking, scamorza is a product of Apulia and Calabria regions. However, it is available across the country, both in the unsmoked and smoked forms. Mario Batali cites grilled scamorza (scamorza alla griglia) as a traditional dish in Neapolitan cuisine, as does food writer Arthur Schwartz, who attests that some Campanians consider the dish to be "as good as, if not better than, grilled meat". In Bari scamorza is made from sheep's milk.

== See also ==
- List of Italian cheeses
- List of stretch-curd cheeses
- List of smoked foods
