= Galbanino =

Italian cheese

Galbanino is a soft, mild, cheese produced by the Italian company Galbani. It most closely resembles a mild provolone cheese.

== See also ==
- List of Italian cheeses
- List of stretch-curd cheeses
