= Caci figurati =

Italian cheese

Caci figurati is a type of pasta filata cheese manufactured in Sicily, Italy, made from cow's milk.

== See also ==
- List of Italian cheeses
