= Pallone di Gravina =

Italian cheese from Basilicata and Apulia

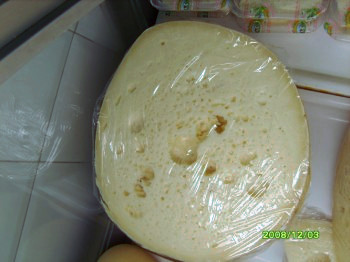
Pallone di Gravina cheeses aged for nine months

The pallone di Gravina is a firm, semi-hard, cow's milk cheese from the regions of Basilicata and Apulia, in south-east Italy. It is made in the pasta filata style weighing between 1.5 and 2.5 kg (3.3 and 5.5 lb), in a pear-like shape, ball or balloon (pallone), and was traditionally produced in the area of the city of Gravina, in the Murgia area of the province of Bari. Today, however, production is centred on the province of Matera.

In 2016 the comune of Gravina made an application for the cheese to receive PDO status within the European Union. In 2012 has been recognized as Slow Food Presidia, from Slow Food International organization, thanks to the work made by Mr. Antonio Cucco Fiore, MBA.

== Description ==
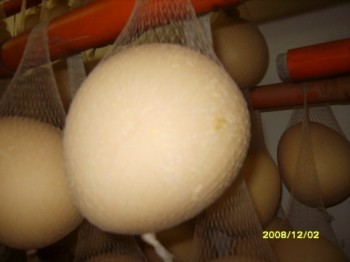
The characteristic shape of the pallone di Gravina aged for 4 months

The rind is hard, smooth and straw-coloured, becoming browner with age; the body, firm in texture, and also starts out straw-yellow, but turns golden as the cheese matures. Pallone di Gravina is at its best after being aged for at least twelve months.

The basic ingredient is full cream cow's milk, which may be pasteurised or not, and may come from one or two milkings. The curdling agent can be liquid calves' rennet or a paste derived from the stomachs of kid goats or lambs. The third ingredient is salt.

== Production ==
The method of production is similar to that of caciocavallo. The milk is warmed and curdled with the rennet and the curds are placed in a tompagno: a perforated basket similar to a colander. After two or three hours, when the required level of acidity has been reached, the coagulate is sliced up and "spun" in hot water (See pasta filata). The pieces are then moulded by hand into their characteristic shape. After salting in brine for 12 to 20 hours (depending on their size), the "balloons" are set to dry for 15 days in the dairy where they were shaped, and then transferred to the cellar to mature.

== See also ==
- List of cheeses
- List of stretch-curd cheeses – Cheeses prepared using the pasta filata technique
