= Chechil =

Brined string cheese

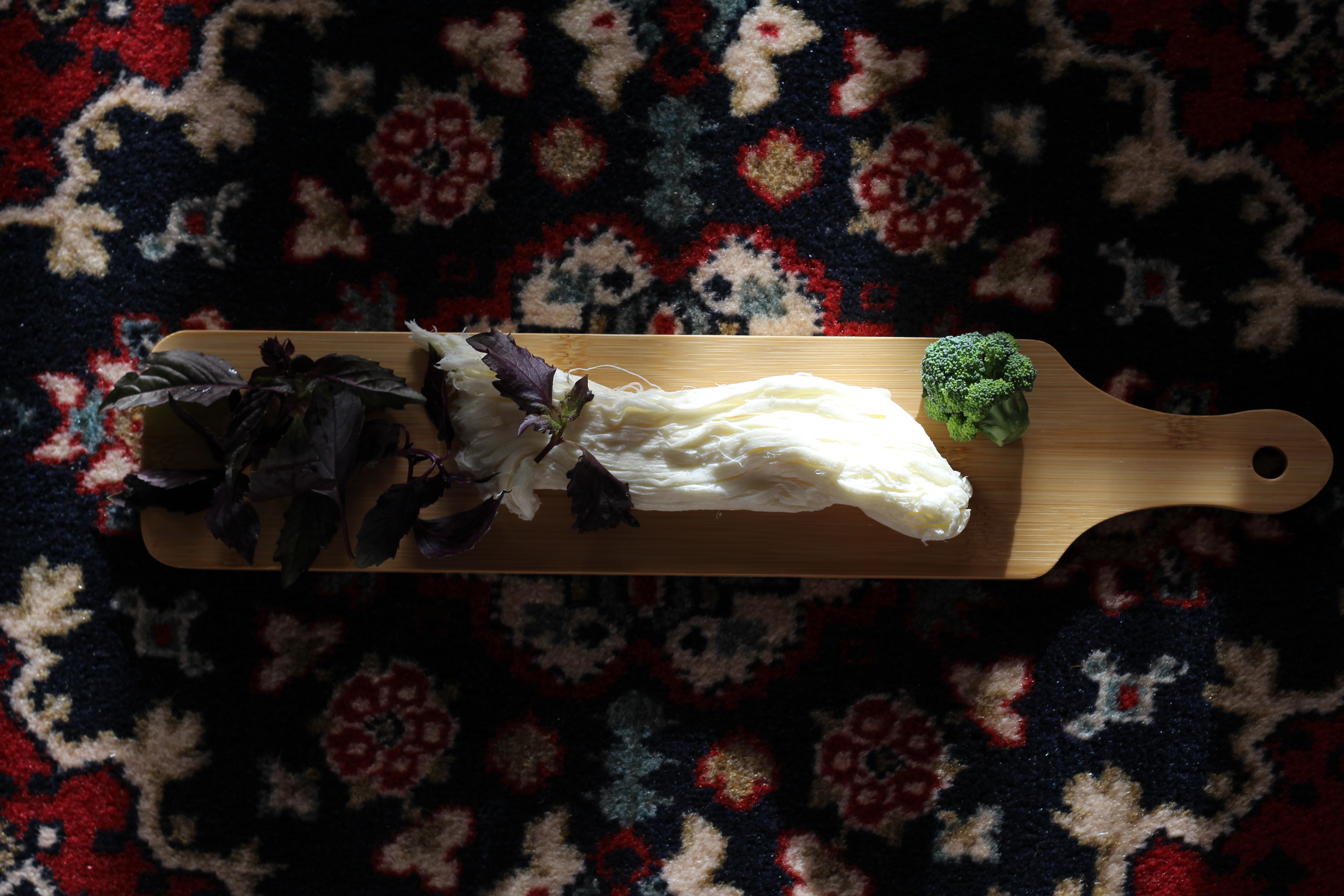
- Other names: See here
- Region: Shirak (Armenia), Meskheti and Achara (Georgia), Erzurum (Turkey)
- Source of milk: Cow, sheep, goat (mainly skimmed cow's milk)
- Pasteurized: Sometimes
- Texture: Stringy, braided, or bundled
- Fat content: Up to 10% in dry matter
- Weight: 3–4 kg per coil
- Aging time: Fresh or brined

Chechil (Note: Armenian: չեչիլ, Armenian pronunciation: [t͡ʃʰɛˈt͡ʃʰil]) (also chechili) (Note: Georgian: ჩეჩილი) is a brined string cheese primarily made from skimmed cow's milk, though it can also be produced from mixtures of cow, sheep, and goat milk. It is a pasta filata-type cheese that is pulled into thin strings and typically formed into braids.

Chechil is similar to mozzarella. It occupies an intermediate position between rennet- and acid-set cheeses and is sometimes classified as a sulguni-type cheese. The cheese is popular in Armenia and Georgia.

== Etymology, names and origin ==
The word ჩეჩილი (chechili) in Georgian directly means "[something] that is unraveled/separated", which derives from the Georgian verb ჩეჩვა (chechva), meaning "to tear apart" or "to unravel or "to separate". The root ჩეჩ- (chech-) conveys the act of pulling apart, unraveling or shredding, while the suffix -ილი (-ili) is a common Georgian nominal suffix that acts as a resultative participle that forms nouns from verbs, often denoting a resulting state or characteristic. The verb chechva ("to tear/shred") also gives rise to the past participle forms dachechili ("torn") and gachechili ("shredded") when combined with a preverb, while chechili is the form without a preverb and belongs to the oldest layer of Georgian agricultural terminology.

In Armenian, the word chil literally means "lean" or "stringy", and chechil translates as "that separates into threads" (թել-թել բաժանվող). Other names are also used in Armenian, such as chechil panir, (Note: Armenian: չեչիլ պանիր, lit. 'chechil cheese') tel panir, (Note: Armenian: թել պանիր, lit. 'string cheese', Armenian pronunciation: [tʰɛl pɑˈniɾ]) husats panir, (Note: Armenian: հյուսած պանիր, lit. 'braided cheese') chil panir, (Note: Armenian: ճիլ պանիր, lit. 'lean, stringy, made up of thin threads') as well as chivil panir. (Note: Armenian: ճիւիլ պանիր The term ճիւիլ (jivil/chivil) is recorded in the Karin dialect of Western Armenian, while the form ճիվել (jivel/chivel) appears in the Khotorjur dialect.)

In Russian, the cheese is known as syr-kosichka. (Note: Russian: сыр-косичка, lit. 'braided cheese') In Turkish, the cheese is referred to as çeçil, civil peyniri, saçak, tel, dil, or örgü cheese.

The Brockhaus and Efron Encyclopedic Dictionary mentions the cheese chil (or tchil), identifying these names as Armenian terms. The Oxford Companion to Cheese lists chechil panir as an Armenian cheese. The cheese is also referred to as twisted string cheese.

== History ==
According to the 19th-century Brockhaus and Efron Encyclopedic Dictionary, the cheese chil (or tchil) was being produced in the Alexandropol district of the Erivan Governorate from skimmed milk. (Note: The Alexandropol district of the Erivan Governorate corresponds to the modern-day Shirak Province in Armenia) Milk was left to sour in shallow wooden vats, the cream separated, and a starter culture added. The resulting curd was salted, kneaded in salted water, and formed into large circles or bundles of thin strands, known as chetchil or chechil.

The original chechil was made through direct acidification, without rennet. In the former Soviet countries, chechil production increased with the advent of automated production lines in the late 20th and early 21st centuries, with major producers including the Giaginskiy and Ruzaevsky dairy factories in Russia.

In Western countries, chechil is often referred to as Armenian cheese or Syrian cheese. Armenian refugees who settled in Syria after the 1915 Armenian genocide introduced the cheese there.

== Production technology ==
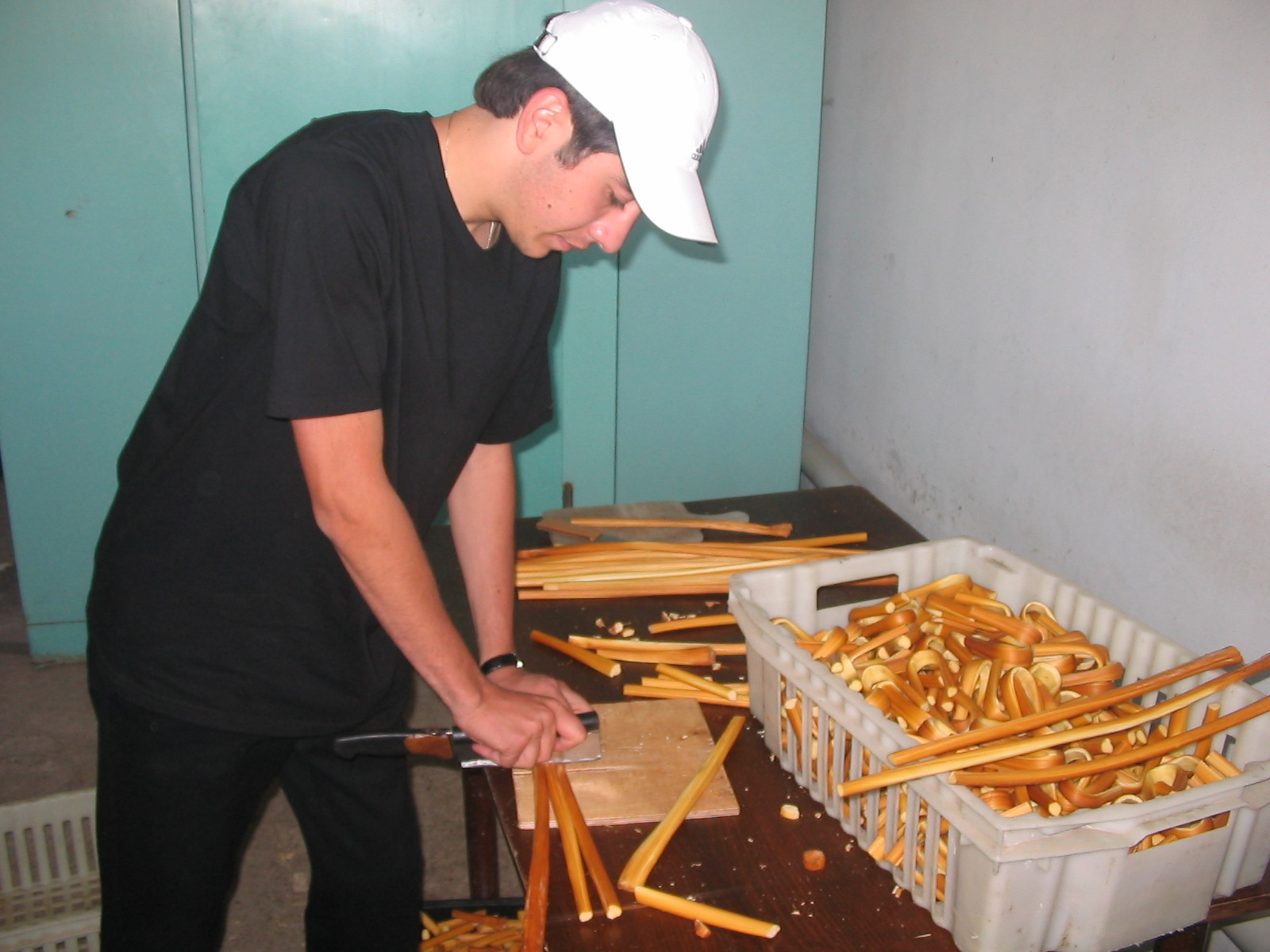
Cutting smoked chechil cheese in Armenia

The cheese is made from skimmed milk with high acidity. To achieve the desired acidity, the milk is left to sour at a temperature of 35–40 °C, or acidic whey, sour milk, or matzoon (a fermented milk product) is added. Rennet or pepsin is added when the acidity of the milk reaches 45–50 °T for cow's milk and 100–110 °T for sheep's milk. The coagulation temperature is 38–40 °C, and the process lasts 5–10 minutes.

After the curd forms, it is heated to 48–54 °C with continuous stirring. The curd turns into flakes, which stick together and form a long ribbon. The cheese mass is gathered, kneaded, stretched, and tied into skeins. The fresh mass is aged in brine with a concentration of 16–19%; sometimes it is mixed with curd or other cheeses and stored in unglazed jugs or in a sheep's skin.

== Regional variants ==
=== Armenia ===
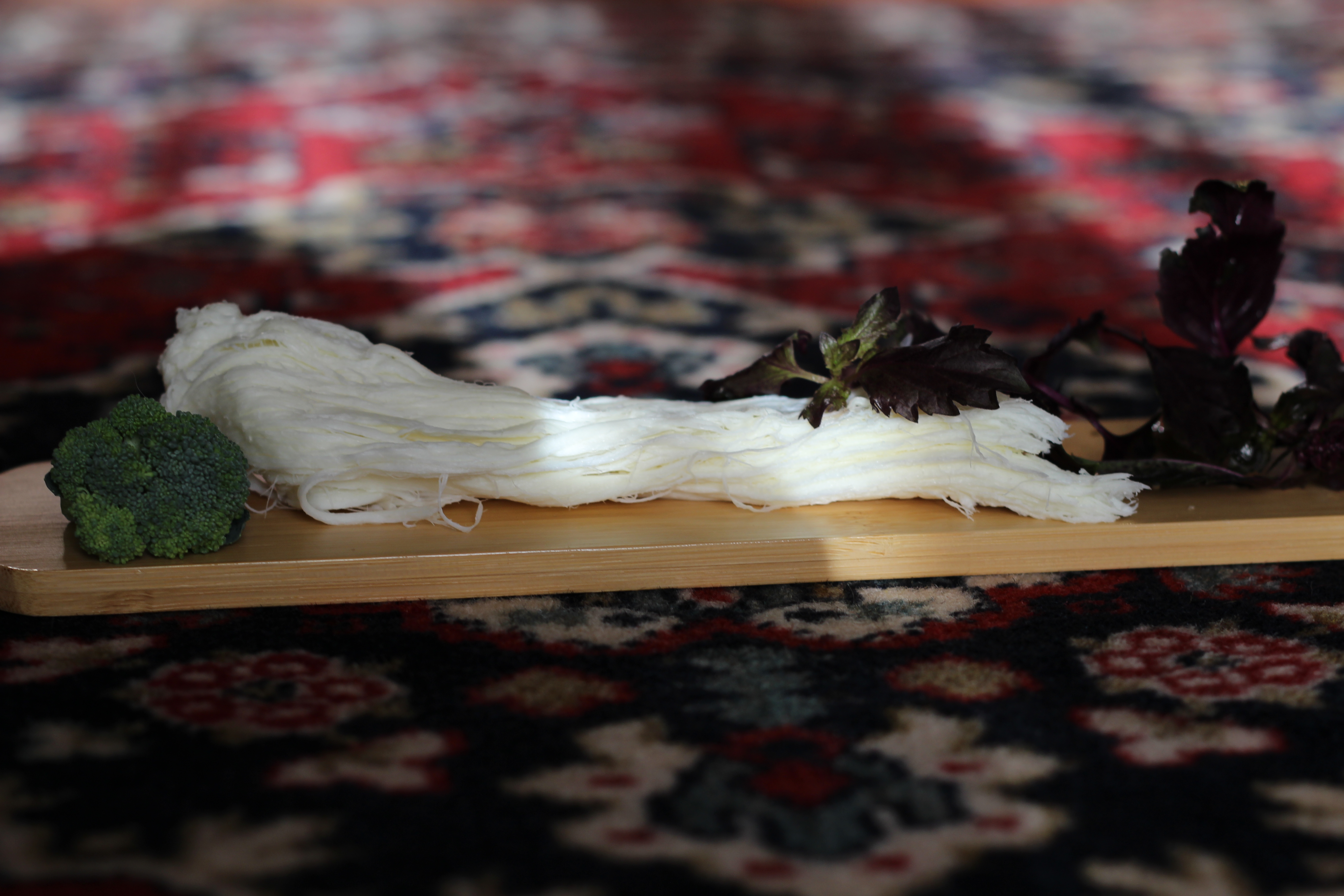
Armenian chechil

In Armenia, chechil is most common in the Shirak region. Armenian varieties include husats and tel panir, which are made by repeatedly stretching heated cheese curds into thin strands and twisting them into ropes. Traditionally, these cheeses were stored in brine in clay pots, and later in enamel or glass containers. Gyumri chechil with blue mold is another regional variant.

Chechil is used as a main ingredient in the traditional dish panrkhash.

The tradition of making chechil and braided cheeses in the Shirak region is included in the intangible cultural heritage list of Armenia.

=== Georgia ===
In Georgia, there are varieties such as Meskhuri chechili and Acharuli chechili. In the United Kingdom, Meskhuri chechili is a protected geographical indication by agreement between the UK and Georgian governments."

=== Turkey ===
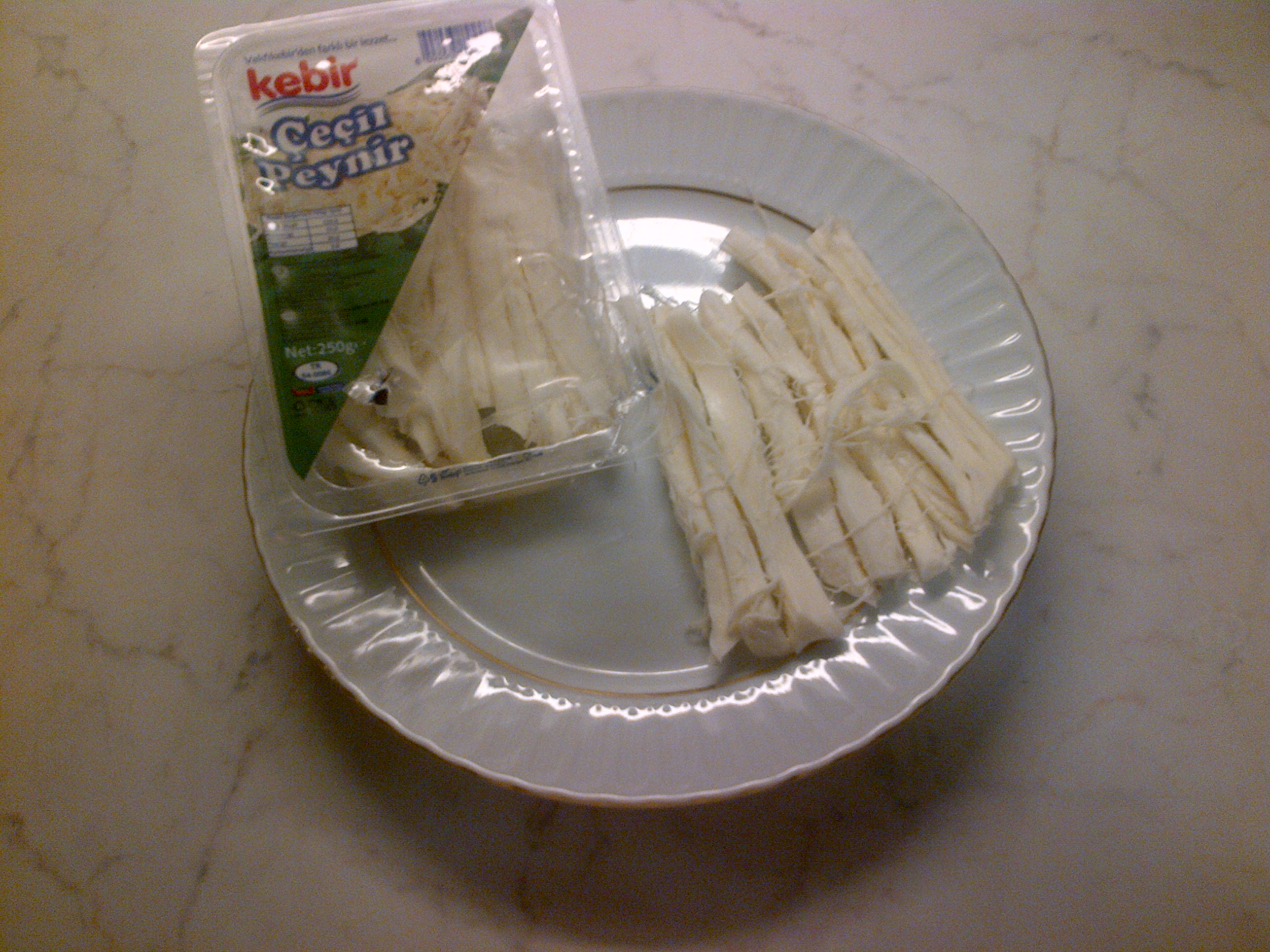
Turkish çeçil

In Turkey, civil peyniri is a similar or identical brined string cheese.

Another form of civil peyniri is produced in the city of Erzurum, and uses Penicillium roqueforti to produce a blue cheese variety of chechil. In 2009, Erzurum civil peyniri was officially registered with the Turkish Patent and Trademark Office and granted a geographical indication.

== Chemical composition ==
- Fat in dry matter — up to 10%
- Moisture — no more than 60%
- Table salt — 4–8%

The cheeses are twisted into coils weighing 3–4 kg. Before consumption, due to their high salt content and firm texture, chechil is soaked in warm or cold water.

== Microbiology ==
Research by M. A. Volkova and Z. K. Dilanyan shows that the microflora of chechil cheese reaches its peak within the first day. The main microorganisms are Lactococcus lactis (47%) and Lactobacillus casei (53%). The development of lactic acid bacteria occurs faster than in other cheeses, and their dominance persists until the end of ripening. One gram of chechil contains approximately 580,000 lactic acid bacteria according to the MPA method and about 5 million according to the maximum dilution method.

== Gallery ==
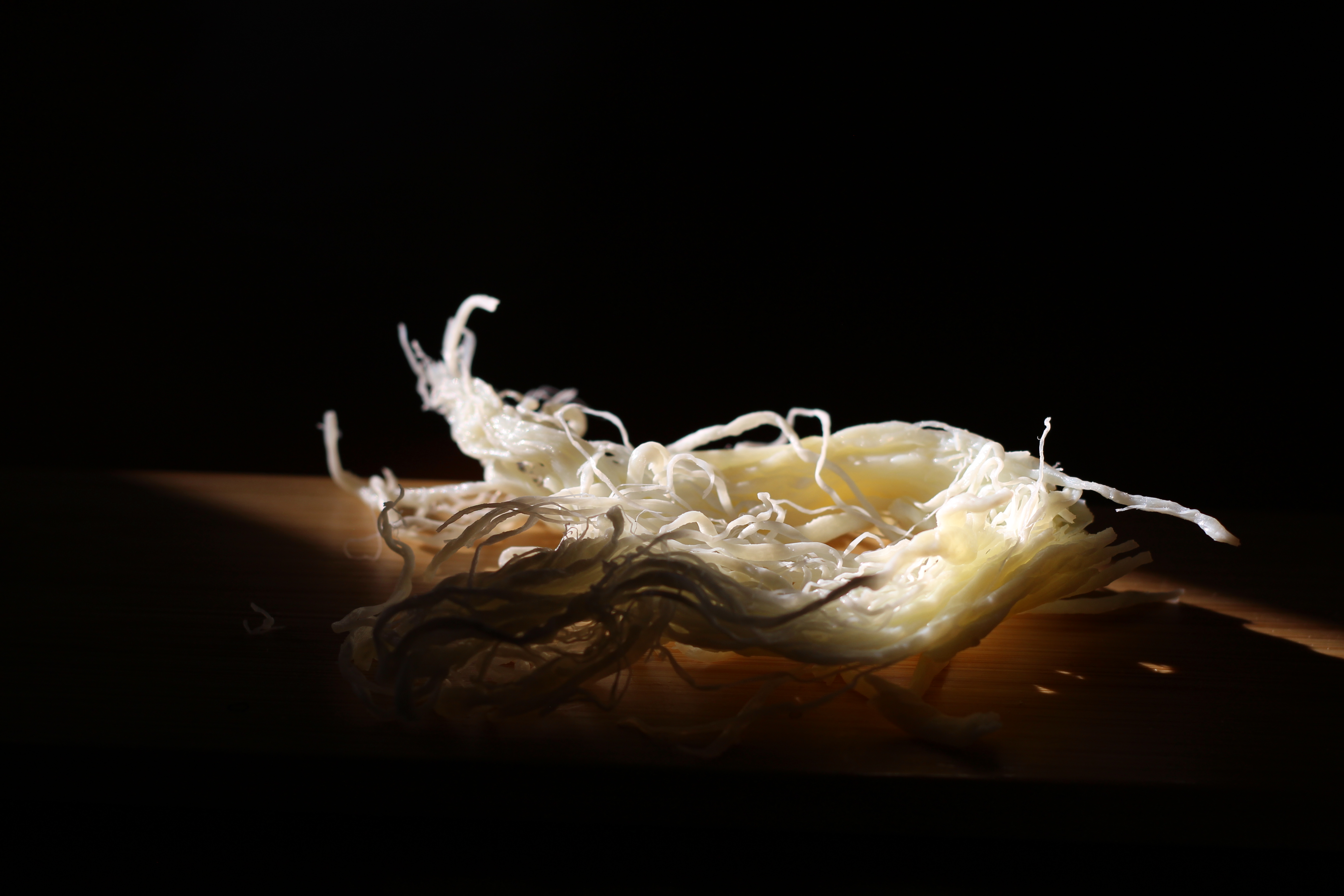
Armenian tel panir (husats panir)

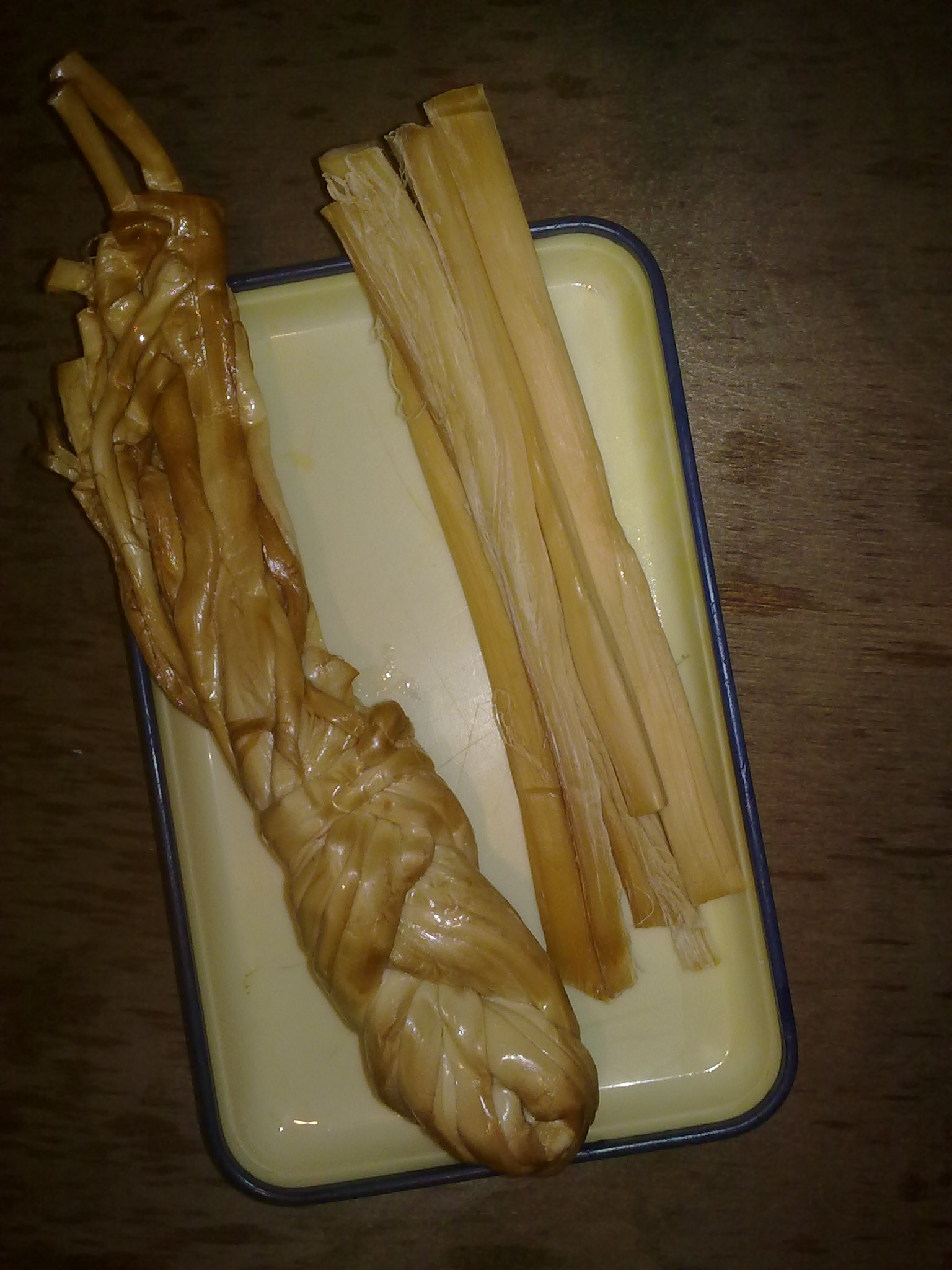
Kurdish çîçal

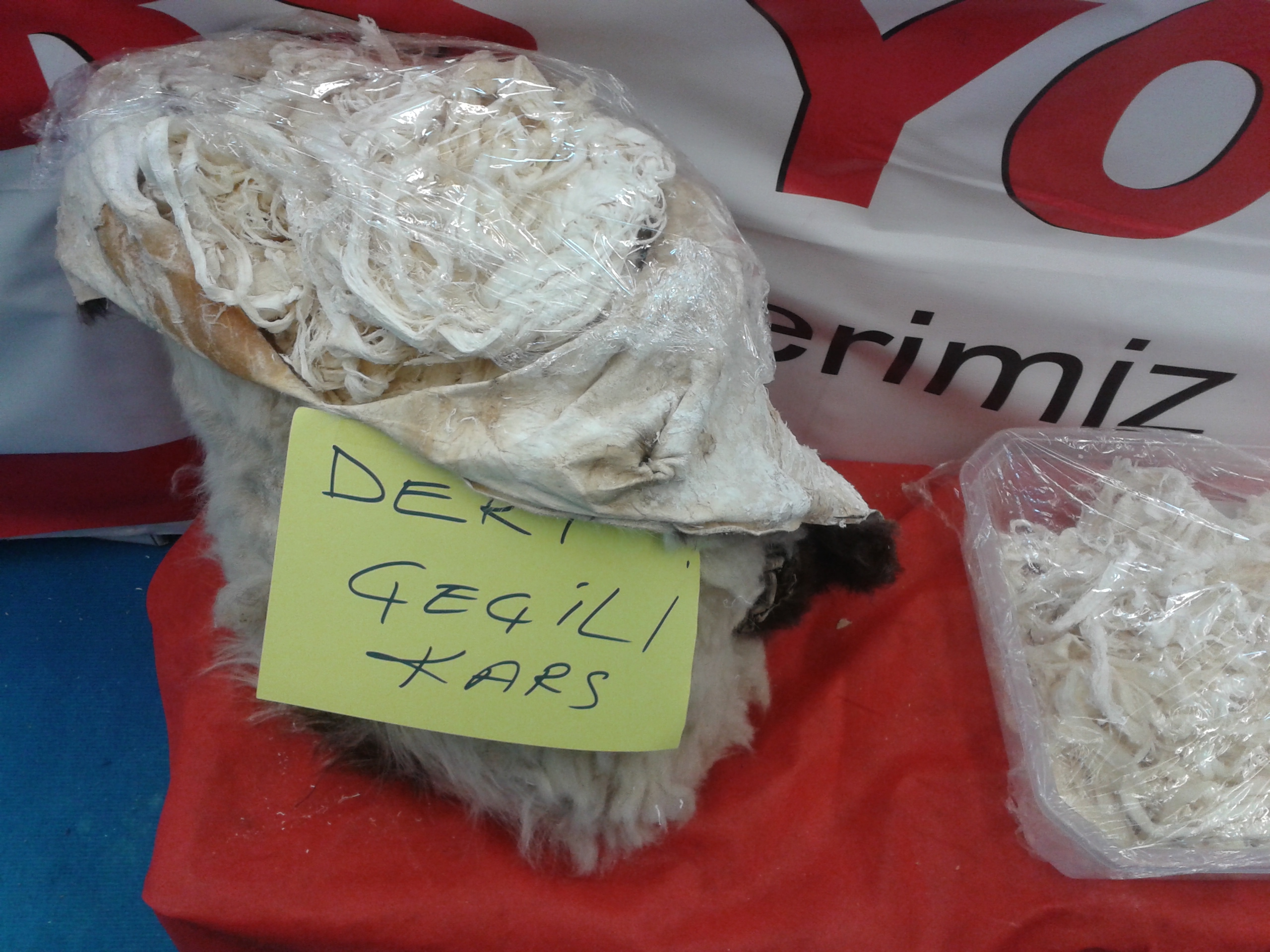
Turkish çeçil in Kars

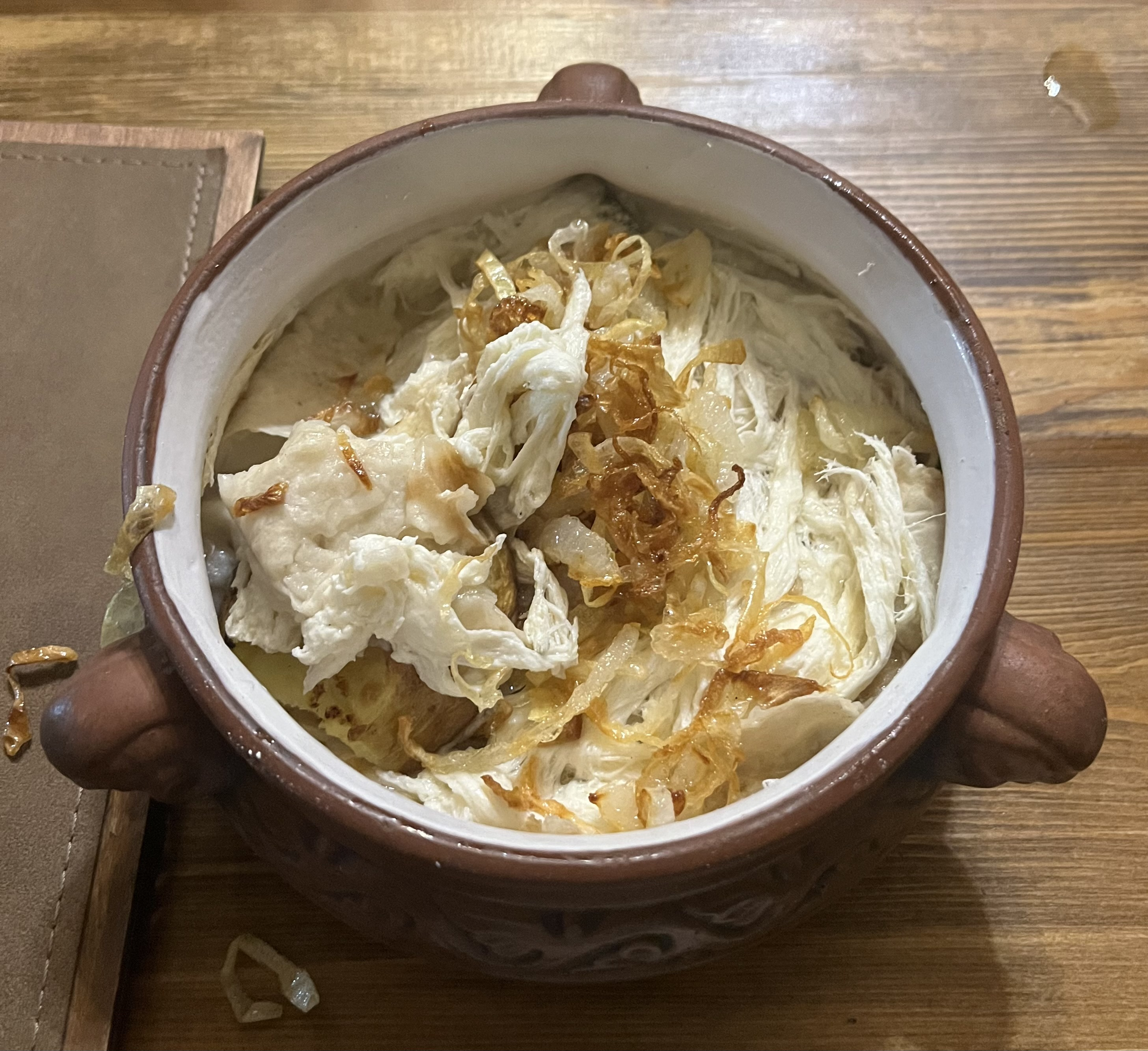
Chechil in the dish Panrkhash

== See also ==
- List of cheeses
- List of stretch-curd cheeses
- String cheese
