= Korbáčik =

Slovak cheese

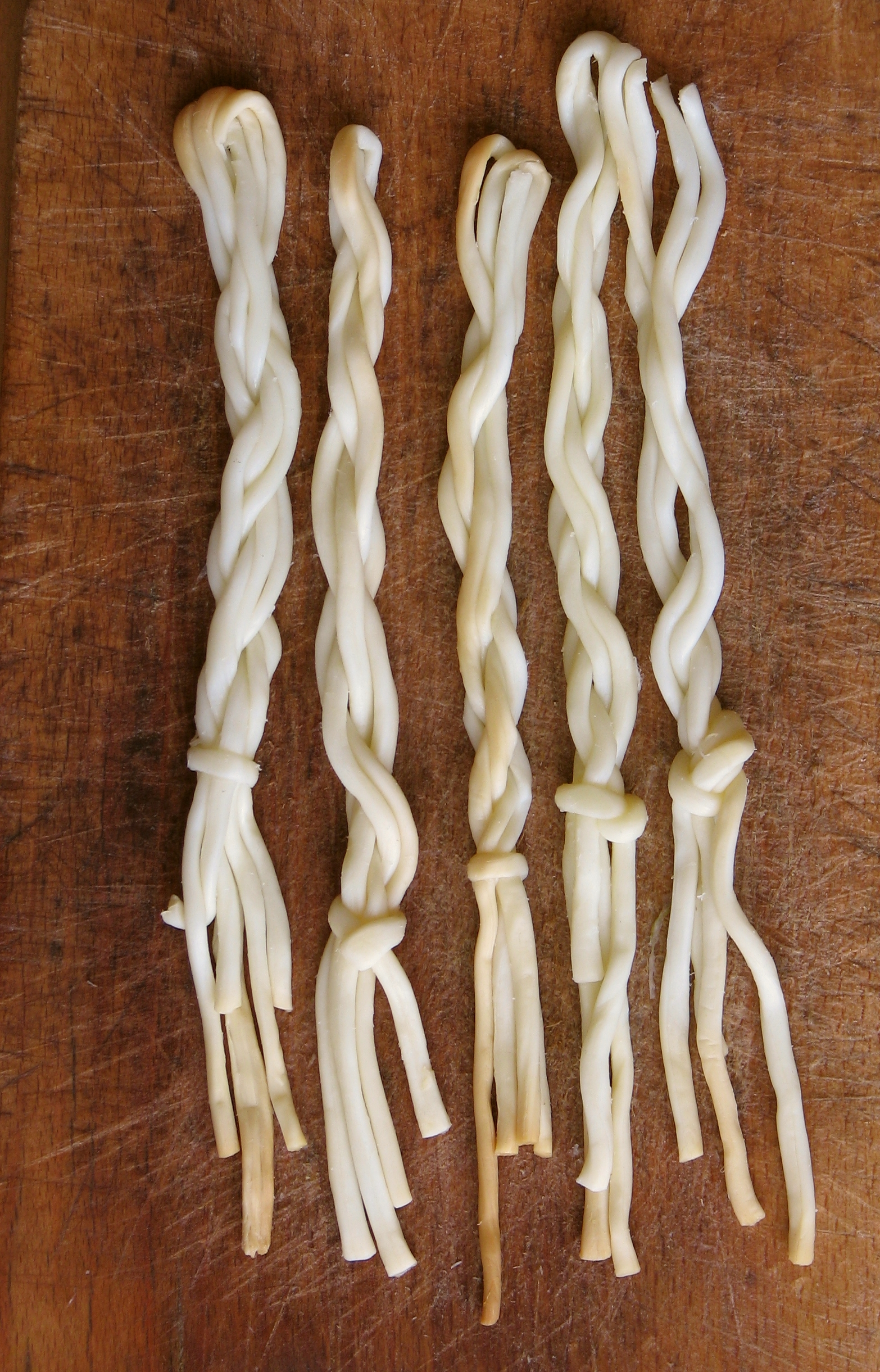
- Other names: Korbacz, korboc
- Country of origin: Slovakia, Poland
- Region: Orava, Podhale
- Source of milk: Primarily cows and sheep
- Pasteurised: Yes
- Texture: Medium-hard
- Aging time: 4 weeks – 10 months
- Certification: Yes, Slovakia owns the patent

Korbáčik (Slovak: [ˈkɔrbaːtʂik]; Polish: korbacz [ˈkɔrbat͡ʂ], Goral dialect: korboc [ˈkuɔ̯rbɔc]; (Note: Plural: Slovak: korbáčiky [ˈkɔrbaːtʂiki]; Polish: korbacze [kɔrˈbat͡ʂɛ], Goral dialect: korboce [kuɔ̯rˈbɔce].) lit. 'little whip', after the pattern woven onto the strings) is a type of semi-hard or medium hard string cheese. It originates from the Orava region of northern Slovakia and South Poland as well as many other Goralic Regions. It is made from (usually smoked) cheese interwoven into fine braids.

There are two main variants of the korbáčik: smoked and unsmoked. In addition to these, it is not uncommon to produce salty variants, as well as with garlic. The basis for the production is milk, either from cow or from sheep.

== See also ==
- List of smoked foods
- List of stretch-curd cheeses
