= Parenica =

Slovak traditional cheese

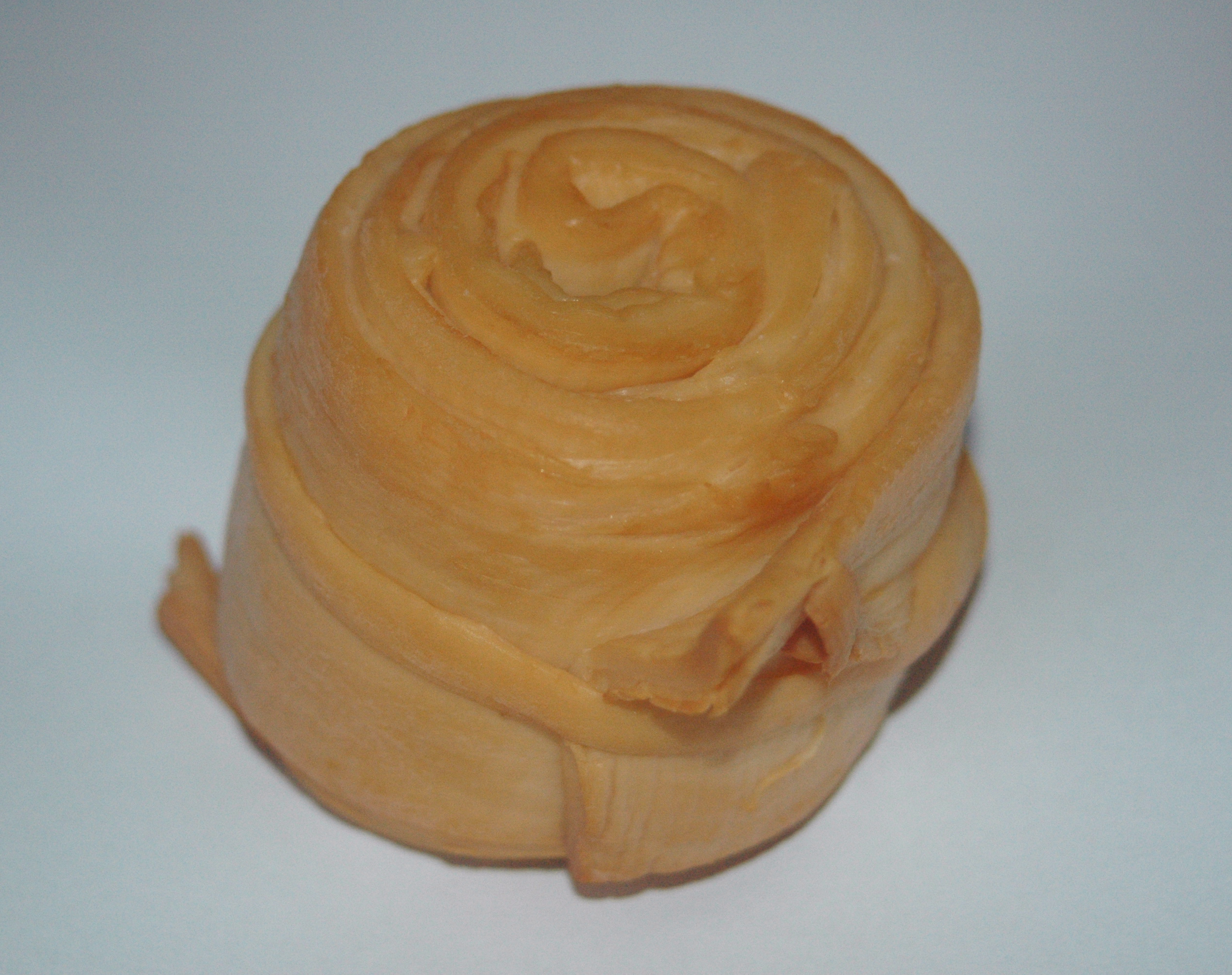
Smoked Parenica

Parenica is a traditional Slovak cheese. Parenica is a semi-firm, non-ripening, semi-fat, steamed and usually smoked cheese, although a non-smoked version is also produced. Parenica is cream and yellow in color, which is darkened by steaming. The cheese is produced in strips, which are woven into snail-like spirals. Originally, in the 1800s, it was made from pure non-pasteurized sheep's milk. Modern varieties are also produced from cow's milk or milk mixtures. Typical cheese rolls weigh about 100 grams (0.1 kg / 0.2 pound / 3 oz).

The name comes from the Slovak word for steaming. Slovenská parenica is a protected trade name under the EU's protected geographical indication.

== See also ==
- List of smoked foods
- List of cheeses
- List of stretch-cured cheeses
