= Moliterno (cheese) =

Italian pasta filata cheese

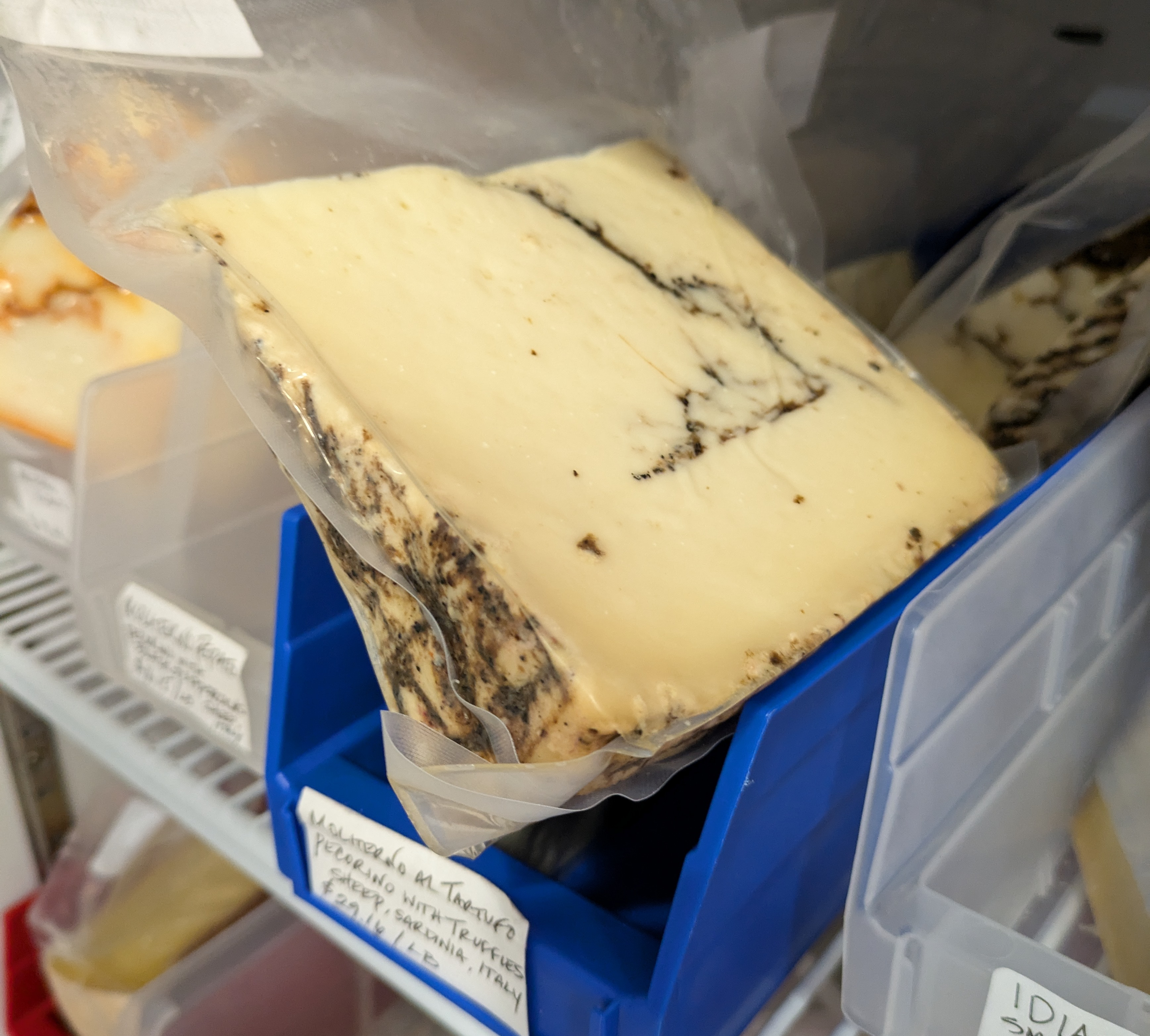
Moliterno al tartufo

Moliterno (Lucano: Mulitiernu) is an Italian pasta filata cheese that is produced in a similar manner to caciocavallo and other pasta filata cheeses.

When the cheese is prepared using only sheep milk, it is prepared in a different manner, and is referred to as pecorino moliterno or pecorino di moliterno, the latter referring to the cheese made in the town of Moliterno in the southern Italian region of Basilicata. Pecorino moliterno is produced as a hard cheese, and during the curing process olive oil is rubbed into its surface, which produces a rind to prevent the loss of moisture. When the cheese is first drained into baskets before aging, it takes on the shape of the ridges in the baskets, and some people refer to the cheese as pecorino incanestrato, from the Italian word "canestra" for basket.

== History ==
Moliterno was first produced in the Calabria and Lucania regions of Southern Italy. Today, it is produced in the Basilicata region of Southern Italy.

== See also ==
- Italian cuisine
- List of stretch-curd cheeses
- List of cheeses
