= String cheese =

Elongated type of cheese

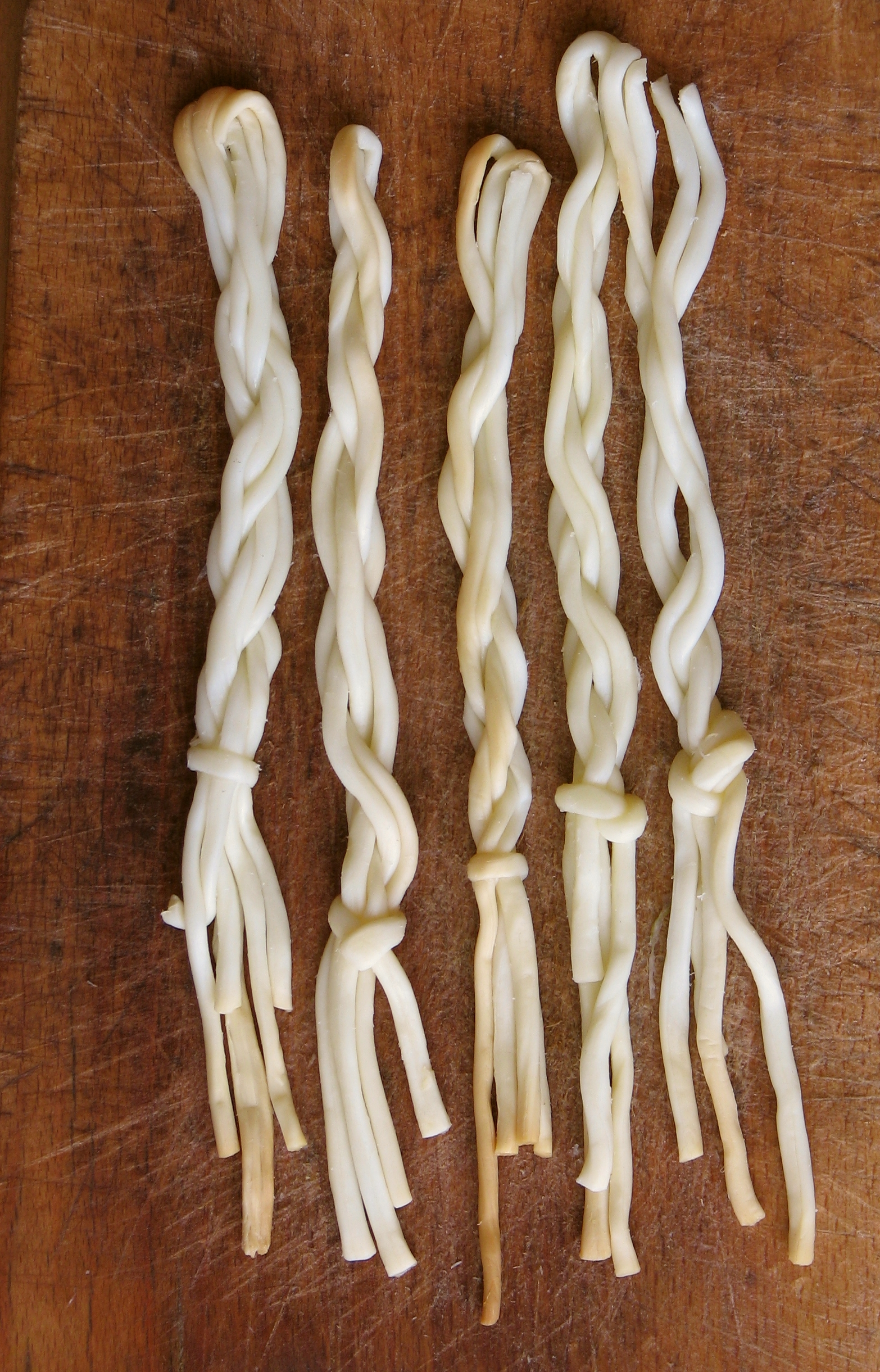
- Traditional Korbáčiky from Slovakia

String cheese is any of several different types of cheese where the manufacturing process aligns the proteins in the cheese, making it stringy.

When mozzarella is heated to 60 °C (140 °F) and then stretched, the milk proteins line up. It is then possible to peel strings or strips from the larger cheese.

== Regional variants ==
=== United Kingdom and Western Europe ===
In the United Kingdom and Ireland, a popular brand of string cheese is Cheestrings, manufactured by Kerry Dairy Ireland starting in 1996. The cheese is manufactured using grass-fed cows' milk which is matured. The cheese is heated, stretched and then cut to size for retailing. From 2004 to 2016, Kerry expanded their operations to continental Europe and currently export to France, Germany, Poland, Portugal, the Netherlands, Belgium, Austria, Spain and Italy.

Cheestrings first appeared in the UK during the 90s and originally included cheddar, smoky bacon and pizza flavour. A later variant was the two-color Twister made from cheddar and mozzarella. The brand's mascot is a cartoon character called Mr. Strings.

=== Central and Eastern Europe ===
In Slovakia, korbáčiky are made, which is a salty sheep's milk cheese, available smoked or unsmoked. It is traditionally made by hand-pulling steamed sheep's cheese into strings and braiding them. Cow milk versions are also available. The town of Zázrivá is known as the center of the production of this cheese. Similar cheeses are found also in the adjacent regions of South Poland and the Czech Republic.

=== West Asia ===
In Turkey, the most common type of string cheese is dil peyniri ("tongue cheese"), a fresh white cheese made from cow's milk, traditionally in the provinces of Bilecik and Bursa. The stringy texture of dil becomes even more prominent when the cheese is melted.

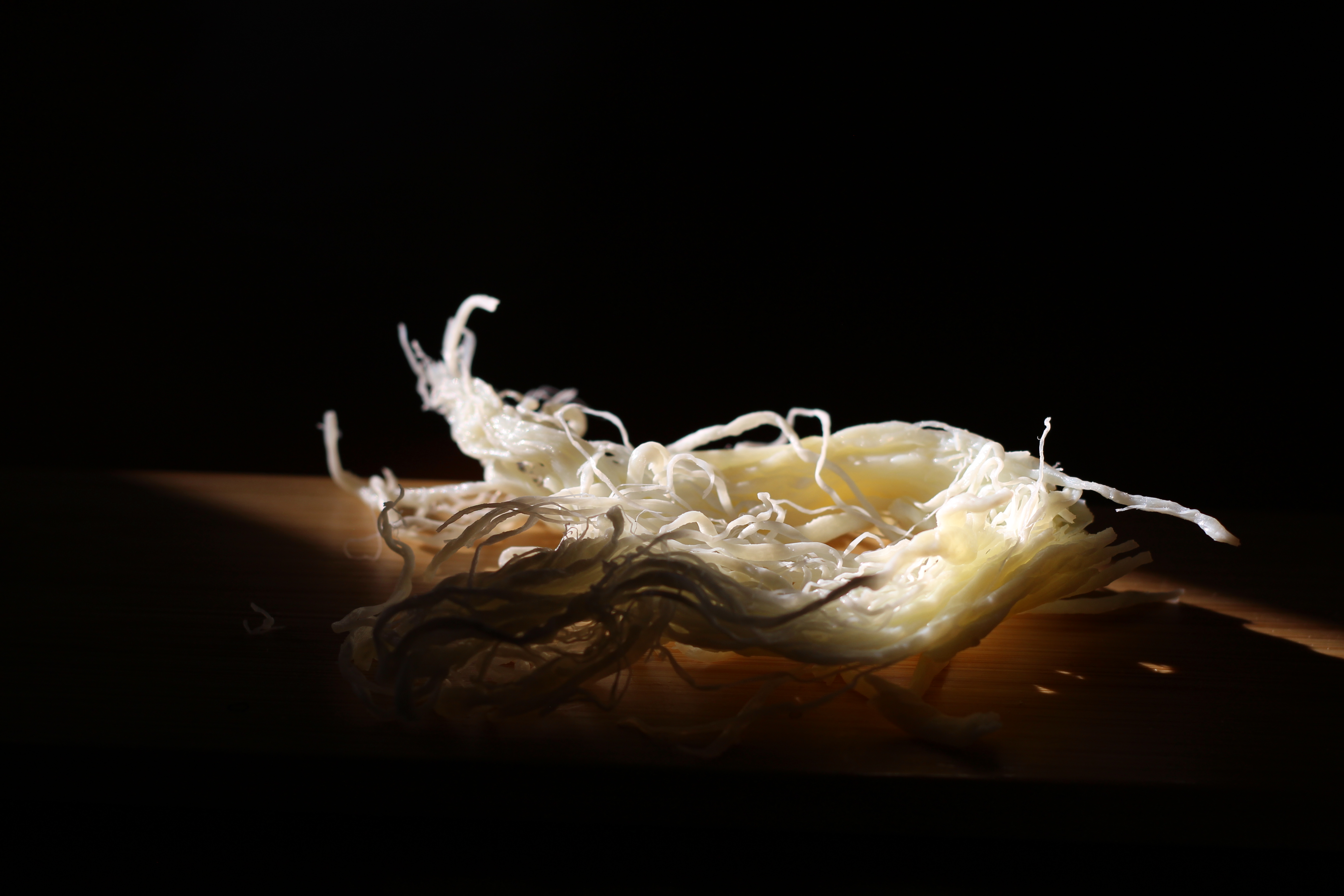
Armenian traditional tel panir

In Armenia, traditional string cheese, chechil, is made with a white base. The type of milk used usually comes from an aged goat or sheep depending upon the production methods of the area of choice. It is seasoned with black cumin and mahleb, and is traditionally sold in the form of a braided endless loop. The cheese forms into strings due to how it is pulled during processing. It is also made in Syria and Turkey, both countries with significant Armenian populations.

In Syria, string cheese is known as jibneh mshalleheh. It contains spices such as mahleb, cumin, anise, and caraway.

Russia is the primary importer of chechil, having an 80% market share for Armenian cheese exports, attributed to its sizeable Armenian diasporas.

In Georgia string cheese is known as tenili (ტენილი ყველი, Тенили). It is made from fermented sheep's milk and cream allowed to mature for 60 days in a salted and dried veal stomach.

=== Mexico ===
In Mexico, the first type of string cheese was invented in 1885 by Leobarda Castellanos García at 14 years old. A very popular type of string cheese called quesillo is sold today in balls of various sizes. It is also known as Oaxaca cheese or "queso Oaxaca", referring to the place where it was invented, and now it's widely popular in all Mexican territories.

=== United States ===
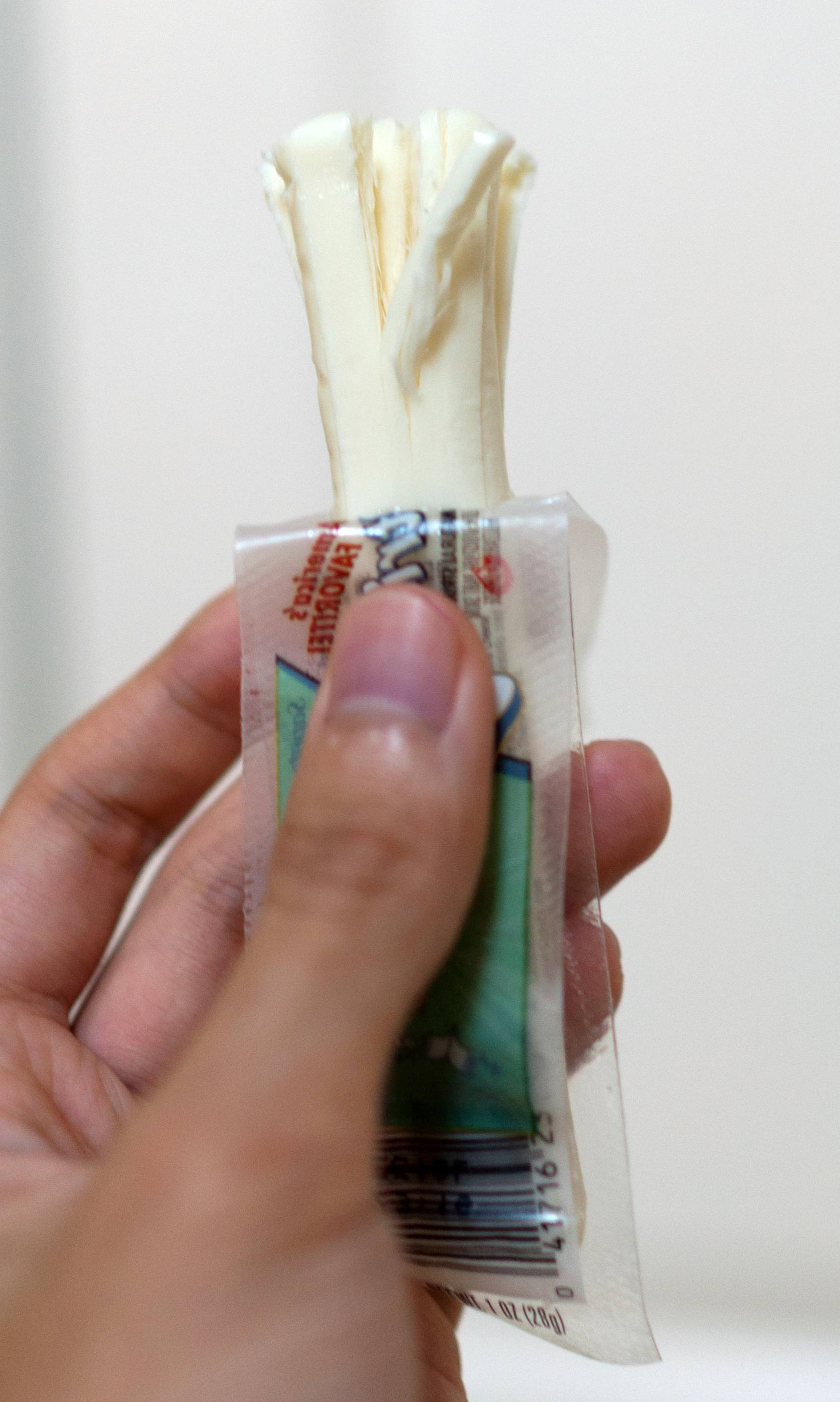
American string cheese

In the United States, string cheese generally refers to snack-sized servings of low-moisture mozzarella. This form of string cheese is roughly cylindrical, about 6 inches (15 cm) long and less than 1 inch (2.5 cm) in diameter.

The cheese used is commonly a form of mozzarella, or a combination of mozzarella and cheddar. This type of string cheese gets its name because it can be eaten by pulling strips of cheese from the cylinder along its length and eating these strings. It was invented in 1976 by Frank Baker.

=== Central America and Caribbean ===
In the Dominican Republic "Queso de Hoja" is produced in the form of a ball. It is mostly served with toast or crackers.

Costa Rica's most famous variant originates on Zarcero and it's called "Queso palmito" wich is produced in a "knotted ball" form, this makes it easier to peel the strings and has made it one of the most popular ways to eat string cheese.

=== Oceania ===
In Australia, string cheese is sold by the Bega Group and is called Bega Stringers.

== See also ==
- Armenian cuisine
- List of cheeses
- List of stretch-curd cheeses
- Pasta filata
