= Moliterno =

Moliterno Mulitiernu
- Comune
- Comune di Moliterno
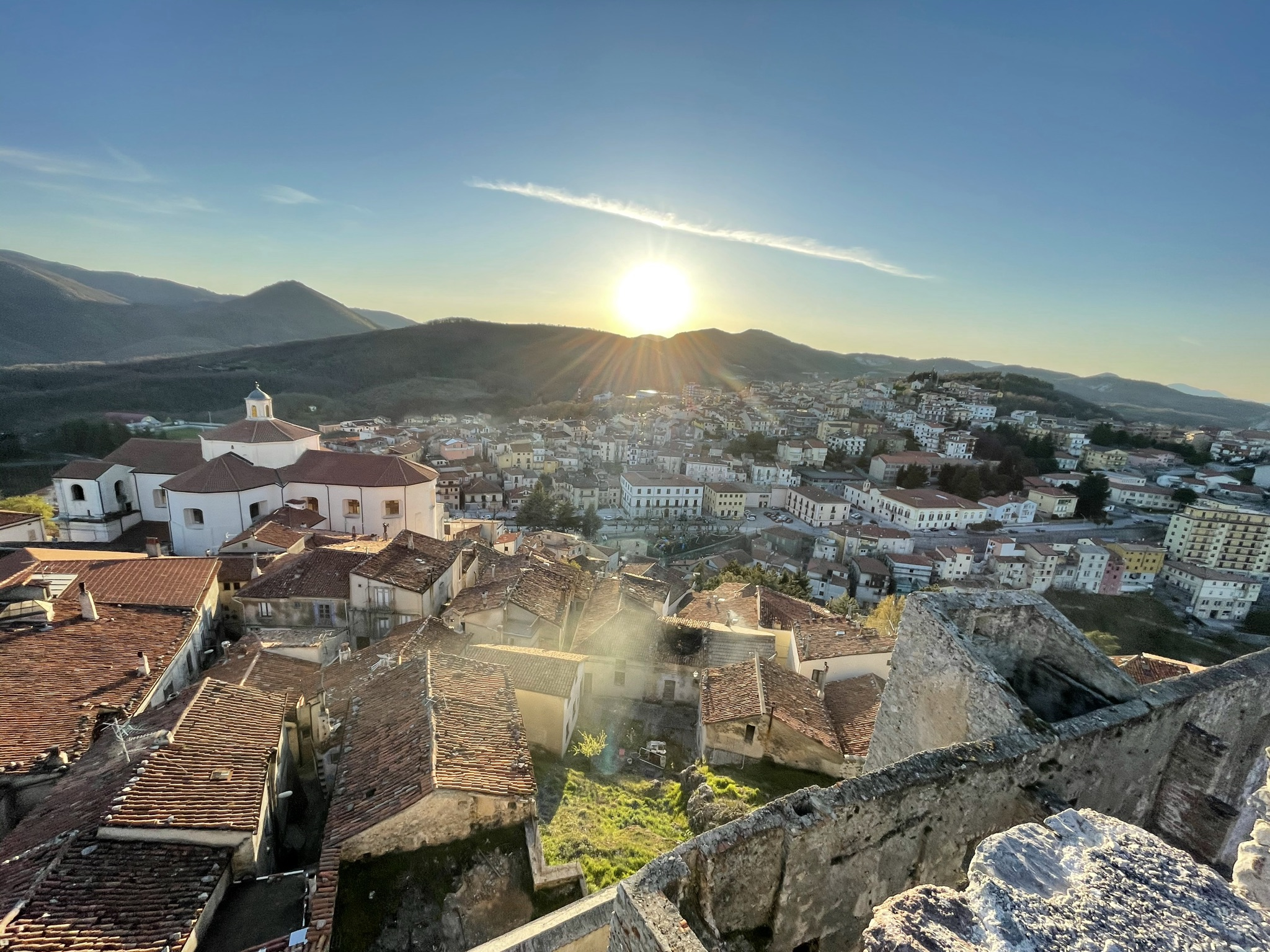
- View of Moliterno

- Coat of arms

- Location of Moliterno in Italy Moliterno (Basilicata)
- Coordinates: 40°14′32.1″N 15°52′2.5″E
- Country: Italy
- Region: Basilicata
- Province: Potenza (PZ)
- Frazioni: Fontana D'Eboli, Piano Di Maglie, Rimintiello, Tempa Del Conte

Government
  - Mayor: Giuseppe Tancredi

Area
  - Total: 97.63 km^{2} (37.70 sq mi)
- Elevation: 879 m (2,884 ft)

Population (31 December 2009)
  - Total: 4,345
  - Density: 44.50/km^{2} (115.3/sq mi)
- Demonym: Moliternesi
- Time zone: UTC+1 (CET)
  - Summer (DST): UTC+2 (CEST)
- Postal code: 85047
- Dialing code: 0975
- ISTAT code: 076050
- Patron saint: St Dominic
- Saint day: August 4
- Website: Official website

Moliterno (Lucano: Mulitiernu) is a town and comune in the province of Potenza, in the southern Italian region of Basilicata. It is bounded by the comuni of Castelsaraceno, Grumento Nova, Lagonegro, Lauria, Montesano sulla Marcellana, Sarconi, Tramutola.

== History ==
Tradition states that Moliterno was built after the destruction of Grumentum by the Saracens, which occurred between 872 and 975. Several Grumentini, who had escaped the massacre, settled around a tower built by the Lombards. Moliterno was later a possession of the Normans.

== Main sights ==
=== Churches ===
- Chiesa Madre, inside it houses the painting of The Deposition, attributed to the 17th-century painter Pietrafesa.
- Chiesa del Rosario
- Chiesa della Trinità
- Chiesa Santa Croce

=== Chapels ===
- Madonna del Carmine
- Chiesa Santa Barbara
- Cappella di San Pietro
- Chiesa di San Rocco
- Cappella dell' Angelo

== See also ==
- Moliterno (cheese)
