= Modicana =

Breed of cattle

- Country of origin: Italy: Sicily: province of Ragusa
- Use: Dual-purpose: milk and beef

Traits
- Coat: Wheaten; red; dark red; almost black
- Horn status: Horned

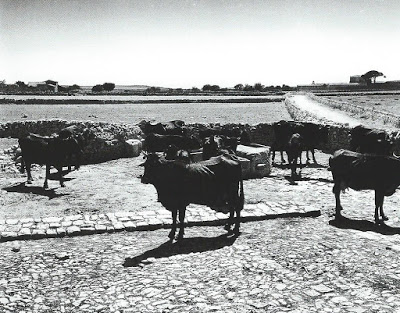

The Modicana is a cattle breed from the province of Ragusa in the Italian island of Sicily. It is one of the 16 minor Italian cattle breeds "of limited diffusion" recognised and protected by the Ministero delle Politiche Agricole Alimentari e Forestali, the Italian ministry of agriculture.
