= Queso =

Queso (Spanish for "cheese") may refer to:

- Chile con queso, a cheesy sauce
- Queso Records
- Queso blanco, a white cheese
- Queso Chihuahua
- Queso flameado
- an obsolete TCP/IP stack fingerprinting tool that was well known in the late 1990s
- Queso, a character from The Lingo Show, a kids' TV show
- "Queso", a 2015 song by Lil Uzi Vert from the album Luv Is Rage
