= Añejo cheese =

Type of Mexican cheese

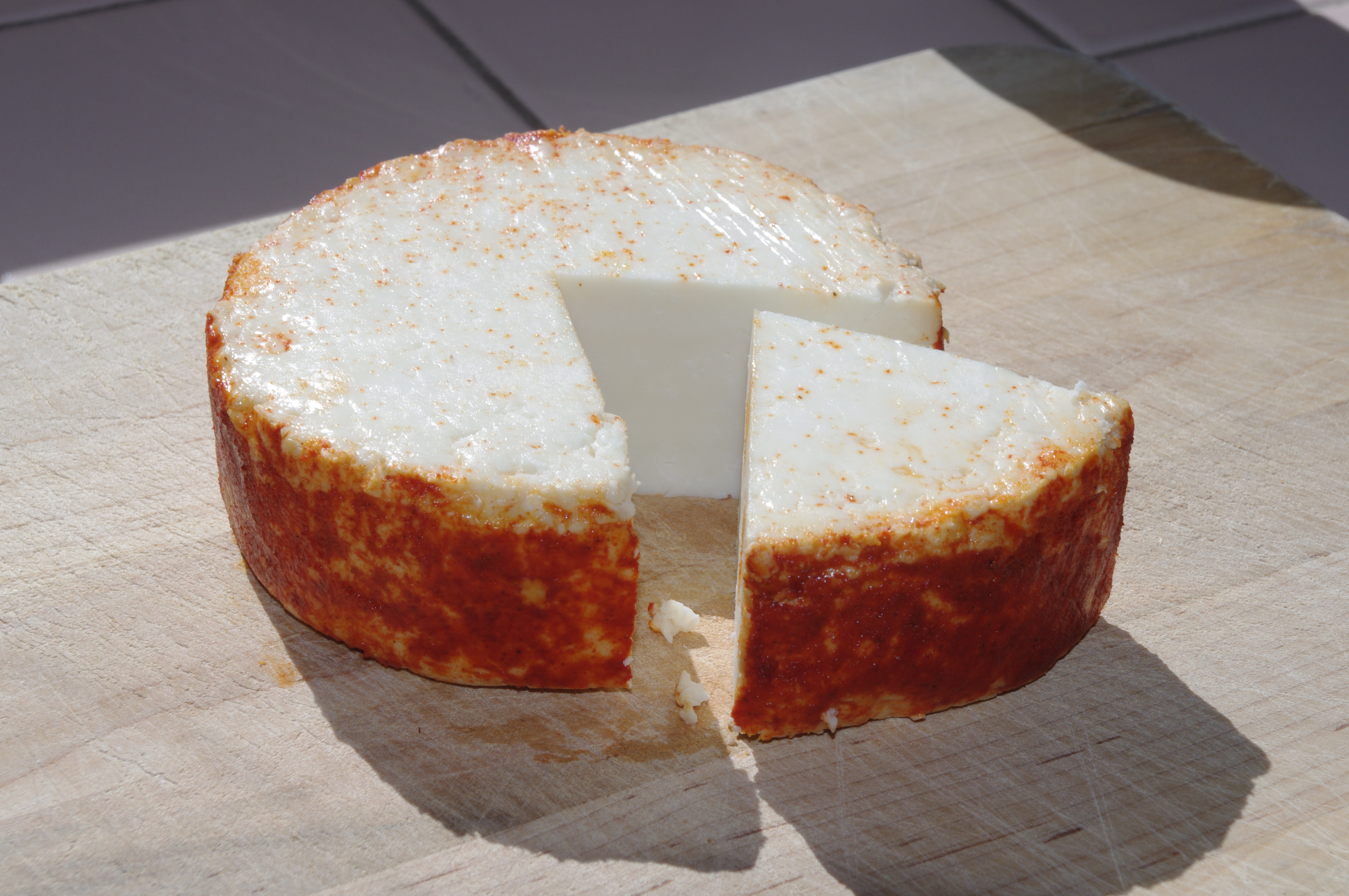
Añejo cheese (Queso añejo)

Añejo cheese (Spanish: queso añejo [ˈkeso aˈɲexo]) is a firm, aged Mexican cheese traditionally made from skimmed goat's milk, but most often available made from skimmed cow's milk. After it is made, it is rolled in paprika to add additional flavor to its salty, sharp flavor, which is somewhat similar to Parmesan cheese or Romano cheese, but not as strongly flavored as cotija cheese. As a fresh cheese, it is crumbly and breaks into small pieces very easily. When dried, it acquires a firm texture, allowing it to be easily shredded or grated. Queso añejo is a good baking or grilling cheese, which is generally sprinkled on top of or stuffed into enchiladas, burritos, tostadas, and tacos. Parmesan, Cotija, or feta cheese can be substituted when añejo is not available. It may also be referred to as añejo enchilado cheese or añejo (meaning "aged"). Queso añejo has been made in Zacatecas since at least the early nineteenth century.

== See also ==
- List of goat milk cheeses
