= Licon =

Licon is a surname. Notable people with the surname include:

- Jeffrey Licon (born 1985), American actor
- Will Licon (born 1994), American competition swimmer

== See also ==
- Licona
- Licon Dairy
