= Cheeses of Mexico =

Overview of Mexican cheeses

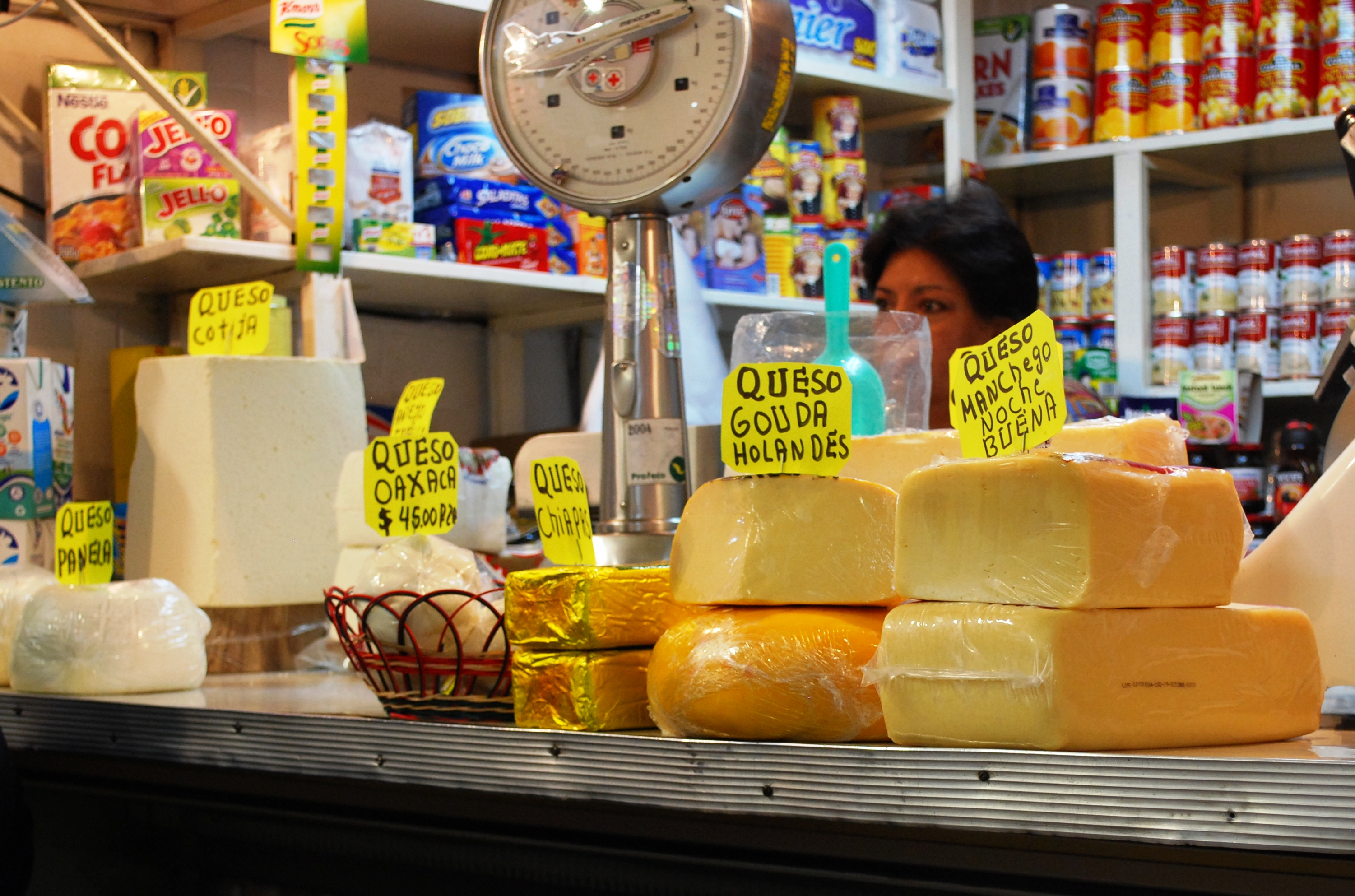
Counter with various cheeses for sale at the Coyoacan market in Coyoacán, Mexico City

Cheeses in Mexico have a history that begins with the Spanish conquest, as dairy products were unknown in pre-Columbian Mesoamerica. The Spanish brought dairy animals, such as cattle, sheep, and goats, as well as cheesemaking techniques. Over the colonial period, cheesemaking was modified to suit the mixed European and indigenous tastes of the inhabitants of New Spain, varying by region. This blending and variations have given rise to a number of varieties of Mexican cheese. Mexican cheese varieties dominate the domestic market. Almost all cheese in Mexico is made with cows' milk, with some made from goats' milk. More recently, efforts have been made to promote sheep's milk cheeses. Most cheeses are made with raw (unpasteurized) milk. Cheeses are made in the home, on small farms or ranches, and by major dairy product firms. Between 20 and 40 different varieties of cheese are made in Mexico, depending on how one classifies them. Some, such as Oaxaca and panela, are made all over Mexico, but many are regional cheeses known only in certain sections on the country. Some of the least common are in danger of extinction.

== History ==
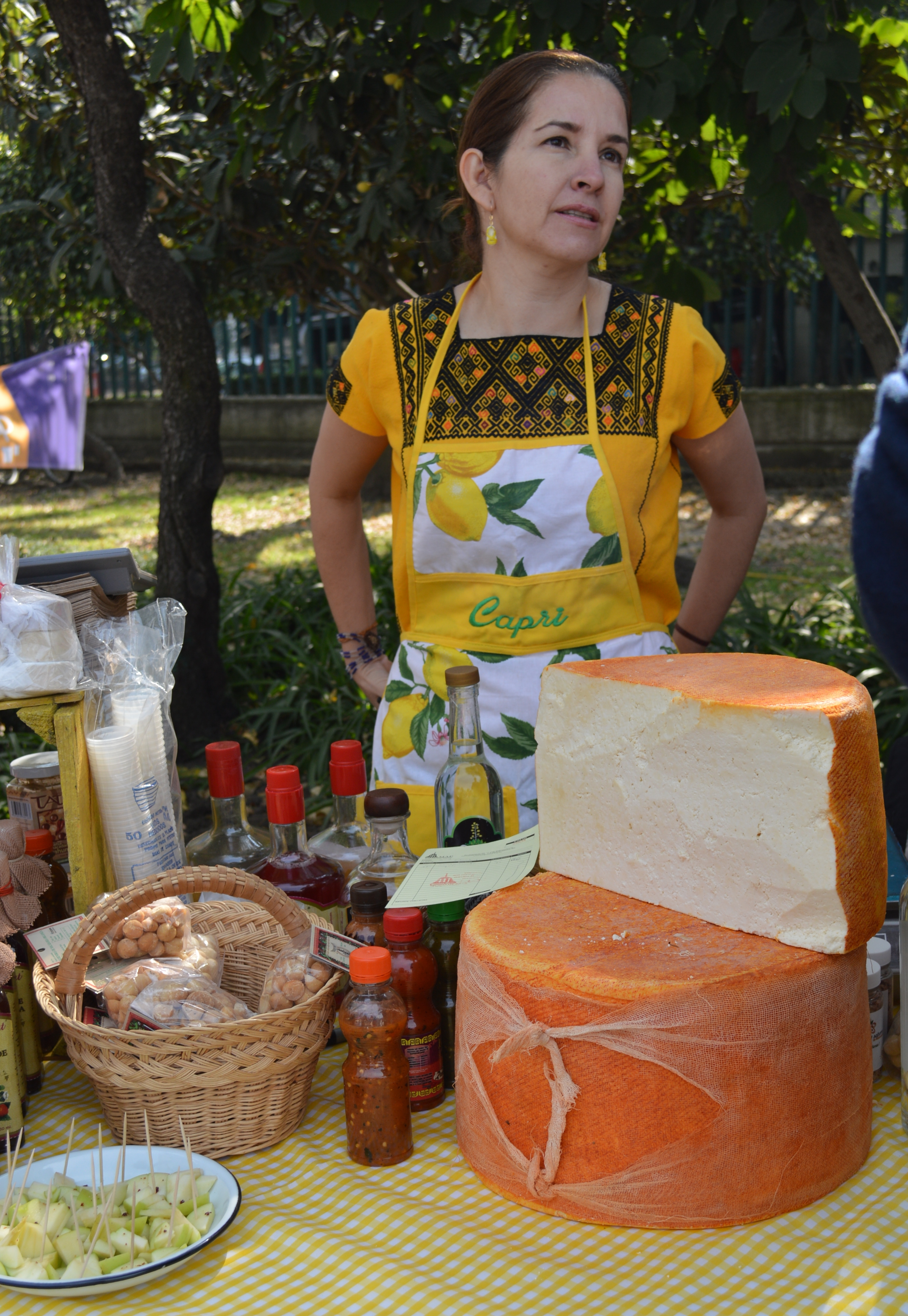
Vendor selling artisanal cheese made from sheep's milk.

Prior to the arrival of the Europeans, the Mesoamerican diet did not include dairy products, so cheesemaking was unknown. The Spanish conquistadors brought cattle, goats, and sheep to the New World, permanently changing dietary habits. The Spanish also brought techniques to make cheeses from their homeland, such as manchego. Over time, the blending of European and indigenous peoples and traditions included the modification of cheeses to suit mestizo tastes. This adaptation varied from region to region, which has led to the variety of cheeses produced in Mexico today.

While cheesemaking has always been a widespread, mostly home-based, activity since colonial times, the earliest regions to become known for their cheese are the Altos de Jalisco and the Comarca Lagunera area in Coahuila and Durango. Both are still major producers of cheese and other dairy products. Today, major cheese-producing areas also include Chihuahua, Oaxaca, Querétaro, Aguascalientes, Jalisco, Guanajuato, San Luis Potosi, Michoacán, Puebla, Tlaxcala, Toluca and Chiapas.

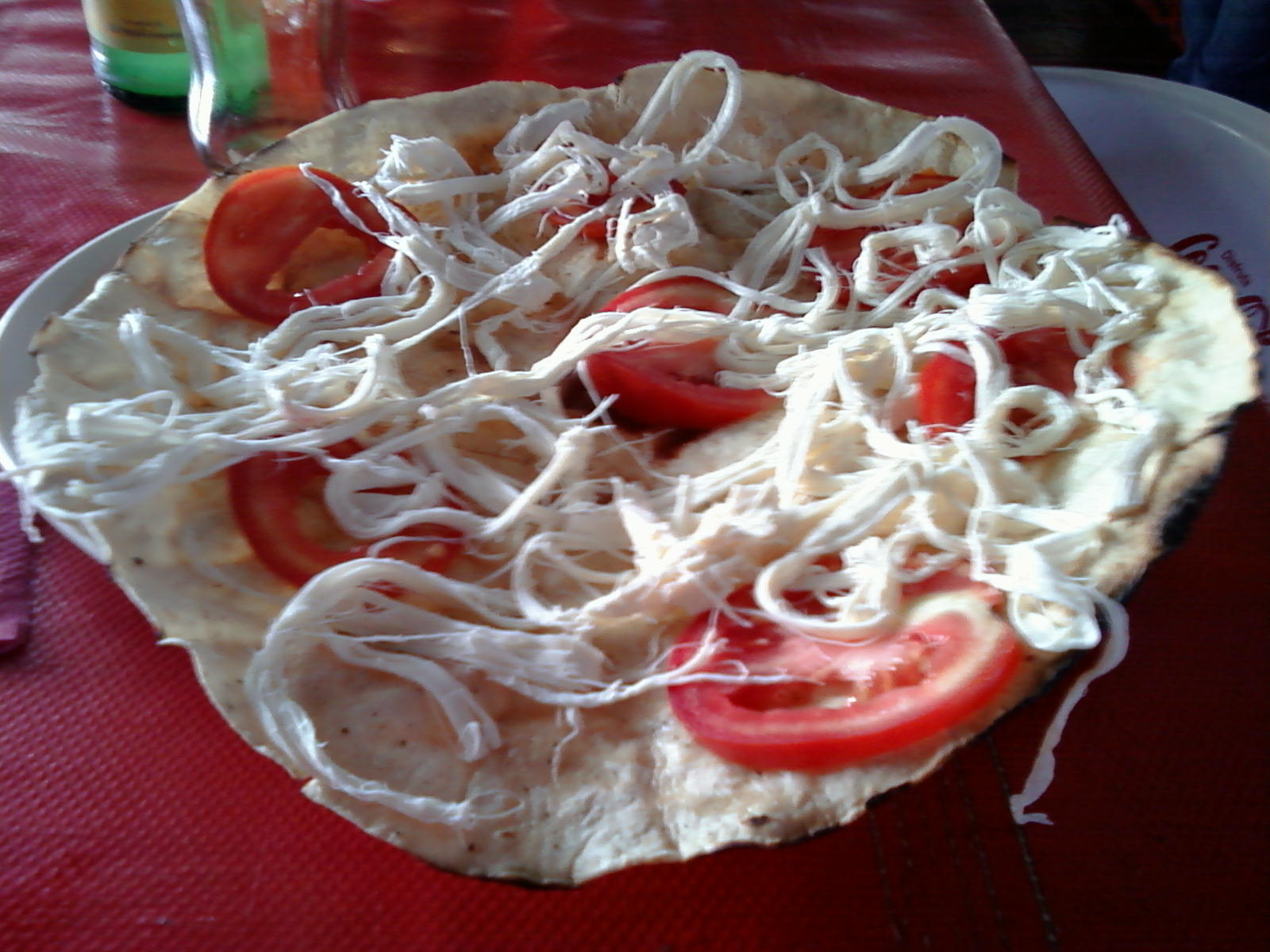
Tlayuda with Oaxaca cheese

Despite centuries of cheesemaking experience, Mexico lags behind Europe in both quantity and variety. Most cheeses made in the country are made by small concerns and farms which sell their products locally.

While some cheeses, such as Chihuahua and panela, have become mass-produced and are made with pasteurized milk, the majority are still made locally with raw milk. Mexican cheeses are not standardized either by type, process or quality.

Mexican and Mexican-style cheeses have become more common on grocery shelves in the United States. Until recently, only the fairly common cheeses were available, mostly in Mexican restaurants, such as Cotija, sprinkled on top of certain dishes, and Oaxaca cheese, melted on tortillas. Now, companies in the US are recreating many of the fresh and aged cheeses from Mexico, with some even attempting the production of lesser-known varieties.

== Production and distribution ==
Mexico is ranked 10th in the world for cheese production and eighth for consumption. Cheese sales in Mexico were 218,000 tons in 2003, with fresh (not aged) cheeses making up over one-third of the market, the largest segment. Only 126,200 tons of the cheese consumed in the country that year were produced domestically, with the rest imported. About 10% of the milk production in the country is dedicated to the making of dairy products, most of which is cheese. The overwhelming majority of cheese is made with cows’ milk. While a number of cheeses are made with goats’ milk, they are not as popular and have gotten more difficult to find in markets. Shepherding, though, historically has never been a major commercial activity nationwide, efforts since the 1980s to promote sheep milk and meat have resulted in a significant rise in the number of sheep being raised. This is promoting the development of sheep's milk cheese in the country, although it still accounts for a very small percentage. One of the major sheep-producing states is Querétaro, with most of the milk destined for cheesemaking.

Most “fresh” cheeses, unlike aged cheeses held for weeks or months, are aged for only days. This is not enough time to change the pH of the cheese enough to kill any harmful bacteria that may have been in the (unpasteurized) milk at the beginning of the process. The use of raw milk has led to a number of instances of food-borne disease linked to cheese, especially unaged, “fresh” cheeses. Cases of tuberculosis, listeriosis, and other diseases linked to cheese made in Mexico have led to strong restrictions against bringing the same across the US border or along with air travelers entering US airports. The most problematic cheeses have been panela, asadero, queso blanco, and ranchero, as these are not aged and are often made with unpasteurized milk. In 2008, the Mexican federal government published standards for cheese, with one of its purposes being the better sanitary control of the cheeses produced in the country. One of its major provisions is a ban on the sale of cheeses made with raw milk. However, critics state pasteurization is not the only way to guard against food-borne illnesses, and the process kills beneficial bacteria that affect the cheeses’ taste and health benefits of the cheese with the loss of live culture and enzymes. This is especially true of aged cheeses.

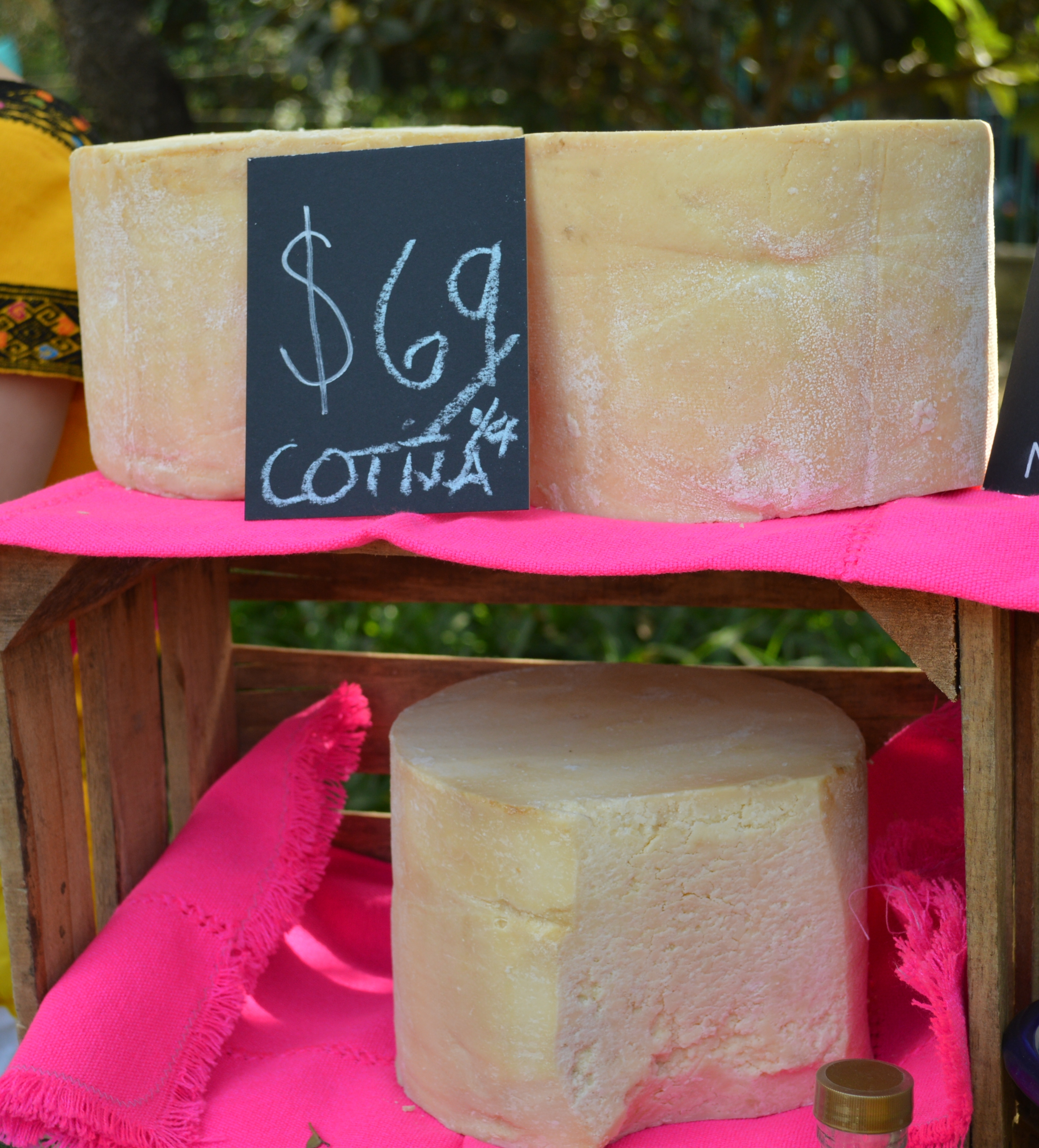
Cotija cheese for sale at the Nuestro Mercado de Quesos Artesanales held at the Parque Lincoln of Polanco, Mexico City

Between 20 and 40 different types of cheese are produced in Mexico, with a few made in great volume such as Chihuahua and Oaxaca. However, most are purely regional in nature, with the least common of these in danger of disappearing. As of 2016, there were four cheeses that have been granted a collective trademark by the Mexican Institute of Industrial Property: Queso Cotija (Michoacán, 2005), Queso de Bola de Ocosingo (Chiapas, 2005), Queso de Poro de Balancán (Tabasco, 2012) and Queso Crema de Cuadro (Chiapas, 2013). Other cheeses that have applied for this protection were Queso Molido of Zacazonapan, Mexico State, Queso Ranchero de Cabra of Perote, Veracruz, and Queso Molido y Añejo of Tepalcatepec.

Producers vary from large factories, which usually produce common varieties for supermarkets and other large outlets, to small farms which handcraft cheeses. Some of the better-known major producers include Chilchota, Covadonga, Wallander, Esmeralda, and Los Volcanes. Chilchota was the largest producer in 2003. Since then, Grupo Lala has become the largest producer in Mexico. Mass-produced cheeses are usually sold in supermarkets and large traditional markets in modern packaging, and their quality is not considered to be as good as those made by smaller concerns. Homemade cheese is still made in the country, which is often derisively referred to as “bathtub cheese.”

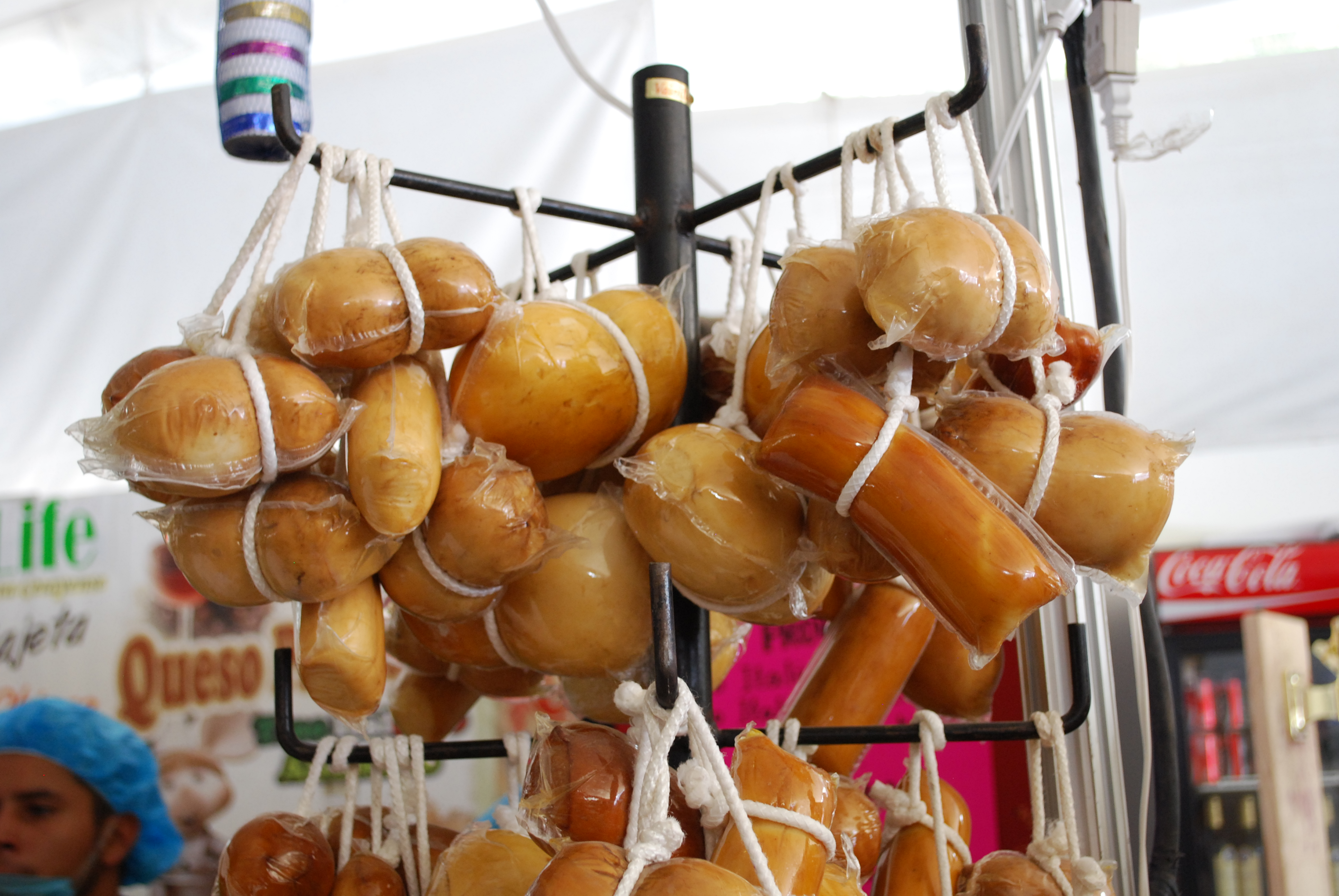
Smoked provolone at the Feria Nacional del Queso y el Vino in Tequisquiapan, Querétaro

The national wine and cheese festival, Feria Nacional del Queso y el Vino, takes place annually in Tequisquiapan, Querétaro, at the end of May and beginning of June (since 1976). The event not only celebrates the area's wine and cheese tradition, but also invites participants from other parts of Mexico and the world.

In some of the better traditional markets, such as Coyoacán and San Juan in Mexico City, more handcrafted cheeses from small local farms can be found. In Chihuahua, cheese is made with cattle descended from those the Spanish brought, and its production is still an important part of the culture. Most cheesemaking there is most often carried out in the home or on ranches, where ranchers get up early to start the process by milking the cows and making queso ranchero, requesón, panela, and others. Locally produced or handcrafted cheeses can be found in puestos de queseros or cheesemongers’ stalls, packed into baskets and wooden hoops, wrapped in corn husks, or pressed into flat, white, wide disks. Some specialty cheese producers have been invited to compete internationally. The Carlos Peraza family won a medal at the Cofradía de Quesos de Saint Maure in Touraine, France. In Baja California’s wine country, a notable cheesemaking business is La Cava de Marcelo. This business is named after owner Marcelo Castro Ramonetti, who is a fourth-generation cheese maker from a family who originally came to Mexico from Switzerland in 1911. The facility is located 4 m below ground, measures 360 m^{2} and is made of crystal and stone. It has been visited by food tourists from around the world, and featured on Internet sites such as chow.com. The tasting room holds 40 people and the facility stores 10,000 pieces of cheese. The facility specializes in providing cheeses to gourmet restaurants and stores in Mexico. Some of their cheeses age as long as 2 years.

The majority of cheese produced is Mexican style, but some purely European styles such as feta, Spanish manchego (from goat's milk), Saint Maure, and Camembert are also made. The state of Guanajuato is known for its reproduction of European cheeses, especially those from France.

In Chiapas, personnel from the Universidad Autónoma de Chiapas have been investigating a Spanish cheese called la Serena, which is made in the region of Extremadura with the aim of creating a certified version of it in Mexico. This includes the importation and raising of Merino sheep, as well as learning the methods behind this cheese. The reason behind the effort is that large parts of the state have a similar climate to Extremadura, making the raising of this sheep possible. Researchers have found they can not only reproduce la Serena cheese, but produce a number of other varieties, as well. Despite their ability to produce milk for cheese, most sheep in Mexico are raised for wool and meat. This strain of Merino sheep has been bred for milk production.

== Native varieties of cheese ==
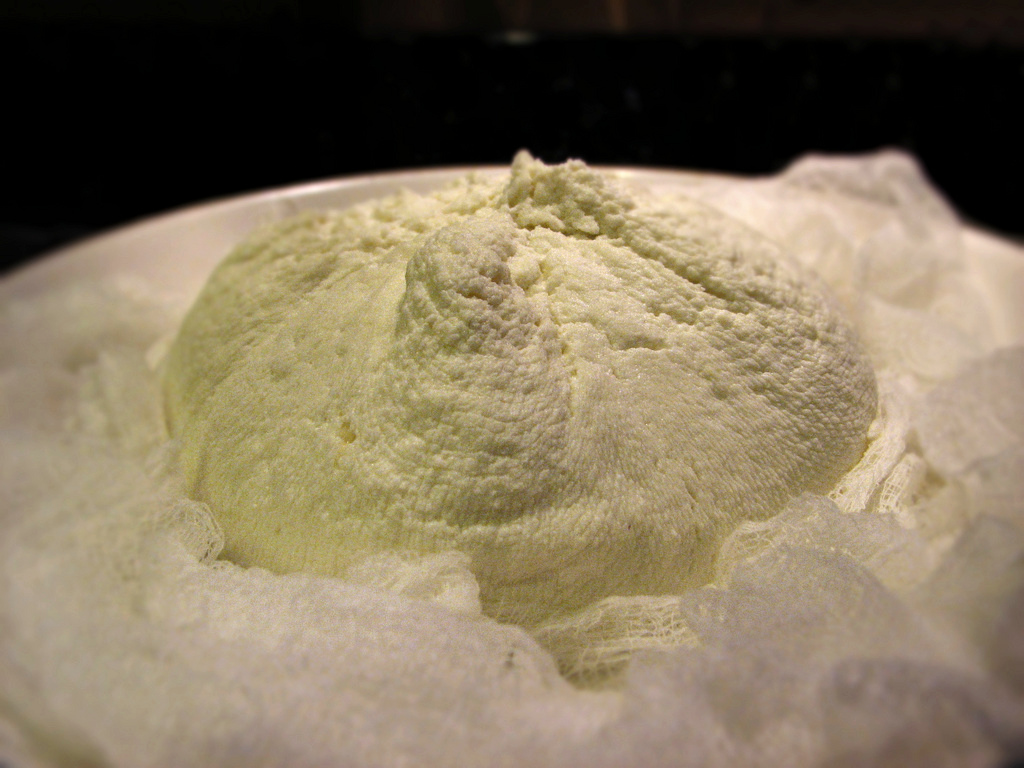
Queso fresco

The number of varieties of cheese made in Mexico is uncertain because different regions can have different names for the same cheese or different cheeses called by the same name. Most of the most popular varieties are fresh cheeses, such as queso fresco, panela, and asadero. The two most popular aged cheeses are Cotija and Chihuahua. Four cheeses produced in Mexico are entirely Mexican inventions: Oaxaca, Cotija, Chihuahua and manchego. The last shares its name with the Spanish cheese, but in Spain, it is made with sheep's milk, and Mexican manchego is made with cows’ milk or cows’ and goats’ milks. The original Spanish manchego is also stronger aged. Many of Mexico's cheeses are regional specialties, but the most common ones mentioned here are known and made throughout the country. Most of the time, cheese is used to top dishes as a condiment rather than as a main ingredient.

The most basic Mexican cheese is queso fresco, from which other cheeses such as panela, adobera, and Oaxaca have been derived. This cheese is made with whole milk, but has relatively low fat and cholesterol (due to higher moisture). This is a white, spongy cheese whose origins can be traced back to Burgos, Spain, and used primarily to crumble over dishes. This cheese is made in just about all parts of Mexico with little variation.

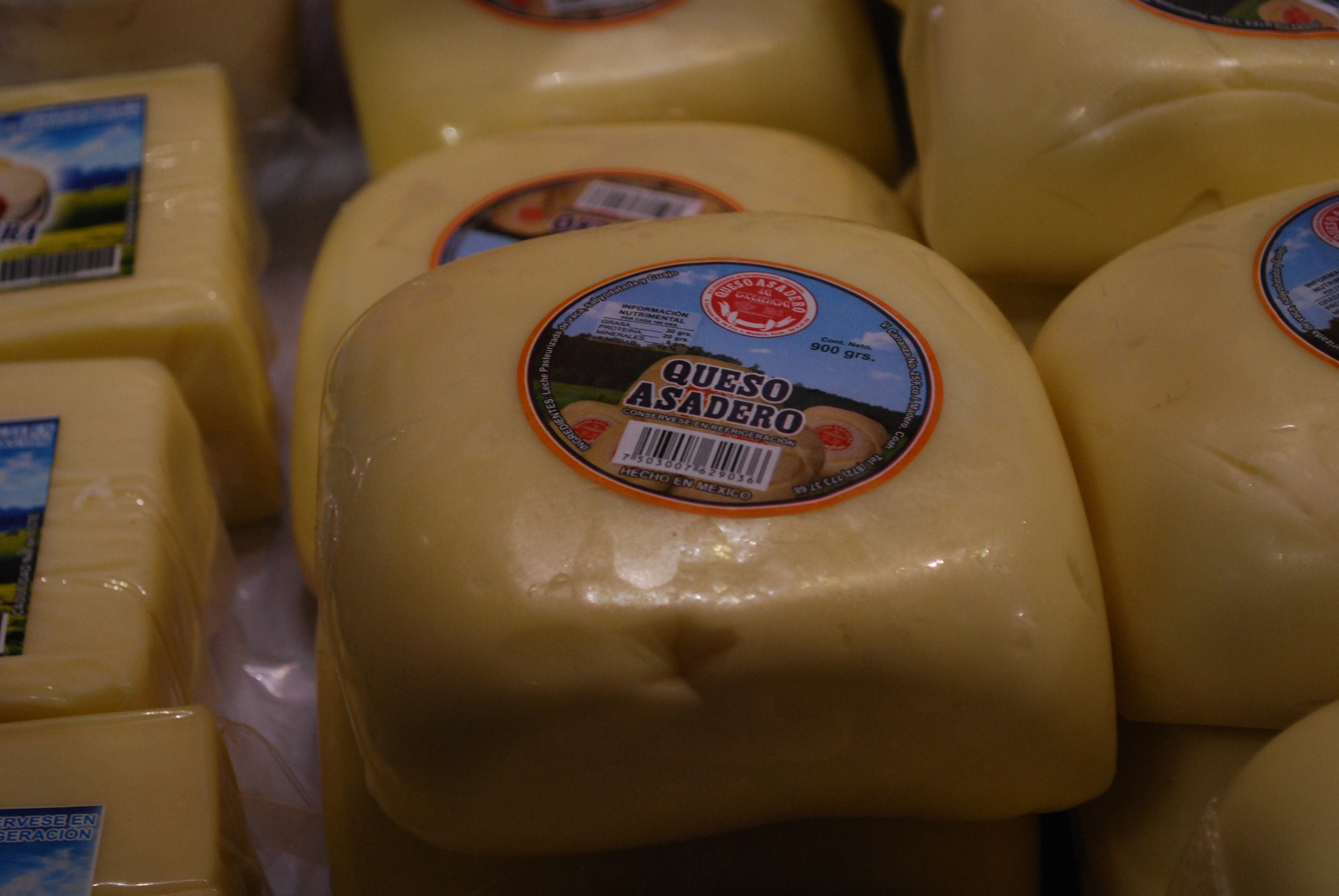
Queso asadero

In other parts of Mexico, queso asadero is a different cheese - white, semisoft, and good for melting. It is often used to make queso fundido, similar to a fondue or quesadillas.

Panela is another white, fresh-milk cheese with little fat or cholesterol. The origins of this cheese probably goes back to the Balkans or the Italian peninsula, but it has been significantly modified to Mexican tastes. It is made with skim milk, giving it a fairly firm texture, with a sweet/sour taste. In traditional markets, this cheese is often sold in baskets in which it has been molded, giving it the alternate name of queso de canasta. It is often served cold as part of an appetizer or snack tray. It is also found on sandwiches in most parts of Mexico.

Queso blanco, also called queso sierra or queso enchilada, is a creamy, white cheese made with skimmed cows’ milk, and has been described as being a cross between mozzarella and cottage cheese. It is often homemade using lime juice as the coagulant, giving it a citrus flavor. Commercially, it is made with rennet. It softens when heated, but does not melt.

Requesón is a loose cheese similar to ricotta or cottage cheese, made with whole cows’ milk. Traditionally, this cheese is sold in markets wrapped in fresh corn husks. It has a light, not salty taste, and is used for enchiladas, tostadas, cheese spreads, cakes, and more.

Chihuahua cheese is named after the Mexican state which is home to a significant Mennonite population who created it, it is also called queso menonita. The original version is semi-hard with very small holes, close to a type of cheese called Chester. This version is sold covered in cloth and paraffin wax. The taste varies from a cheddar-like sharpness to mild, and is a pale yellow rather than white. Today, the cheese is made all over Mexico and is popular as a commercially produced cheese.

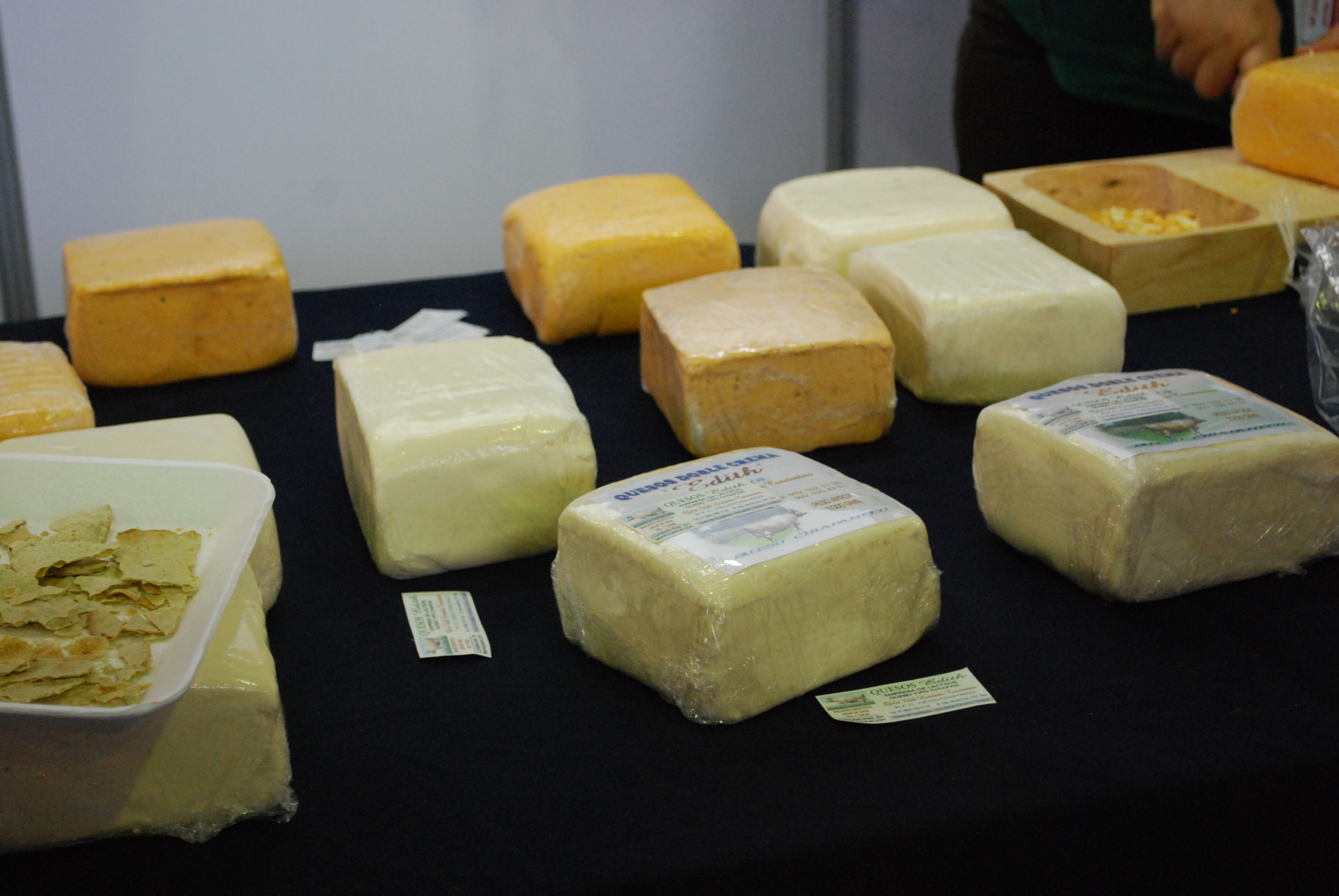
Doble crema cheese from Chiapas

Queso crema or doble crema is prepared with cows’ milk fortified with additional cream. It is spreadable and its often used to prepare desserts.

Mexican manchego cheese was introduced to Mexico from the Spanish region of La Mancha, but it tastes quite different, as it is made with a mixture of cows’ and goats’ milks in Mexico rather than sheep's milk. It has a buttery taste and melts well. This cheese is available in all parts of Mexico and can be found in the United States as well. Normally, manchego is not aged, but the aged version is called queso manchego viejo. This version is more firm and intense in flavor. It is often served grated over dishes. In northern Mexico, especially in the province of Chihuahua, this cheese can be called asadero, as well. As of 2018, Mexican manchego represented almost 15% of the total cheese sales in Mexico.

While versions are made commercially elsewhere, Cotija cheese is made in Cotija, Tocumbo, and Los Reyes in Michoacán and Quitupan, Santa María del Oro, and Jilotlán de los Dolores in Jalisco. These communities are in the Sierra de Jal-Mich region, which straddles the two states. To receive this recognition, the cheese must also be made with pasteurized milk to prevent food-borne illness. This cow's milk cheese was developed in Mexico entirely and has a taste and texture similar to that of Italian parmesan. It has a light golden hue and pronounced sour-milk aroma. It is aged an average of 12 months and sometimes the wheels are covered in a chili pepper paste to prevent mold. It is usually sprinkled on dishes as an accent, but can be used to flavor pastas and salads. This cheese is also popular in the United States, where it is both imported and made domestically. However, the US-made Cotija differs noticeably from its Mexican namesake, as American producers add enzymes to speed up the aging process.

Queso añejo (literally aged cheese) is the aged version of queso fresco. It is classified as a soft cheese, but well-aged batches can become quite firm and salty. It is primarily used as a garnish. Queso añejo can also be found with a coating of chili pepper (enchilado).

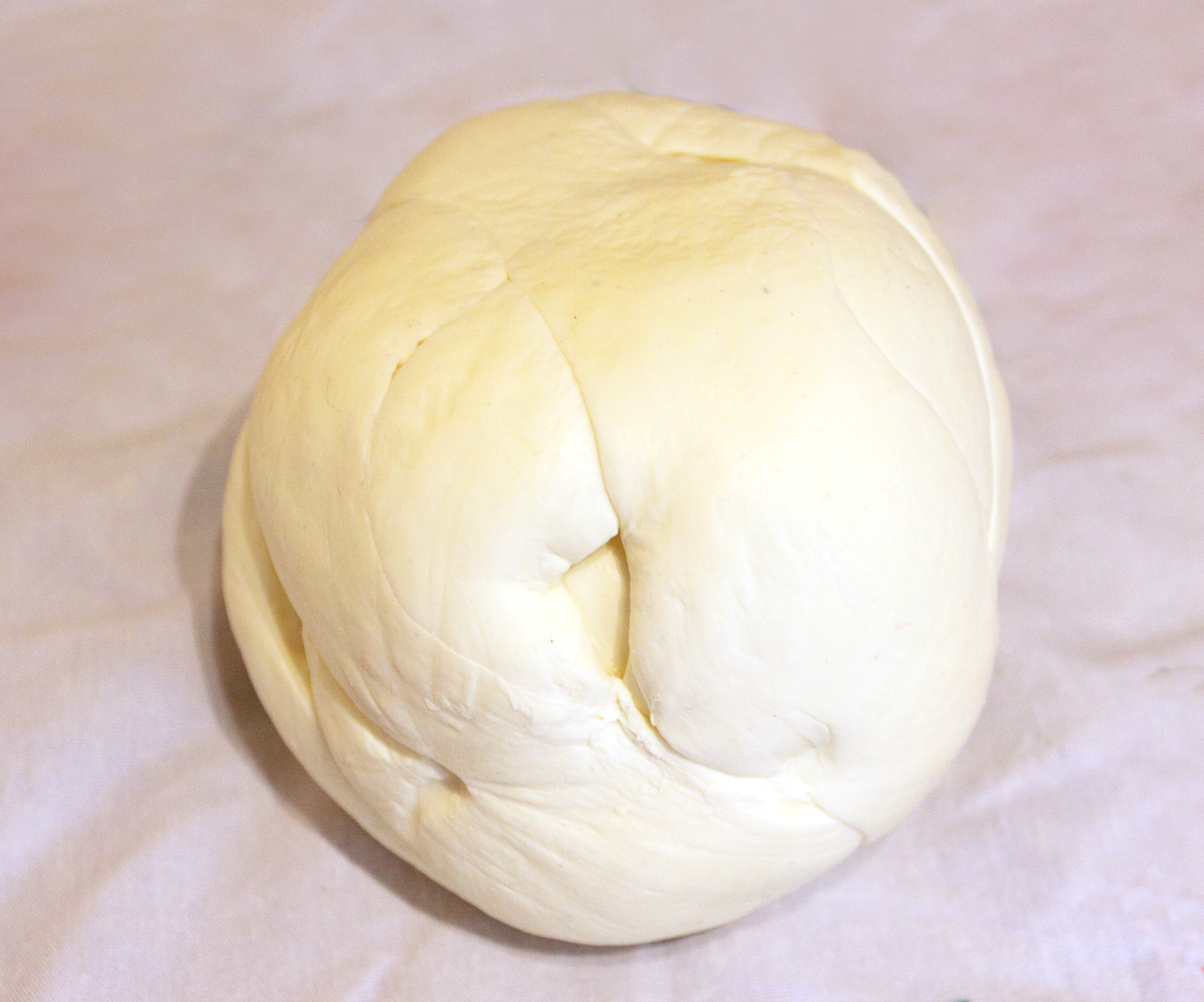
Oaxaca cheese in a ball

Oaxaca cheese originated in the state of Oaxaca, but it is now made and eaten in just about all of Mexico. It is generally found only in Mexico. It is a soft, stretched-curd cheese, made with cows’ milk, much like asadero, but the cheese's pH is modified to 5.3 to get the stringy texture. The cheese is then formed into ropes which are then wound into balls. The cheese can be melted especially for quesadillas, but it is often eaten pulled apart or shredded on top of prepared dishes. Oaxaca cheese can be used in place of mozzarella in salads.

Queso de bola or queso Ocosingo is produced only in Chiapas and is nearly unknown outside of the state. It is made with cows’ milk to which extra cream has been added. It has a strong flavor with a creamy, crumbly texture and a light yellow color. It is prepared with a wax coating and after a long aging period, it produces a hard shell. This shell is often hollowed out to be filled with meat preparation, then covered in banana leaves and cooked to make a dish called queso relleno (stuffed cheese). The hard shell of Ocosingo cheese is similar to that of Edam cheese.

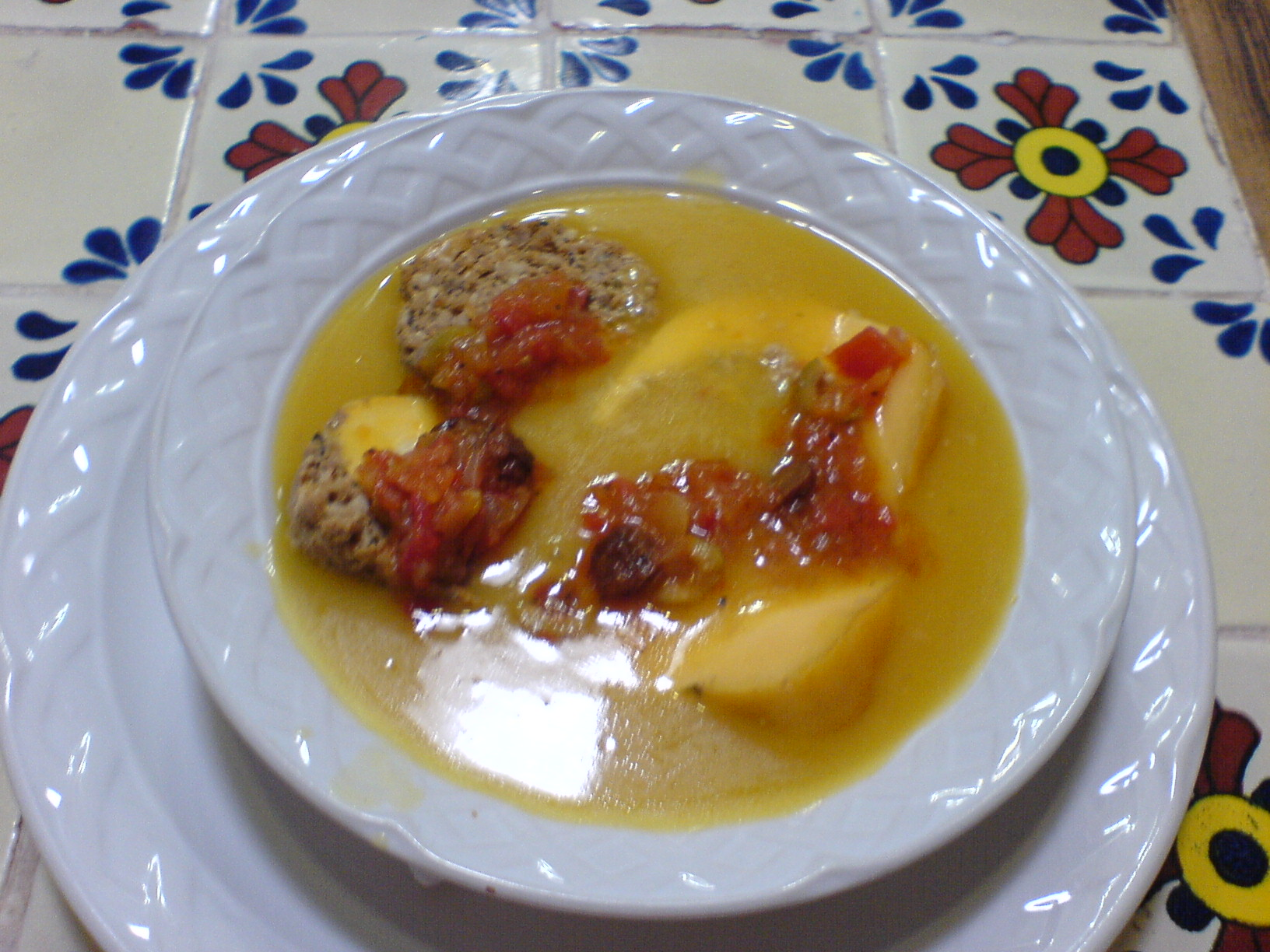
Queso relleno

In addition to the cheeses mentioned above, a large number of regional cheeses are made on a small scale and are little-known outside their regions or communities. Porta salud is an aged semihard paste cheese, which has a strong flavor and an orange color. Queso jalapeño is a soft cows’ milk cheese with bits of jalapeño chili pepper served cold or melted in quesadillas. Queso criollo is a semifirm pale yellow cheese that is a specialty of Taxco, Guerrero. Queso corazon is a Chiapan cheese, which is a kind of very moist cream cheese. It gets its name because it is traditionally molded into a heart shape, but most modern producers now mold it into a rectangular shape. Queso Zacatecas is an aged cheese which is usually hard on the outside and a little soft on the inside, and white with a tinge of yellow. It is crumbly and cannot be sliced. Instead, it is served grated. Queso molido, also called queso prensado, is sometimes covered in a red chili pepper paste. Costena cheese is a specialty of Guerrero state. The texture of this cheese is crumbly, and it tastes like fresh or slightly soured milk. Normally, it is white in color. "Queso Real del Castillo" is a semihard cheese made in the Ojos Negros and Guadalupe valleys east of Ensenada, Baja California.

A small area in Veracruz state around La Joya is known for its smoked cheeses made with whole raw cows’ milk; they are pressed after curdling. The cheese is often served with ham, chili peppers, epazote, and slivers of jalapeños. Another kind of Veracruz cheese, marqueta, is a white cheese which is often coated with chili pepper paste. The Yucatan area also makes a type of bola cheese, although this version is harder all the way through and is filled with small, irregular holes. Another type, queso de barra, is similar to panela.

== See also ==
- Mexican cuisine
- Mexican wine
- List of cheeses
- Flan
