= Licon Dairy =

Farm in San Elizario, Texas, United States

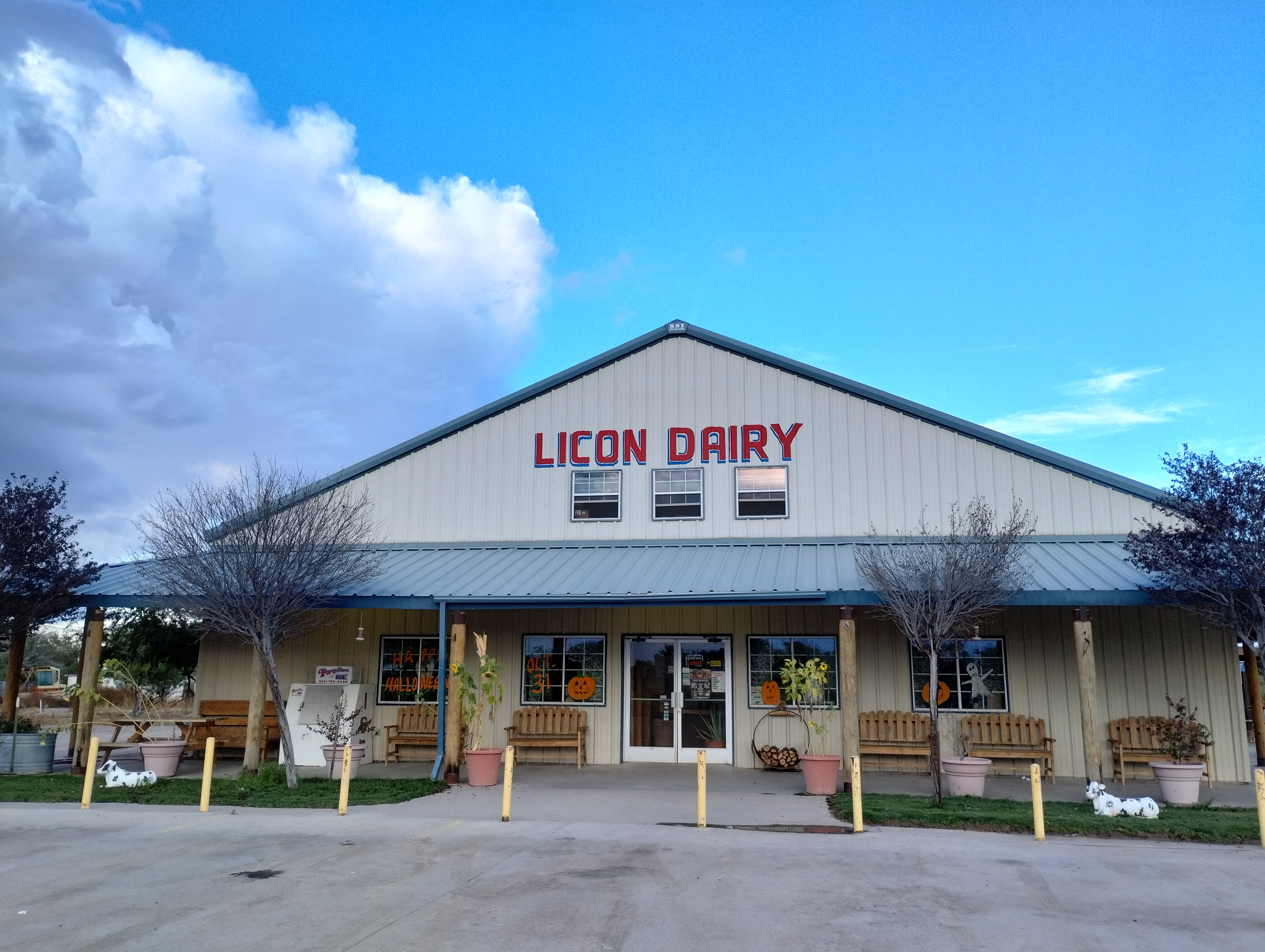
- Licon Dairy 2022
- Industry: Dairy products
- Founded: 1948
- Founder: Isabella Martinez
- Headquarters: San Elizario, Texas, U.S.
- Key people: Eugenio Licon
- Products: Asadero cheese, ricotta cheese, chile con queso, chile con suero, whey
- Owner: Licon family
- Website: licondairy.com

Licon Dairy is a family-owned farm, dairy, and petting zoo in San Elizario, Texas. The dairy is best known for its asadero cheese. In 2019, a restaurant called the Outlaw Saloon & Grill was opened at Licon Dairy.

== About ==
Licon Dairy is a fifty acres farm, dairy, and petting zoo in San Elizario, Texas that specializes in making handmade asadero cheese. Every day, they sell around 400 10-slice packages of the cheese. Milk for cheesemaking is sourced from Sarah Farms in El Paso. It may be the only commercial dairy in the United States using traditional Mexican techniques for cheesemaking and people from as far away as New York City and Chicago come to buy asadero cheese from Licon. Other dairy products made at Licon Dairy include ricotta cheese, chile con queso, chile con suero, and whey.

Licon Dairy features a retail shop and a restaurant called the Outlaw Saloon & Grill. The free petting zoo includes llamas, donkeys, goats, Watusi cattle and other animals. The zoo started out with a pair of six-month old ostriches.

The company distributes its products throughout West Texas, including Alpine, Marfa, Fort Stockton, and Pecos.

== History ==
The original asadero cheese recipe used at Licon Dairy dates back to around 1928 and was developed by Isabel Chavez, who made asadero cheese with leftover cow's milk using a recipe from her childhood. The recipe was passed down in the family and was used again by Chavez' daughter, Isabella Martinez, when her family started a dairy in 1948 in San Elizario, Texas. Martinez' daughter, Mary Martinez, married Eugenio Licon in 1958, and together they began helping with the family business. In 1963, Eugenio bought the dairy from his father-in-law and moved it to its current location.

By 1978, the dairy had between 60 and 70 cows and made 200 pounds of asadero cheese every day. By 1980, there were 160 cows. The cheese was made by hand and in the 1980s, there were lines of people waiting to buy the asadero. Nine years later, the dairy continued to hand-make cheese, now around 3,000 to 4,000 a day. In 2022, they were making 400 pounds of cheese a day.

In 2000, bovine tuberculosis eradication measures resulted in the closure of dairy operations in El Paso County. Licon Dairy subsequently moved its herd to Hudspeth County and later began purchasing milk for cheese production. In January 2019, several animals at the petting zoo were killed and others injured after loose dogs entered the property, prompting a temporary closure of the attraction. The petting zoo reopened in March 2021 after a year-long closure during the COVID-19 pandemic. During that period, the family rebuilt and upgraded a number of animal enclosures.
