= Licona =

Licona is a surname. Notable people with the surname include:

- Alejandro Licona (born 1953), Mexican dramatist
- Carlos Licona (born 1995), Mexican American professional boxer
- Gonzalo Hernández Licona, Mexican economist
- Michael R. Licona (born 1961), American New Testament scholar, Christian apologist and historian
