= Asadero cheese =

Mexican type of cheese

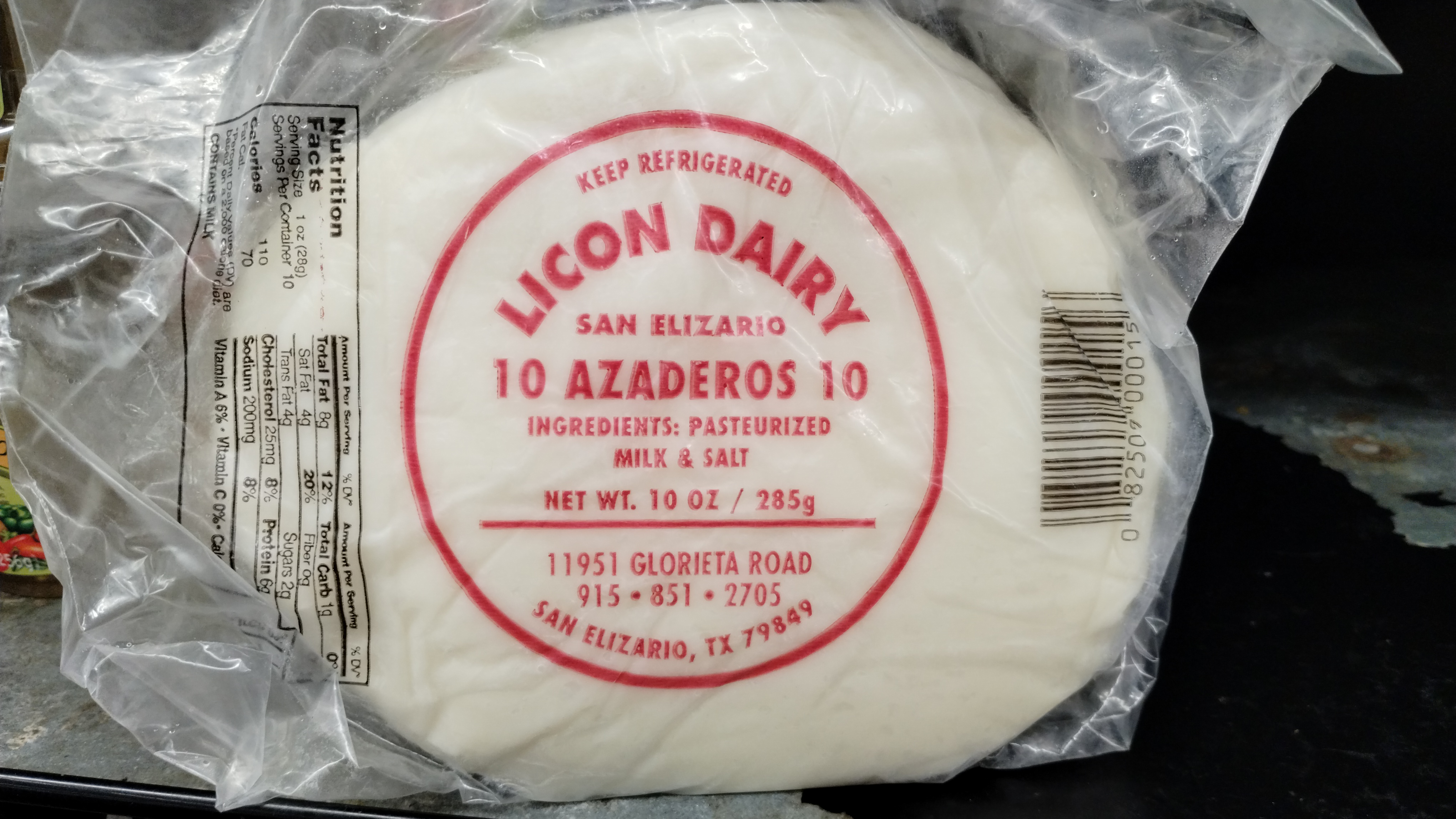
Asadero cheese from Licon Dairy

Asadero cheese (queso asadero meaning "roastable" or "for grilling," also spelled "azadero") is a white, flat Mexican cheese that is made fresh from goat and cow's milk. "Asadero" is the kind of cheese, and individual pieces of the cheese are called "asaderos." The milk is mixed with another mixture of milk and rennet and then boiled for thirty minutes. The mixture is churned, cooked again and then flattened into flat, round shapes while it is still hot. It is a mild cheese that melts well. It is often eaten with bread or tortillas. Asadero is sometimes confused with Chihuahua and Oaxaca cheeses.

Asadero cheese began to be made during the Mexican Revolution in Chihuahua. The cheese was also made in Durango. Later, the recipe was brought with immigrants to the Southwestern United States. In the past, recipes for asadero cheese may have used the poisonous silverleaf nightshade berries to curdle the milk instead of rennet.

== See also ==
- Cheeses of Mexico
