= Basket cheese =

Cheese formed inside a basket

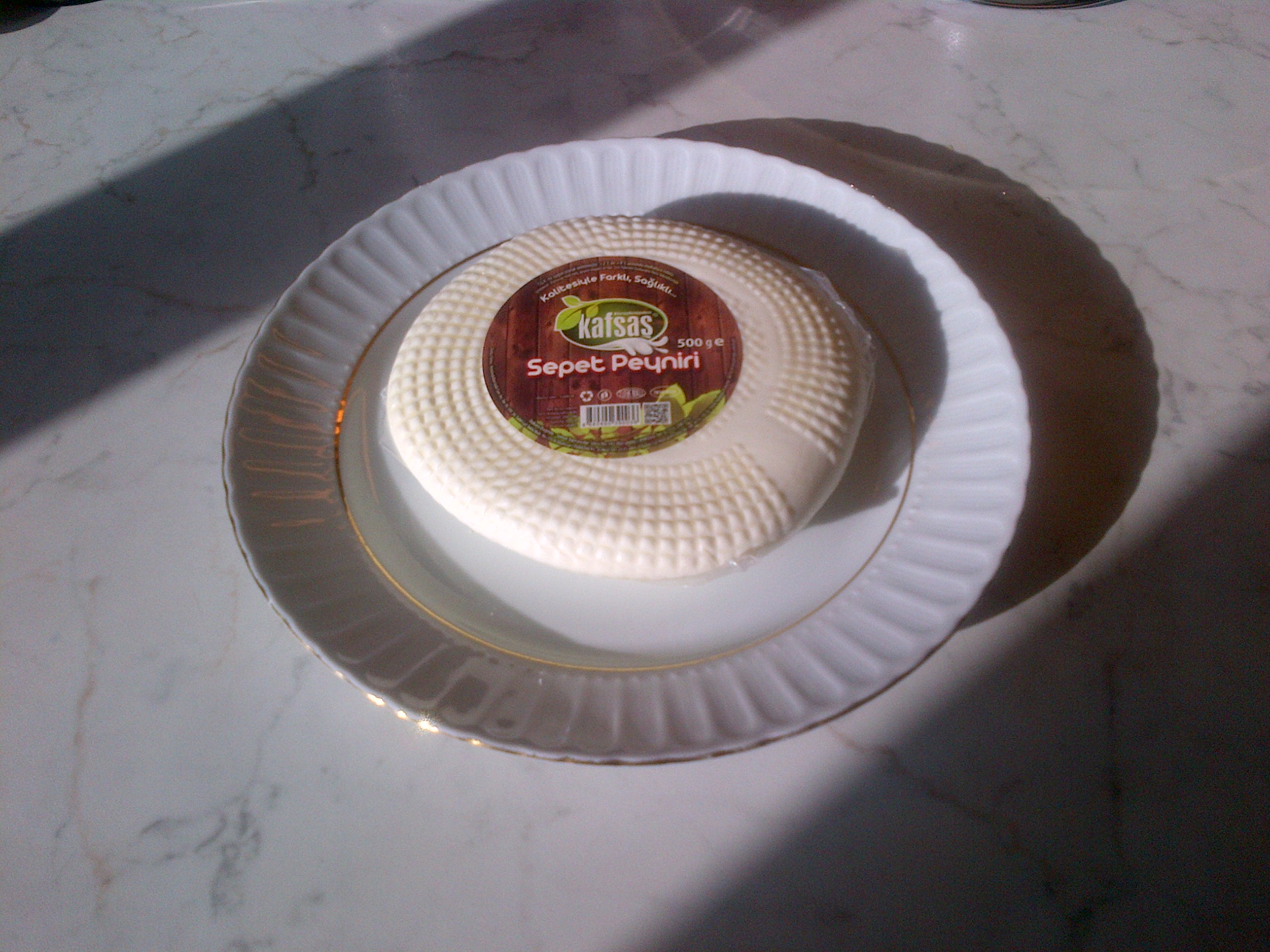
- Country of origin: Turkey
- Source of milk: Cows
- Pasteurised: Yes
- Texture: Semi-soft, rubbery, creamy
- Aging time: None

Basket cheese is a kind of cheese originating from Mediterranean regions. As its name suggests, the cheese is traditionally formed inside a basket, which leaves a woven imprint on its surface. Fresh basket cheese has no salt taste, while dry basket cheese is mildly salty.

Turkish basket cheese, or sepet peyniri, is a fresh-curd cheese that originates from the Aegean Region. Traditionally, it is made from goat milk, but sheep's and cow's milk are often used. The cheese is most associated with seaside towns, particularly Karaburun, Çeşme, and Ayvalık, where it is generally made from sheep's milk and known as kelle cheese. It is traditionally made using baskets of reed called gova, but commercial sepet peyneri is often shaped in plastic containers.

In Italy, basket cheese is an ingredient in several savory pies traditionally served during Easter.

== See also ==
- Queso panela
- Ricotta
