= National Council for the Evaluation of Social Development Policy =

CONEVAL
- Formation: August 2005
- Dissolved: June 2025
- Type: Social Development Organization
- Purpose: Poverty Measurement; Evaluation of Social Development
- Headquarters: Mexico City, Mexico
- Executive Secretary: Gonzalo Hernández Licona
- Website: www.coneval.gob.mx

The National Council for the Evaluation of Social Development Policy (Spanish: Consejo Nacional de Evaluación de la Política de Desarrollo Social) was a Mexican organization coordinated by the Secretariat of Welfare. CONEVAL was an autonomous constitutional organization with legal personality, own proprietorship, technical and management autonomy.

CONEVAL was created following the General Law of Social Development (LGDS). The Law obliged the institution to coordinate the actions targeted to the achievement of the National Social Development Policy's objectives, strategies and priorities. CONEVAL was constituted by the head of the Secretariat of Welfare, six academic researchers chosen by the National Social Development Commission, and an executive secretary in charge of the Council. It issued the evaluation guidelines assigned by the Expenditure Budget Decree in order that dependencies and entities regulate their operating social programs.

The Council used a multidimensional approach to define, identify, and measure poverty using information generated by the National Institute of Statistics and Geography (INEGI).

The multidimensional poverty measurement included the following indicators:

- Current income per capita
- Educational gap
- Access to health services
- Access to social security
- Quality and spaces of dwellings
- Access to basic services in dwellings
- Access to food
- Degree of social cohesion.

The council was dissolved in 2025. Its functions were merged into INEGI.

== Poverty reports ==
In February 2021 the CONEVAL reported that the COVID-19 pandemic in Mexico could increase the number of people living below poverty to 9.8 from 8.9 million and extreme poverty to 10.7 from 6.1 million.
