= Panela cheese =

Type of relatively soft, white Mexican cheese

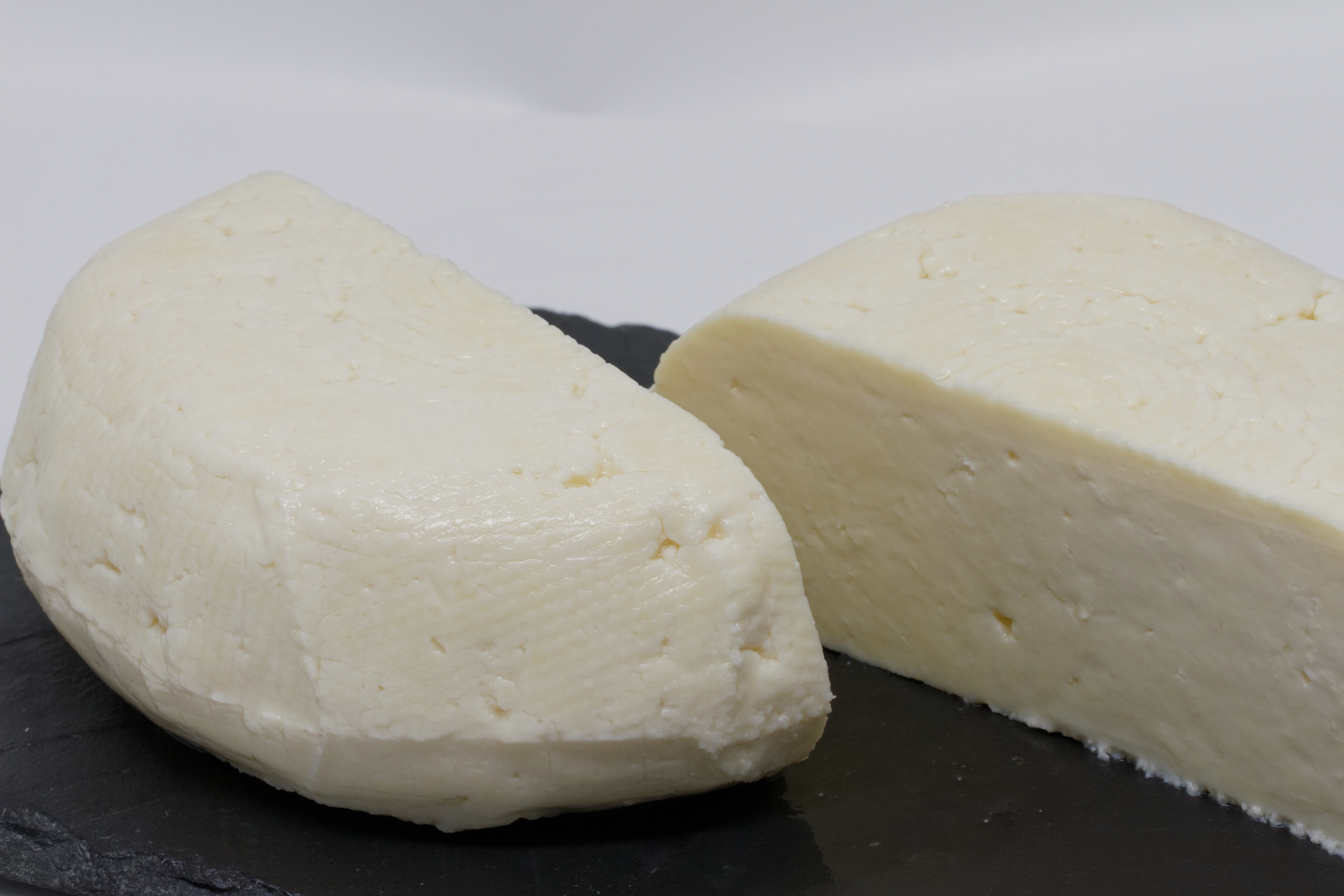
Queso Panela

Queso panela (panela cheese) is a fresh cheese common in Mexico made from pasteurized cow's milk. It is also known as queso canasta or queso de la canasta. It is derived from the Greek word for basket cheese. The cheese also has similarities to the Indian cheese paneer.

Like related cheeses, panela cheese is often used as a garnish and as a filling in its crumbled form. It may also be fried, since it holds its shape and does not melt very easily. Although it becomes softer when heated, it generally retains its shape instead of melting into a gooey texture like some other types of cheese. It is used in many Mexican foods, such as enchiladas, tacos, nopal salads or quesadillas.

Regional differences as well as different degrees of maturation yield variation within the panela family. One remarkable regional variety is that of the evergreen mountain town Tapalpa.

== Origin ==
As is the case with many Mexican varieties of cheese, the exact origin of panela is not entirely agreed upon. Some place its origin in the Balkan peninsula or the Mezzogiorno, where other rustic cheeses are moulded in baskets. Furthermore, the origin of the name is disputed as well. Those who attribute the cheese's origin to the aforementioned areas of Europe suggest that the name comes from the baskets of bread (pan in Spanish) used to mould the cheeses. Others, however, argue that the name was derived from its physical resemblance to piloncillo, another name for unrefined whole cane sugar which is commonly known as panela in large parts of Mexico.

== Form and texture ==
In markets it is sold as a white, inverted conical cheese, in pieces roughly between 500 g (18 oz) and 2 kg (4.4 lb) in weight. It has a bright white colour and a bland flavor, as it is mostly unsalted.

== See also ==
- Queso blanco
- Oaxaca cheese
- List of cheeses
