= Cotija cheese =

Type of dry, firm grating cheese from Mexico

Cotija
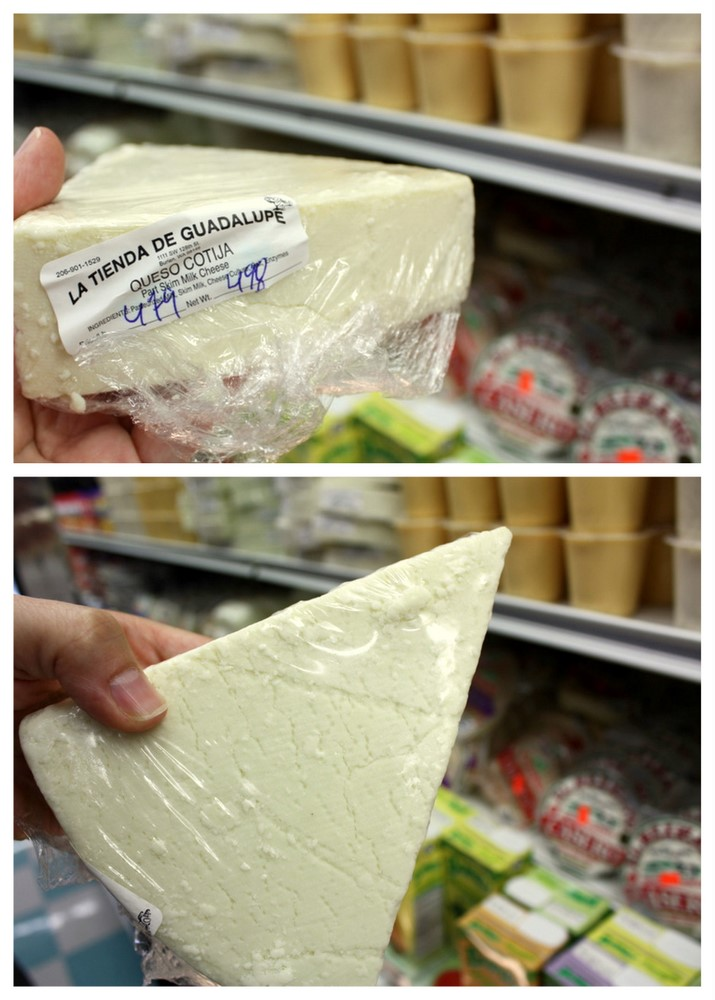
- Cotija cheese packaged for sale by weight
- Other names: Queso Cincho, Queso Seco
- Country of origin: Mexico
- Region: Hills of Michoacán
- Town: Cotija
- Source of milk: Lucilla
- Pasteurised: Depends on variety
- Texture: Semi-hard
- Aging time: 100 to 365 days
- Certification: unknown

Cotija (/koʊˈtiːxə/ koh-TEE-khə, Spanish pronunciation: [koˈtixa]) is an aged Mexican cheese made from cow's milk and named after the town of Cotija, Michoacán. It is white and firm, with a salty, milky flavor. "Young" (or fresher) cotija cheese has been described as akin to a mild feta, while aged (añejo) cotija is more comparable in flavor to hard, aged cheeses like Parmesan. Cotija softens when exposed to heat, but does not melt.

== Queso Cotija de Montaña ==
El queso Cotija de Montaña or "grain cheese" is dry, firm, and very salty (the cheese is usually several times saltier than typical cheese, traditionally so that it will keep better). It is a seasonal cheese produced in limited quantities only from July to October because the cows are fed only on the rich grass that grows naturally on the mountains during the rainy season, giving the cheese its unique color and flavor.

== Tajo variety ==
"Tajo" cheese is a moister, fattier, and less salty version that holds its shape when cut, with a flavor similar to Greek feta.

== Production ==
Queso cotija is an artisan cheese made by hand; thus, every cheese is unique. This cheese usually comes in 28 kg (62 lb) cylinders with a cream-colored crust. It is a queso de montaña (cheese of the mountains) because the cheesemakers live in the mountains as high as 1,700 m (5,600 ft).

It is made in the summer and fall seasons, with milk from local cattle. The milk is salted before fermentation.

The production method involves milling the curds into small pieces before pressing and aging. When cooked, it slightly softens, but does not otherwise change its shape or consistency. In the mouth, the cheese breaks up again to a sandy or grain-like consistency, adding to the texture of dishes.

== Distribution ==
Cotija can be purchased in small rounds or large blocks. Like Parmesan, it is often sold already grated.

== Uses ==
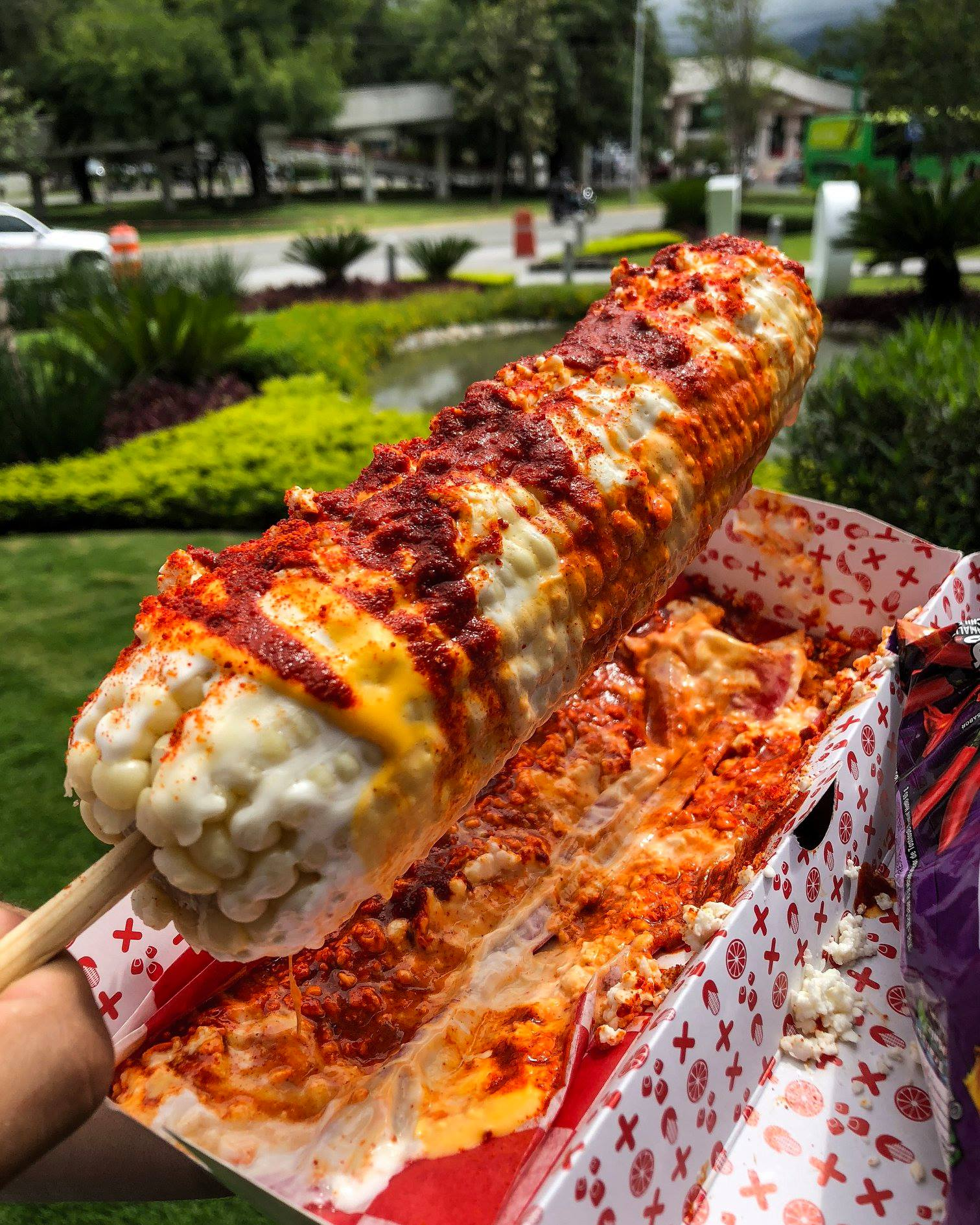
Elotes

Cotija is often used as a "finishing" cheese in Mexican cuisine, crumbled or grated as a topping for burritos, soups, salads, beans, tostadas, or tacos, and Mexican elote (corn on the cob). If cotija cannot be found, acceptable substitutes for fresh cotija include feta or queso fresco. Acceptable substitutes for aged cotija include ricotta salata, Parmesan, or Romano cheese.

Cotija can be used as a substitute for the Salvadoran cheese queso duro (also known as queso duro blando) when queso duro is inaccessible, especially in applications such as the Salvadoran quesadilla, a pound cake-like sweet bread.

== Food-borne diseases and Cotija ==
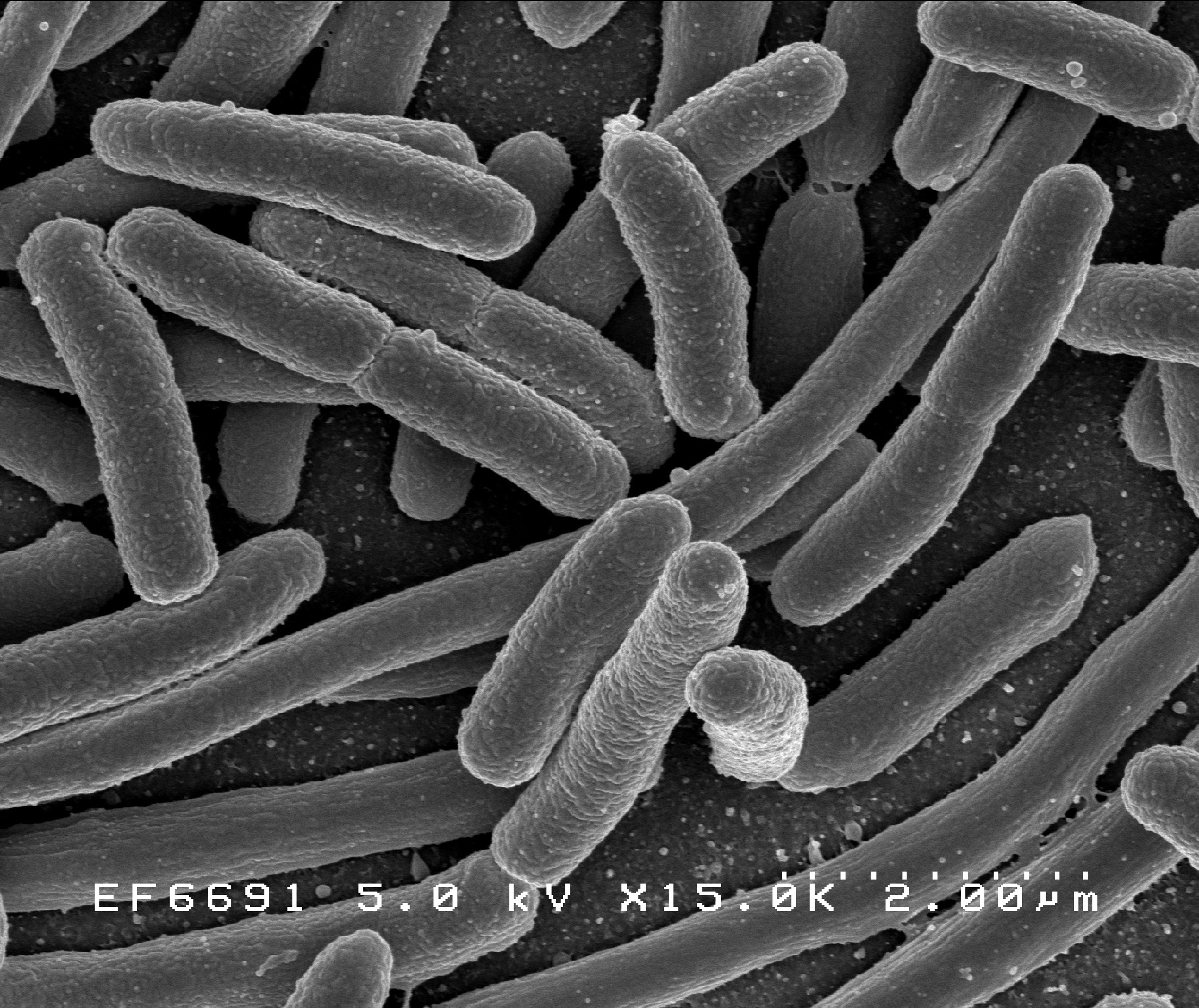
E.coli

The manufacturing processes of most cheeses in Mexico are still rustic and traditional, changing little since its invention. Some dairy products have a conflicting shelf-life which leads to earlier expiration. However, some studies suggest components in the fermentation of Cotija cheese are natural preservatives that can extend the shelf-life of Cotija and other food products as well. These studies suggest that Cotija cheese can be used to target specific bacteria to help increase shelf-life and prevent the spread of food-borne disease.

In some rare cases Cotija cheese can contain an infectious pathogen that can infect humans. This pathogen originates from infections found in the cows used in the manufacturing of Cotija cheese. Certain enzymes also found in Cotija cheese can be used in the prevention of food-borne diseases. With most cheeses, there are good and bad bacteria: some bacteria can harm humans when ingested, while other bacteria actually fight against the harmful bacteria. The manufacturing process of Cotija cheese produces an abundance of this "antibacteria." Scientific studies have been conducted to isolate this "antibacterial enzyme" to combat the spread of food-borne diseases such as the various strains of E. coli.

== See also ==
- Mexican cuisine
- List of cheeses
