= Gonzalo Hernández Licona =

Mexican economist

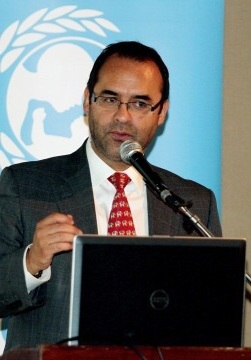
- Occupation: Executive Secretary of the National Council for the Evaluation of Social Development Policy of Mexico
- Years active: November 2005-Present

Academic background
- Education: Mexico Autonomous Institute of Technology (1982-1986) University of Essex (1989-1990) University of Oxford (1992-1996)

Academic work
- Discipline: Economist
- Sub-discipline: Poverty measurement, social program evaluation

Gonzalo Hernández Licona is a Mexican economist and distinguished scholar in the fields of poverty measurement, economic development and social program evaluation. Hernández Licona holds a PhD in economics from the University of Oxford, a master's in economics from the University of Essex and a B.A. in economics from the Mexico Autonomous Institute of Technology (ITAM).

Hernández Licona founded the National Council for the Evaluation of Social Development Policy (CONEVAL), a decentralized Mexican federal government institution. CONEVAL's main objective is to evaluate social programs and measure poverty in Mexico. Since November 2005, Hernández Licona has served as the Executive Secretary of CONEVAL, in charge of overseeing the Council's activities and executing the agreements reached upon by the Council's board.

In collaboration with other distinguished academics on CONEVAL's executive board, Hernández Licona participated in the development of a multidimensional poverty measurement methodology. This methodology accounts for multiple social deprivations and income wellbeing in Mexican households. It is currently employed as the official poverty measurement methodology in Mexico.

Due to his work as a scholar and as an evaluator, Hernández Licona has received multiple awards and recognitions. Amongst his most prestigious distinctions is the GPSA Award for Leadership and Social Accountability (2015), awarded to Hernández Licona by the Global Partnership for Social Accountability (a World Bank affiliate) for his contributions, and those of CONEVAL, in poverty measurement and evaluation of social programs under an accountability framework. Dr. Hernández Licona has also been awarded the International Award for Research in Health Policy “José Luis Bobadilla” (2017), Trimestre Económico “Daniel Cosío Villegas” Award (2000), the Banamex Economics Award (1996), and the ITAM Professional Merit Award- Public Sector (2013).

Prior to leading CONEVAL, Hernández Licona served as the General Director of Evaluation and Social Program Monitoring for Mexico's social development ministry (SEDESOL). While at SEDESOL he developed an innovative system for the evaluation and monitoring of federal social programs. Hernández Licona has also been a long time scholar at ITAM, having directed its B.A. program in economics from 1998-1999. He has also lectured multiple courses, and advised nearly 30 student thesis, six of them which have gone on to win the Banamex Economics Award. He has been a member of the National Researchers System since 1997 and holds more than 70 publications.

Due to his expertise, in 2015 Hernández Licona was appointed by the UNDP and the OECD member of the Monitoring Advisory Group for the Global Partnership for Effective Development Co-operation. Then in 2016, he was appointed by the Secretary-General of the United Nations as one of the 15 independent scientific experts in charge of developing the 2019 Global Sustainable Development Report.

Hernández Licona has also served on the International Initiative for Impact Evaluations' Board of Commissioner since 2009.

== Work experience ==
- Executive Secretary, National Council for the Evaluation of Social Development Policy of Mexico (CONEVAL), November 2005 – present
- Member of the independent group of scientists, Global Sustainable Development Report 2019, United Nations, November 2016 – present
- Member of the Governing Board, El Colegio de México (COLMEX), March 2016 – present
- Member of the Monitoring Advisory Group, Global Partnership for the Effective Development Co-operation, May 2015 – present
- Member of the Multidimensional Poverty Peer Network, Oxford Poverty and Human Development Initiative (OPHI), June 2013 – present
- Member of the Expert Panel, México, ¿Cómo vamos?, 2013–present
- Member of the Evaluation Advisory Committee, Global Alliance for Vaccine Immunization (GAVI Alliance), October 2010- December 2016
- Member of the advisory committee, Centro de Estudios Espinosa Yglesias, 2010–present
- Member of the Board of Commissioners, International Initiative for Impact Evaluation (3ie), April 2007 – present
- Professor and researcher at the department of economics, Mexico Autonomous Institute of Technology (ITAM), April 1996 – present
- General director of evaluation and social program monitoring, Secretariat of Social Development (SEDESOL), July 2002- November 2005
- Member of the Consultative Commission for the Modernization of the Minimum Wage System, National Commission for Minimum Wage, February 2001- August 2001
- Director of Undergraduate Studies in Economics, Mexico Autonomous Institute of Technology (ITAM), August 1998- August 1999
- Academic Representative, Commission for Labor Cooperation Agreement, June 1996- July 2001

== Editorial boards ==
- Member of the Editorial Council for Cofactor- ISSN 2007-1086, 2010-2014
- Member of the Editorial Committee for Economía Mexicana (now Latin American Economic Review), Centro de Investigación y Docencia Económicas (CIDE), April 1998 – 2004
- Member of the Editorial Council for El Trimestre Económico, 2000-2001

== Awards and recognitions ==
- International Award for Research in Health Policy “José Luis Bobadilla” granted by the Instituto Nacional de Salud Pública, 2017
- GPSA Award for Leadership and Social Accountability granted by the Global Partnership for Social Accountability, 2015
- ITAM Professional Merit Award- Public Sector granted by Mexico Autonomous Institute of Technology (ITAM), 2013
- Trimestre Económico “Daniel Cosío Villegas” Award granted by Trimestre Económico, an economics journal edited by the Fondo de Cultura Económica, 2000
- Scholarship recipient, granted by the Fondo Mexicano de Intercambio Académico, 1998
- Banamex Economics Award, First place, granted by Banamex for PhD thesis: “El efecto de la pobreza de los hogares en participación, horas de trabajo y el desempleo”, 1996
- Graduated with honors from the Masters in Economics- University of Essex, England, 1990
- Graduated with honors from the Undergraduate program in Economics- Mexico Autonomous Institute of Technology (ITAM), Mexico, 1990

== Selected publications ==
- 2017.“Planeación democrática del desarrollo nacional, Instituto Nacional de Estadística y Geografía y Consejo Nacional de Evaluación de la Política de Desarrollo Social” in Constitución Política de los Estados Unidos Mexicanos Comentada, Coordinated by José Ramón Cossío Díaz, First Edition, Vol. 1, Pgs. 539-547. ISBN 978-849-143-621-8
- 2016. “Autonomía del hecho y autonomía del derecho: Los retos de la reforma política para el CONEVAL” in Nueva ronda de reformas estructurales en México ¿Nuevas políticas sociales? Coordinated by Enrique Valencia Lomelí & Gerardo Ordóñez Barba, Colegio de la Frontera Norte, First Edition, Pgs. 451-462. ISBN 978-607-479-236-2
- 2015. “CONEVAL como órgano autónomo en los hechos” in Revista de Administración Pública, Organismos Constitucionales Autónomos, Instituto Nacional de Administración Pública, A.C. No. 138, Vol. L, No. 3, Pgs. 189-204. ISSN 0482-5209
- 2014. “Los desafíos de la reforma constitucional en materia de derechos humanos dentro del espacio de las políticas públicas" in "La Reforma Constitucional en Derechos Humanos: El costo de su Realización Efectiva". Suprema Corte de Justicia de la Nación. First Edition. Mexico, September 2014. Pgs. 159-171. ISBN 978-607-468-714-9
- 2014.“Crecimiento económico, Desigualdad y Pobreza en México" in "El Futuro del Estado social". – Coordinated by Luis F. Aguilar V.& Jorge A. Alatorre, Universidad de Guadalajara, Centro Universitario de Ciencias Económicas Administrativas. Instituto de Investigación en Políticas Públicas y de Gobierno. Edit. Porrúa. México, 2014. Pgs. 75-97. ISBN 978-607-401-860-8
- 2014.“Medición Multidimensional de la pobreza en México" in El Trimestre Económico – Vol. LXXXI(1), January–March 2014 – No. 321. By: Gonzalo Hernández L., María del Rosario, Cárdenas Elizalde, Fernando Alberto Cortés, Cáceres, Agustín Escobar Latapí, Salomón Nahmad, Sitton, John Scott Andretta, Graciela Teruel, Belismelis and Ricardo Aparicio Jiménez. ISSN 0041-3011. 2014
- 2013. “Construyendo un Sistema de Evaluación del Desempeño para el Desarrollo Social" in Monitoreo, Evaluación y Gestión por Resultados. Aprendizaje y Cooperación Sur-Sur para la Innovación: El Papel de los Actores Subnacionales. Claudia Maldonado Trujillo y Cristina Galíndez Hernández (editors). Regional Centers for Learning on Evaluation and Results – (CLEAR) & El Centro de Investigación y Docencia Económica (CIDE). Pgs. 61-68. ISBN 978-607-7843-55-9. 2013
- 2013. “Mercado laboral, desempleo y acceso a los alimentos" in Revista IBERO, Hambre, pobreza y derecho a la alimentación. Coauthors: Paloma Villagómez O., Pedro Hernández López y Ricardo Aparicio J. Mexico, 2013. No. 27 – Pgs. 4-8. 2013
- 2013. “El Desarrollo Económico en México" in Estudios – Filosofía, Historia, Letras - ITAM – Fall 2013 - No. 106 – Pgs. 99-140. ISSN 0185-6383
- 2013. “Pobreza y Empleo" in Contaduría Pública. Instituto Mexicano de Contadores Públicos. September 2013 – Pgs. 14-17.
- 2013. “Medición de la Pobreza en México. Pobreza y Desigualdad social: retos para la reconfiguración de la política social" in Pobreza y desigualdad social. Retos para la Configuración de la política social. Leticia Cano Soriano – Coordinator - UNAM-Escuela Nacional de Trabajo Social. Pgs. 249-274. Gonzalo Hernández Licona, Ricardo Aparicio, Carlos Mora y Nayeli Salgado. ISBN 978-849969678-2 / ISBN 978-607024671-5
- 2012.“Hechos" in Política Social – Coordinated by Luis Reygadas - 01 - Los retos del Distrito Federal. Escuela de Administración Pública del Distrito Federal – EAPDF – Pgs. 79-92. ISBN 978-607-8228-20-1 Política Social. ISBN 978-607-8228-19-5 Obra Completa
- 2012. “Construyendo un sistema de Evaluación y Monitoreo para el Desarrollo Social" in Élite y Democracia. Revista de Ciencia Política y Comunicación. La Democracia Después de Julio. Pgs. 29-34. Year 2 / No. 3 / Weekly edition.
- 2012. “Obesidad en México: Recomendaciones para una política de Estado" Editors: Dr. Juan Rivera Dommarco, Mauricio Hernández, Carlos Aguilar, Felipe Vadillo y Ciro Murayama. ISBN 978-607-02-3861-1 – UNAM –Mexico, November 2012 – Pgs. 145-164
- 2012. “Construyendo un Sistema de Evaluación del Desempeño para el Desarrollo Social". By Gonzalo Hernández Licona, Thania de la Garza Navarrete y Edgar Martínez Mendoza. In: Ópticas Diversas de la Evaluación del Desempeño en México. (Coordinators: Gabriela Rangel F. y Carlos Menéndez G.). Fundar, Centro de Análisis e Investigación CEDRSSA, Centro de Estudios para el Desarrollo Rural y Sustentable y la Soberanía Alimentaria, LXI Legislatura de la Cámara de Diputados. August 2012. - Pgs. 41-65.
- 2012. “Coneval experience in evaluating interventions for indigenous population in México" By: Gonzalo Hernández, Thania de la Garza, Fernanda Paredes and Brenda Valdez –(Coneval). In: Evaluation for equitable development results. In partnership with: Coneval, IDEAS, IDRC, PNUD, et al. - Pgs. 244-257. 2012
- 2010.“The Role of Evaluation in Mexico: Achievements, Challenges, and Opportunities" in Improving the Quality of Public Expenditure through the use of Performance information in México. The World Bank Group and the Mexican Secretaría de Hacienda y Crédito Público (Ministry of Finance, SHCP). Washington D. C., 2010. 2010
- 2006. “Desarrollo Social en México: Situación actual y retos" with Gustavo Merino & Erika Rascón. In: Medición del Desarrollo Humano en México, Coordinated by Luis Felipe López Calva & Miguel Székely. Fondo de Cultura Económica. Chapter VIII. – Pgs. 373-411.
- 2002. “Empleo y Regulación Laboral en México" Memorias 2001 - IBERGOP- Mexico Editors: A. Ortega, C. A. Martínez, Garza, R. Lecuona - Editorial Porrúa, 2002.
- 2002. “Educación superior y presión social" in Revista Este País –No. 140 – Nov. 2002. Pgs. 53-55. 2002
- 2001. “Políticas para promover una ampliación de la Cobertura de los sistemas de pensiones: el caso de México" Santiago de Chile – Naciones Unidas – CEPAL, Unidad de Estudios Especiales ISBN 92-1-321777-3. 2001
- 2000. “Informalidad, Una Vez Más" in Revista El Mercado de Valores - Year LX, Pgs. 38-47, Cruz Aguayo, Yyannu. - Nacional Financiera, August, 2000
- 2000. “El Empleo en México en el Siglo XXI" El Cotidiano, No. 100, Pgs. 117-128. Ed. Universidad Autónoma Metropolitana & Friedrich Ebert Stiftung, 2000
- 2000. “Pobreza: El Propósito Pendiente" in Revista Expansión, 1999.
- 1997. “Oferta Laboral Familiar y Desempleo en México: Los Efectos de la Pobreza" in Trimestre Económico, Vol. LXIV (4), No. 256. Oct.-Dic, 1997
- 1997. “El efecto de la pobreza en los hogares con la tasa de participación, horas laborales y empleo en México". El Economista Mexicano. Nueva Época. Vol. 1 – No. 2.
