= Queso flameado =

Dish of hot melted cheese and spicy chorizo

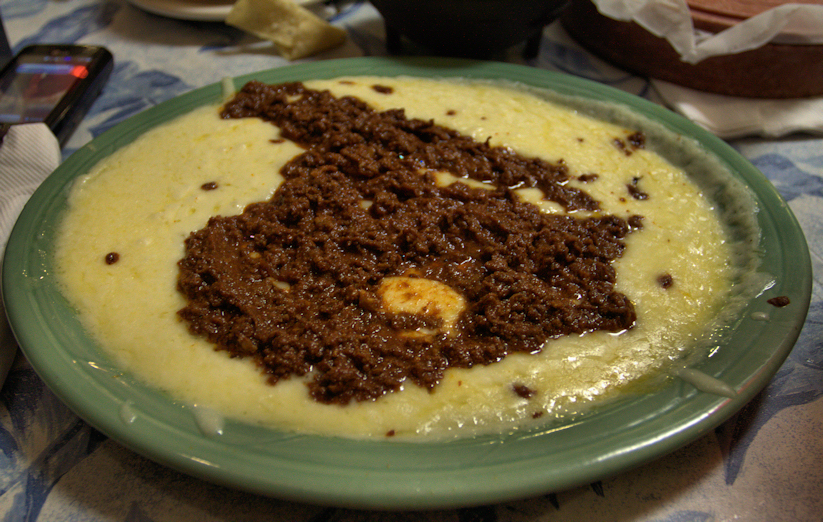
- Queso flameado made with Oaxaca cheese and chorizo
- Course: Hors d'oeuvre
- Place of origin: Mexico
- Serving temperature: Flambé
- Main ingredients: Cheese, spicy chorizo

Queso flameado (lit. 'flamed cheese'), also known as queso fundido or choriqueso, is a dish of hot melted cheese and spicy chorizo that is often served flambé. Often compared to cheese fondue, it is a party dish; it is popular at cookouts and in restaurants as an appetizer. Almost unique in Mexican cuisine, in the cuisine of the United States this dish has been widely adapted and is considered a native dish in El Paso. In Mexico, it occurs in restaurants more often in the north. Typical main ingredients are melted cheese and a characteristic meat sauce of loose fresh chorizo, tomato, onion, chile and spices. It is served in a small, shallow casserole or other ceramic or metal heat-proof baking dish. The cheese and sauce are prepared separately, and combined just before serving. This may be done at the table, especially if finished with a flambé: high alcohol liquor is poured on the cheese and ignited, and as it burns the server folds in the sauce. If not flambéed, the mixture may be quickly broiled. Either way, the finished dish is presented while it is still bubbling hot, and it is spooned onto small soft tortillas for individual servings.

Queso flameado is said to originate in the borderlands of northern Mexico and the southwestern United States, as a campfire dish.

In Tex-Mex restaurants, this dish is sometimes confused or conflated with chili con queso, a cheese sauce served with tortilla chips for dipping. The term queso fundido also refers to processed cheese and is defined as such in the Spanish version of Codex Alimentarius.

== Variations ==
Both the cheese and the meat sauce are prepared just before serving, and are served hot. Oaxaca cheese and Chihuahua cheese are popular, but other melting cheeses (cheeses such as whole milk mozzarella, which remain stringy when melted) may be used. Some consider stringy cheese to be an essential part of this dish, but if this quality is not desired then a fresh farmer's cheese or goat cheese is a good alternative. If fresh chorizo is not available, pieces of dry chorizo or another sausage may be used. Common additions are strips of roasted chiles and sautéed mushrooms. For the flambé, popular liquors include rum, brandy, and tequila. Either of the two most common types of tortilla in Mexico and Texas, corn or wheat, may be used. In Puerto Vallarta, flour tortillas usually are served only with certain dishes, including queso flameado, corn tortillas otherwise being the norm.

== See also ==
- List of cheese dishes
- List of hors d'oeuvre
- Chile con queso
