= Chihuahua cheese =

Mexican soft white cheese

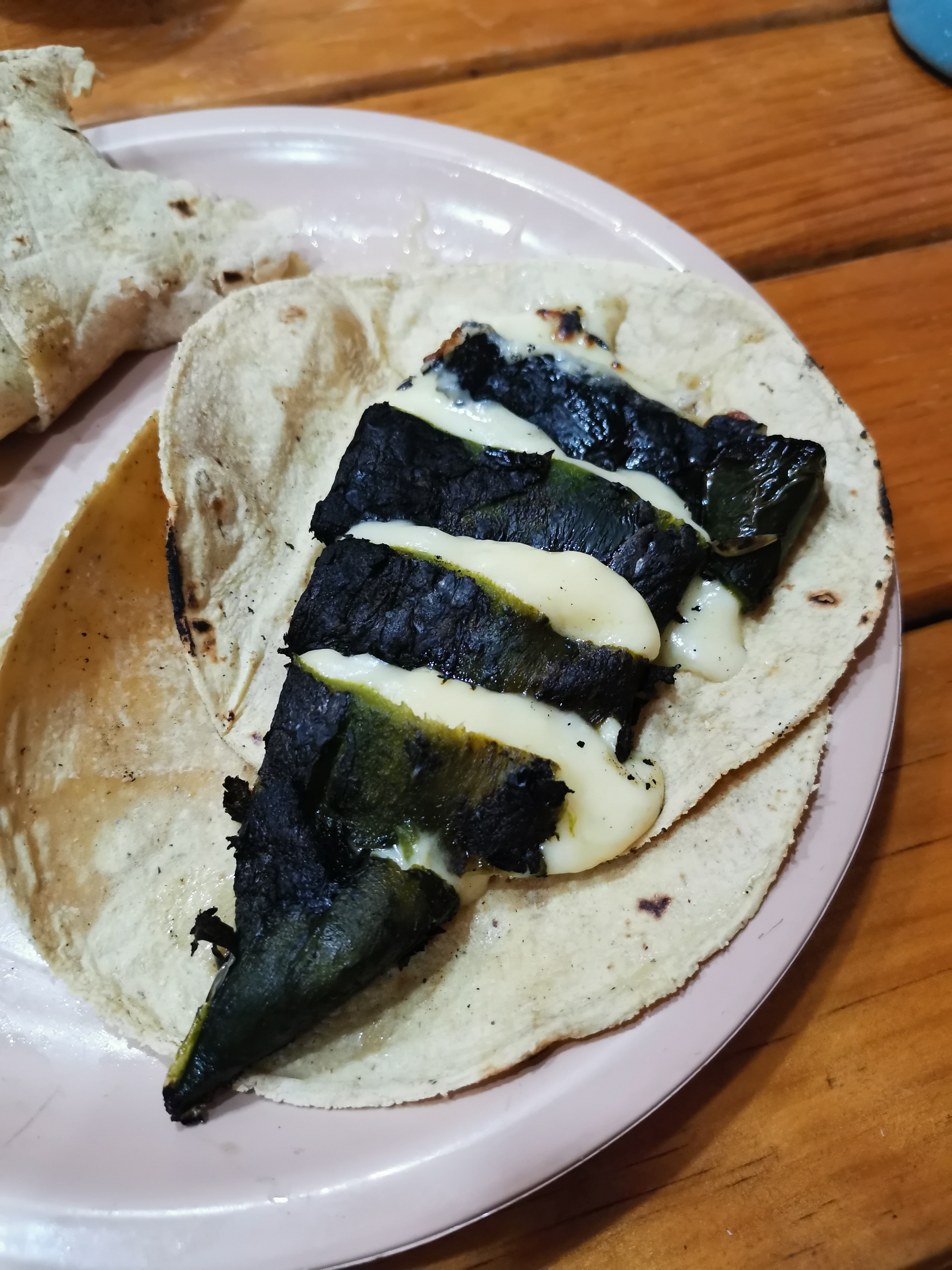
A taco from the state of Puebla, Mexico, made with a poblano chile stuffed with queso Chihuahua

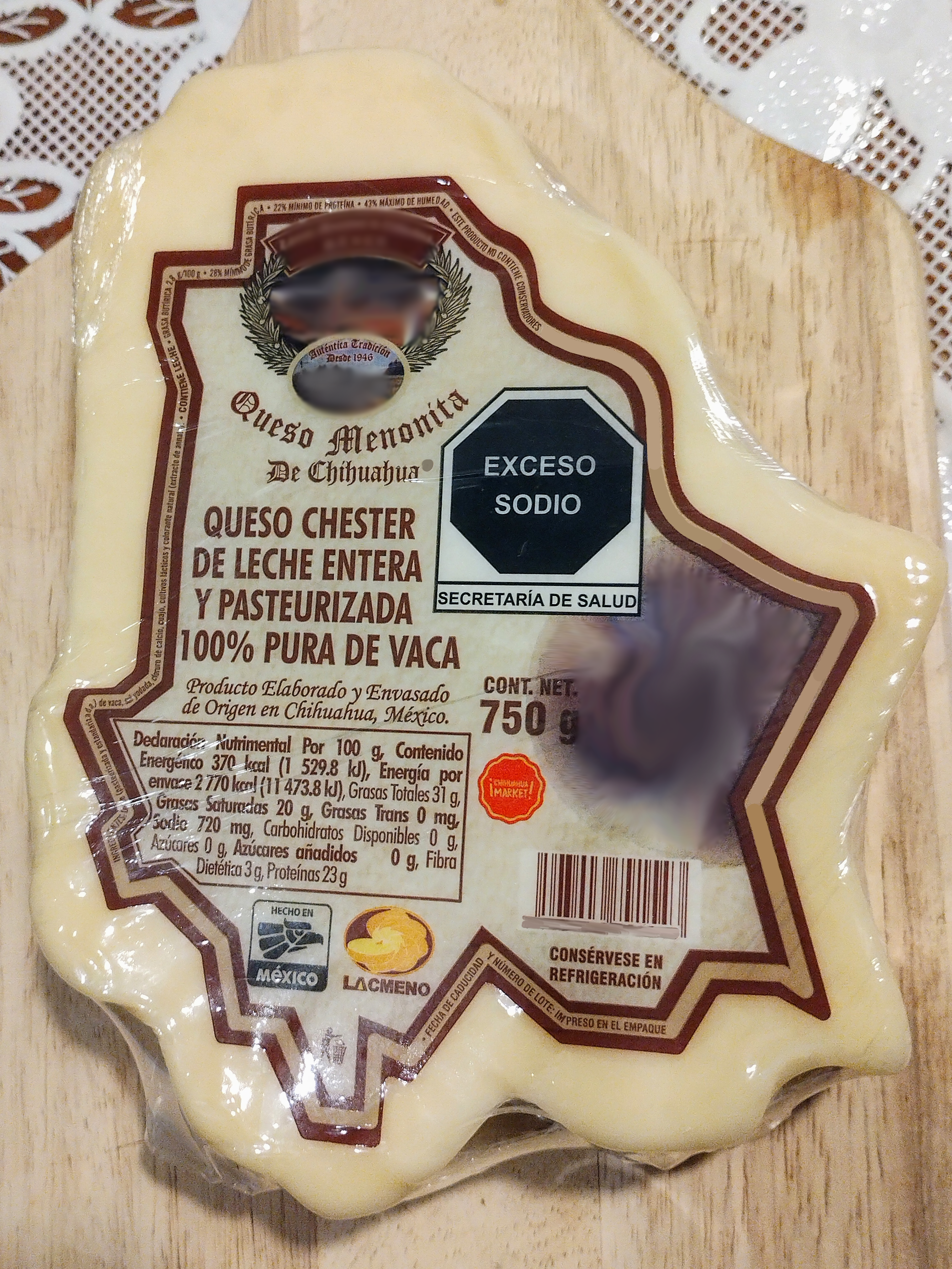
Mennonite Cheese, chester style from Chihuahua. This cheese is cut and packaged in the shape of the state of Chihuahua.

Chihuahu cheese (Spanish: queso Chihuahua) is a soft white cheese available in braids, balls or rounds and originates in the Mexican state of Chihuahua. In Chihuahua and neighboring states, it is called Mennonite cheese (queso menonita), after the Mennonite communities of Northern Mexico that first produced it, while elsewhere it is called queso Chihuahua. This cheese is now made by both Mennonites and non-Mennonites throughout the state and is popular all over the country.

Chihuahua cheese is good for melting and is similar to a mild white Cheddar or Monterey Jack. It may be used in queso fundido (fondue style melted cheese), choriqueso, quesadillas, chilaquiles, chili con queso, or sauces. The physicochemical specifications for Chihuahua cheese are 45% maximum moisture, 26% minimum butterfat, 22% minimum milk protein, 55% minimum total solids, 6.5% maximum ash, and a pH of 5.0 to 5.5.

== See also ==
- List of cheeses
- Cheeses of Mexico
