= Alejandro Licona =

Mexican dramatist (born 1953)

Alejandro Licona Padilla (born 1953) is a Mexican dramatist who has won awards for his stage plays and screenplays.

== Biography ==
Alejandro Licona was born April 12, 1953, in Mexico City. He studied chemical engineering at the National Polytechnic Institute in Mexico City. In 1972, he participated in a playwriting workshop in a center run by Mexican writer Emilio Carballido. In 1976, he began to produce a wide variety of dramatic works, including scripts for film and television. That year, his screenplay La torre acribillada ("The Riddled Tower," with Dante del Castillo), was awarded an honorary mention in the national screenplay competition organized by the Mexican Writers' Guild, SOGEM.

In 1980, his screenplay, Máquina ("Machine") was filmed in Los Angeles, California, and went on to win the Juan Ruiz de Alarcón prize. Four years later, he was awarded a theater fellowship for the Centro Mexicano de Escritores ("Mexican Writers' Center"). In 1987, he assumed charge of the playwriting workshop of the National Polytechnic Institute, and in 1990, was admitted as professor of television screenwriting in the school of the Mexican Writers' Guild. He also taught screenwriting at the Ibero-American University. In 1995, he headed the dramatic workshop for Mexican multimedia conglomerate Televisa's Centro de Capacitación de Escritores ("writer training center").

Among his better known works, Guau, vidas de perros ("Bow-wow, the Lives of Dogs") has been performed 75 times under the direction of Juan Silva López. In 1997, as Licona celebrated his 25th year as a writer, his play El espectáculo macarenazo ("The Macarena-Nose Show," co-written with Tomás Urtusástegui) received a 200th performance in the Foro Coyoacanense.

== Works ==
Alejandro Licona has written 52 plays, adapting some for television and film. He has also written screenplays and worked as a writing teacher in various centers. His works tend towards comedy and social criticism.

Licona told the magazine Escritores del cine mexicano sonoro that apart from the financial benefits of writing for film and television,

...to tell a story basically with images and to give a message (...) in some way, one feels privileged to be able to write for the cinema (...); it's a writer's need; As Cortázar says, "To cast out the demon that one carries inside and pass him to the rest, to see what they do with him.

=== Theater ===
- El diablo en el jardín ("The Devil in the Garden," 1976).
- Guau, vidas de perros ("Bow-wow, the Lives of Dogs," 1982).
- Abuelita de Batman ("For Sure!").
- Huélum o cómo pasar matemáticas sin problemas ("Hooray, or How to Pass Mathematics without Difficulties," 1981).
- Raptóla, violóla y matóla ("He Nabbed Her, He Raped Her, He Killed Her," 1987).
- El espectáculo Macarenazo ("The Macarena-Nose Show," 1996).
- Máquina ("Machine," 1980).
- La mujer que trajo la lluvia ("The Woman who Brought the Rain").
- Las tres heridas ("The three wounds").

=== Film and television ===
- Que no quede huella ("To Leave No Trace", for the series)
- Entre vivos y muertos ("Between the Living and the Dead") for Mexico City Channel 13 (1994).
- La torre acribillada ("The Riddled Tower," 1976).
- La amenaza roja ("The Red Menace," 1985) for Mexico City Channel 11.
- ¿Qué nos pasa? ("What's Happening to Us?" 1986) for Mexico City Channel 2.
- Algunas historias de la serie Hora marcada ("Some stories from the series The Appointed Hour," 1989) for Mexico City Channel 2.
- Dos nacos en el planeta de las mujeres ("Two Bumpkins on the Planet of Women," 1989).
- Un macho en la casa de citas / La coronela y sus muchachas ("A Macho in the House of Ill Repute" / "The Colonel and his Women," 1989).
- Mátenme porque me muero / La noche de los insepultos ("Kill Me Because I'm Dying" / "The Night of the Unburied," 1989).
- Perseguida / Testigo de un crimen ("Followed" / "Witness to a Crime," 1989).
- Un macho en el hotel / El hotelito de los horrores ("A Macho in the Hotel" / "The Little Hotel of Horrors," 1990).
- Mujer de cabaret / Night club ("1990).
- Peló gallo ("He Got Away," 1990).
- Cazafantasmas a la mexicana ("Mexican Ghostbusters," 1991).
- Santo santón ("Holy Guru," 1993).
- Morir por tu amor ("To Die for Your Love," 1994).

=== Other works ===
- Teatro mexicano del siglo XX.1900-1988. ("Mexican Theater of the Century, 1900-1988," anthology of theatrical works, 1989).

== Prizes and awards ==
- 1976. Honorary Mention for the screenplay, La torre acribillada, National Screenplay Competition, Mexican Writers' Guild
- 1980. Premio Juan Ruiz de Alarcón for Máquina.
- 1976. Premio Punto de Partida for El diablo en el jardín.
- 1982. Premio de teatro infantil Concepción Sada for Guau, vidas de perros
- 1994. Premio Nacional Caridad Bravo Adams for best crime teleplay for Que no quede huella.
- 2002. Premio Ricardo López Aranda de Santander (Spain) for La santa perdida ("The Lost Saint").
