= Oaxaca cheese =

White, semihard cheese originating in Mexico

Quesillo
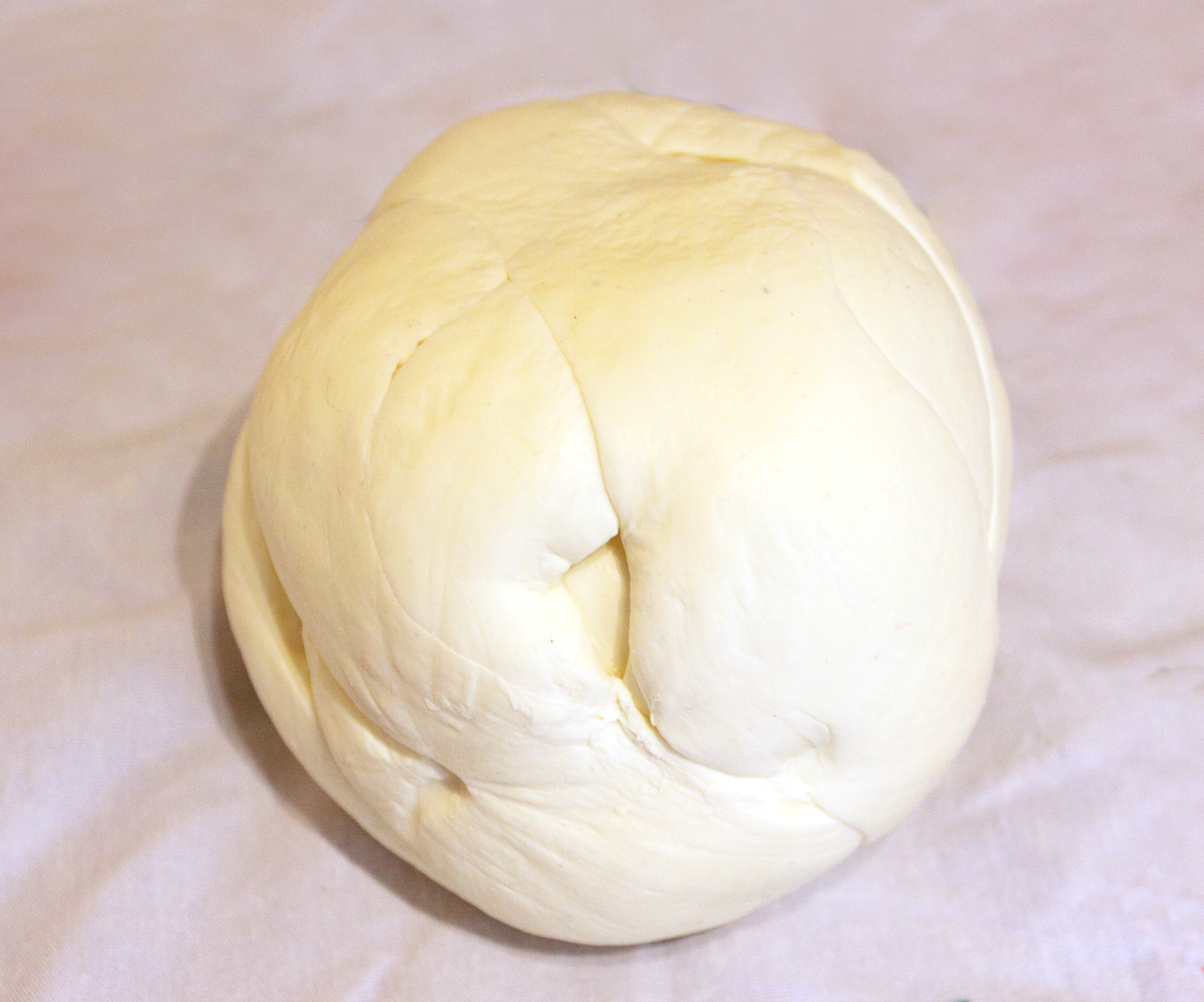
- Other names: Quesillo de Oaxaca, Queso de hebra
- Country of origin: Mexico
- Region: Oaxaca
- Source of milk: Cow
- Texture: Semi-hard
- Named after: Oaxaca, cord

Oaxaca cheese (Spanish: queso Oaxaca) (/wəˈhɑːkə/ wə-HAH-kə), also known as quesillo and queso de hebra, is a white, semihard, low-fat cheese that originated in Mexico. It is similar to unaged Monterey Jack, but with a texture similar to mozzarella or string cheese.

== History ==
It is named after the state of Oaxaca in southern Mexico, where it was first made. The string cheese process was brought to Mexico by the Dominican friars who settled in Oaxaca. The cheese is available in several different shapes.

The name "quesillo" is the one given by the region where it originated, then it adopted the name of Oaxaca cheese; the only real difference lies in where this dairy product was produced or where it is purchased, but in essence it is the same thing. However, there are those who believe that it would be better to keep the name Oaxaca cheese because this denomination would make this state famous outside the country and, like manchego cheese, gouda cheese or others, the name would be associated with a specific place.

== Production ==
Just under 30,000 metric tonnes of Oaxaca cheese were produced in Mexico in 2020. Much of it comes from the state of Oaxaca, located in southern Mexico.

The production process is complicated and involves stretching the cheese into long ribbons and rolling it up like a ball of yarn using the pasta filata process. Another cheese made with this method is mozzarella curd, though the final process for Oaxaca cheese bears a closer resemblance to braided cheeses.

== Uses ==
Oaxaca cheese is used widely in Mexican cuisine, especially in quesadillas and empanadas, where the queso Oaxaca is melted and other ingredients, such as huitlacoche and squash flowers, are added to the filling. It is particularly associated with the tlayuda, a typical Oaxacan antojito.

== Outside Mexico ==
Oaxaca cheese is often confused with asadero (queso asadero), a cheese produced in the northern state of Chihuahua. They are similar in texture, but they are produced with different methods, making Oaxaca cheese moister.

In Costa Rica, it is known as queso palmito. The name is due to the similarity to the stringy consistency of heart of palm (palmito), and it is produced in the San Carlos and Zarcero cantons of Alajuela Province.

In Nicaragua, Honduras, Colombia and El Salvador, the cheese is known as quesillo.

== Gallery ==
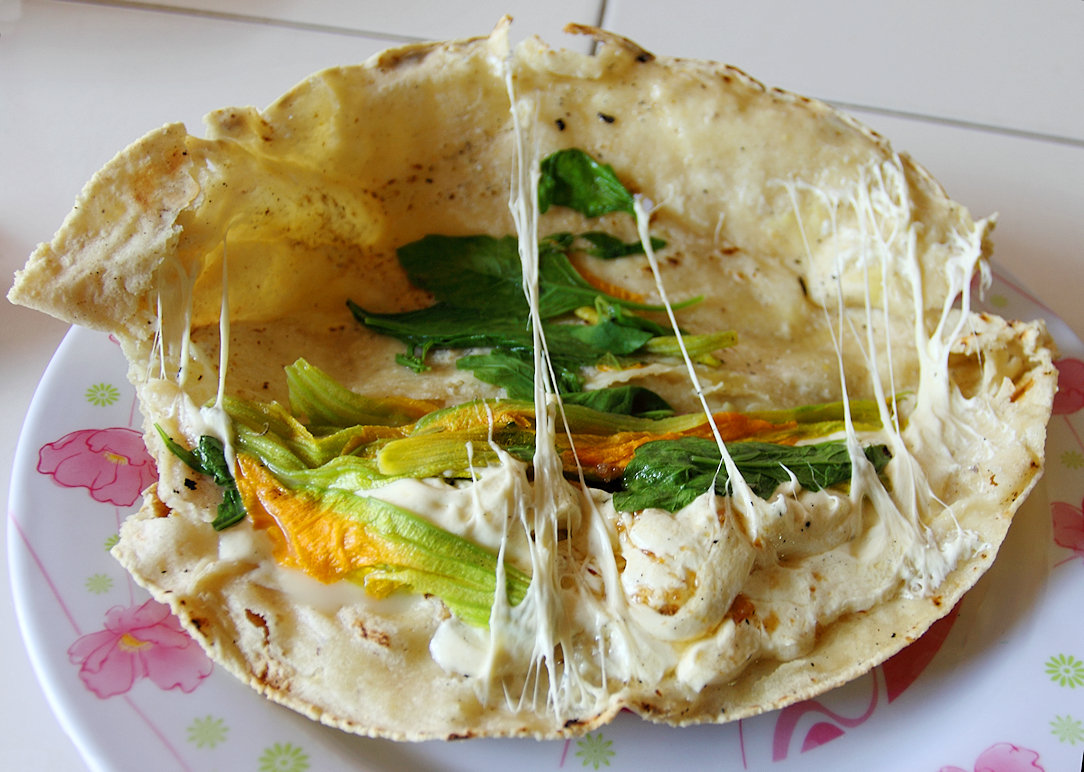
A quesadilla with queso Oaxaca, flor de calabaza, and epazote

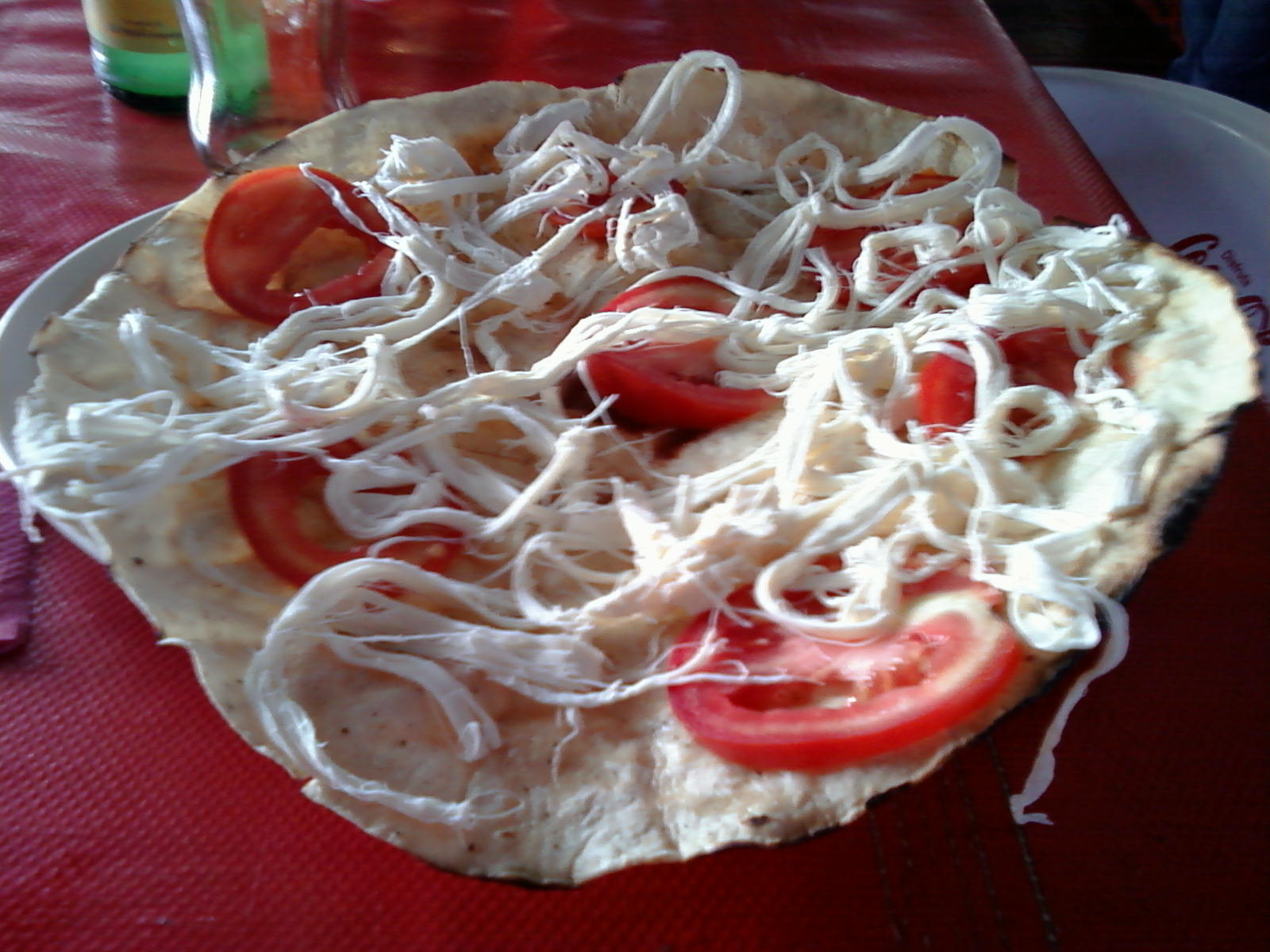
A tlayuda topped with tomato and strings of quesillo Oaxaca

== See also ==
- Cheeses of Mexico
- List of stretch-curd cheeses
- Oaxacan cuisine
