= Romano cheese =

Term for a class of cheeses

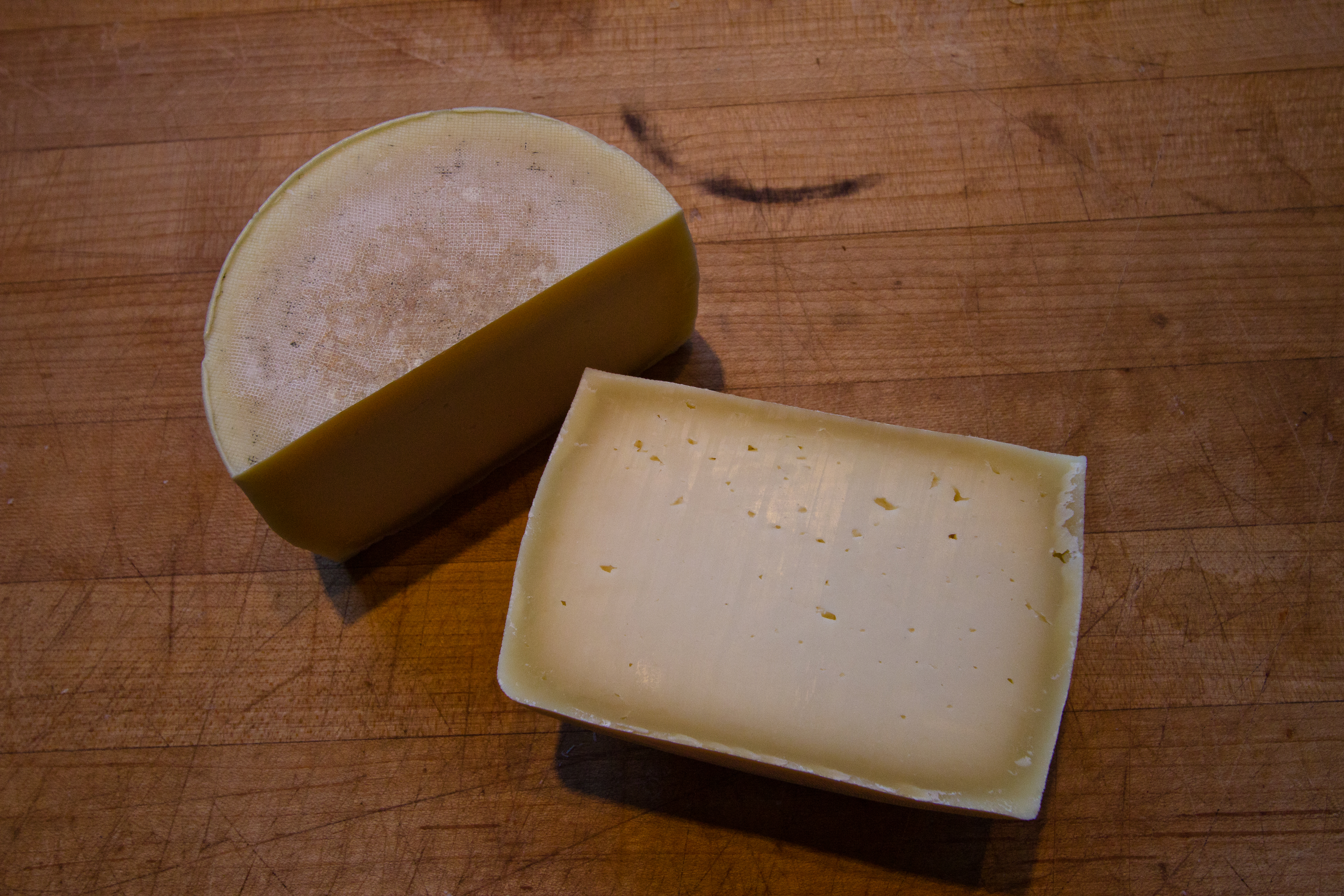
Block of three-month-old Romano cheese

Romano cheese is a term used in the United States and Canada for a class of hard, salty cheese suitable primarily for grating. It is the American imitation of pecorino romano, from which the name is derived; despite the name "Romano", it should not be confused with genuine pecorino romano, which is an Italian product recognized and protected by the laws of the European Union, although United States law allows Romano produced entirely from sheep's milk to be called pecorino romano.

Per U.S. Food and Drug Administration regulations, Romano cheese can be made from cow, goat, and/or sheep's milk. It must contain less than 34% water and at least 38% milkfat. Cream, skim milk and/or dry milk and water can be added or removed to create the correct level of milkfat. The milk used can be bleached with benzoyl peroxide or a mixture of benzoyl peroxide with potassium alum, calcium sulfate, and magnesium carbonate but, in that case, vitamin A must be added after treatment. Safe artificial blue or green coloring may be added only to counter any yellow coloring of the milk. Rennet does not need to be used and any "suitable milk-clotting enzyme that produces equivalent curd formation" may be used.

== Nutritional facts ==
One ounce (28 grams) of Romano cheese contains:

Energy	110 calories
Fat	8 g
Sodium	406 mg
Protein	9 g

== See also ==
- List of cheeses
- Parmesan
