= Chile con queso =

Side dish of melted processed cheese and chili peppers

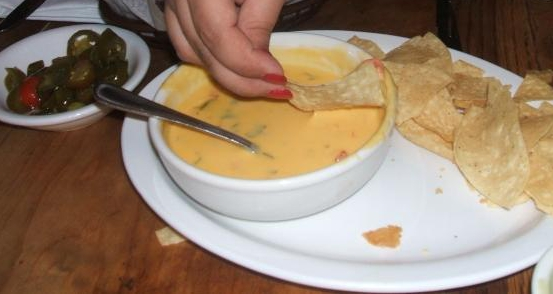
- A bowl of chile con queso served with tortilla chips as an appetizer in a Tex-Mex restaurant
- Type: Dip
- Course: Appetizer or side dish
- Place of origin: Mexico; United States
- Region or state: Chihuahua
- Main ingredients: Cheese (often Velveeta or other processed cheese, Monterey Jack or cream cheese), cream, chili peppers
- Ingredients generally used: Onion, paprika
- Variations: con carne (add ground chorizo sausage ex.)

Chile con queso (lit. 'chili with cheese'), sometimes simply called queso, is an appetizer or side dish of melted processed cheese and chili peppers, typically served in American Tex-Mex restaurants as a dip for tortilla chips. It can also be added to other dishes such as tacos.

== Background ==
Chile con queso (also spelled chili con queso) is a part of 20th century Tex-Mex and Southwestern cuisine. Chile con queso is probably a derivative of queso flameado from the northern Mexican state of Chihuahua.

Chile con queso is predominantly found on the menus of Tex-Mex restaurants in the southwest and western United States.

=== Ingredients ===
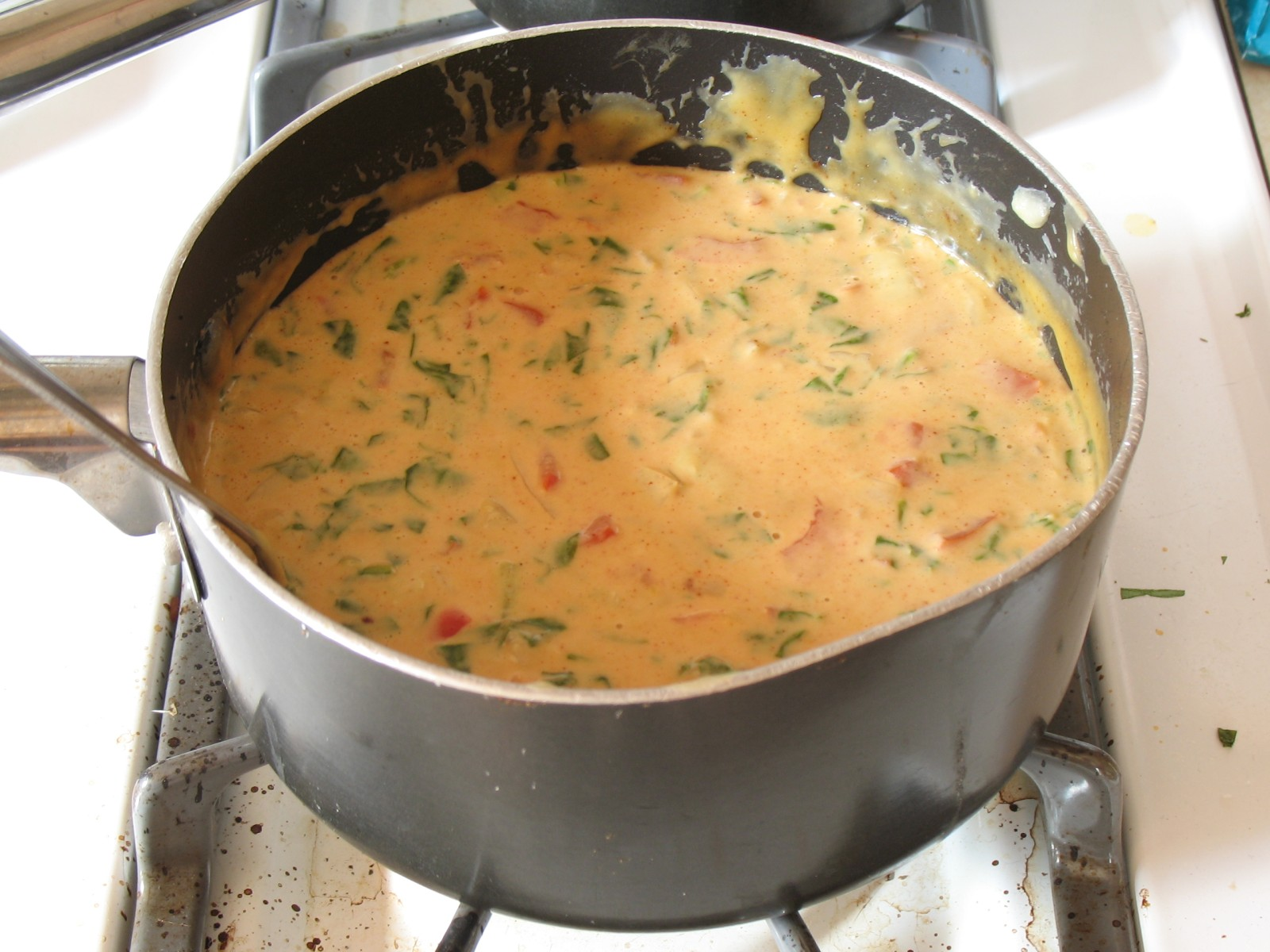
Preparing queso. This recipe include fresh chopped onion, tomatillo, tomatoes, and chili peppers as well as variety of seasoning

Chile con queso is a smooth, creamy sauce, used for dipping, that is made from a blend of melted cheeses (often American cheese, Velveeta or another processed cheese, Monterey Jack or cream cheese), cream, and chili peppers. Many restaurants serve chile con queso with such added ingredients as pico de gallo, black beans, guacamole, and ground beef or pork.

=== Serving ===
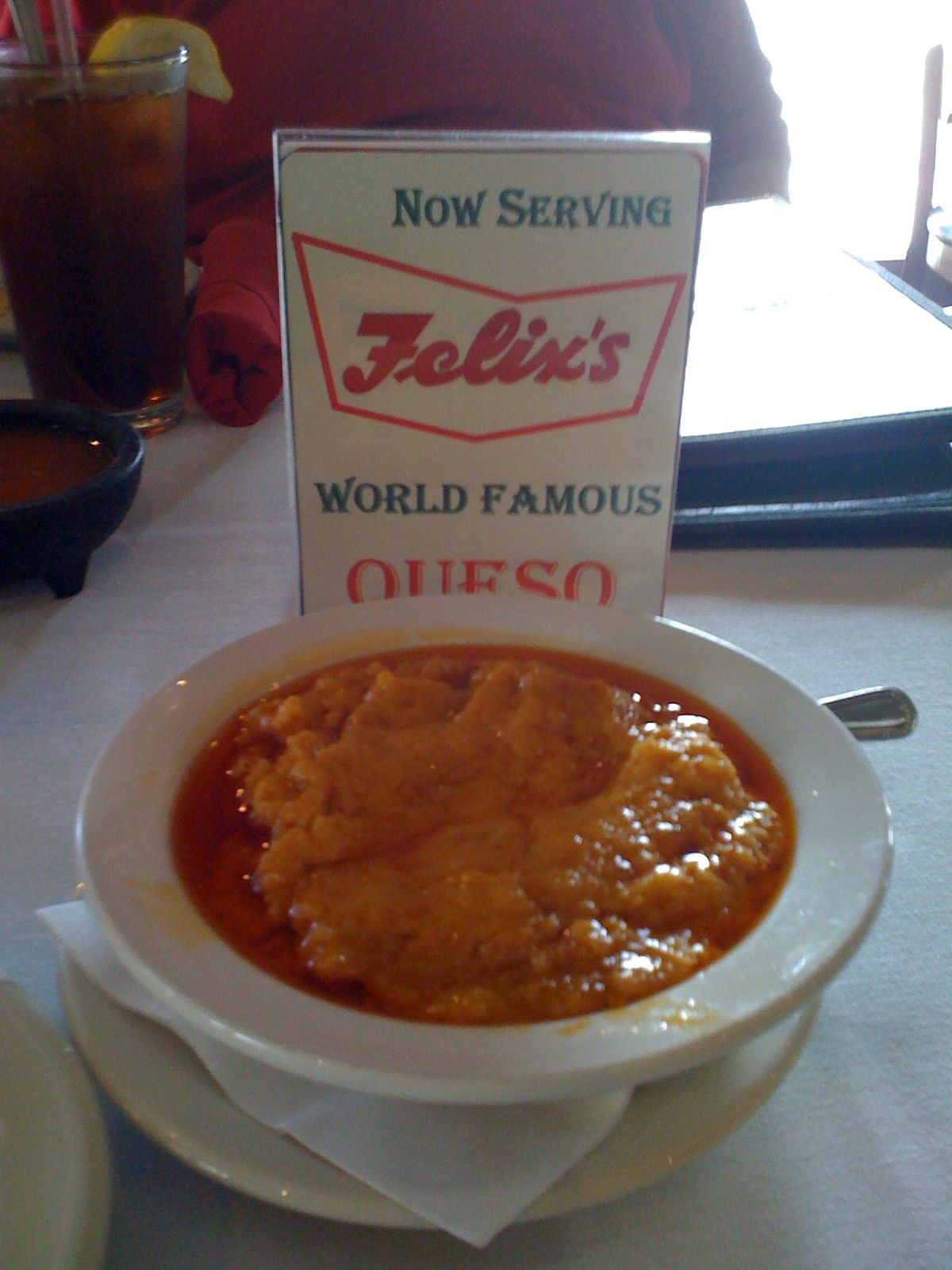
Chile con queso served in a restaurant

Chile con queso is a warm dish, heated to a desired temperature. Chile con queso can be eaten with tortillas, tortilla chips, or pita chips which are thicker than regular tortilla chips. It can also be used as a condiment on fajitas, tacos, enchiladas, migas, quesadillas or any other Tex-Mex dish.

While Tex-Mex restaurants often offer chips and salsa free of charge, queso is usually offered for an additional charge. It can be made with various cheeses. Usually it is white or yellow in color.

== See also ==
- List of dips
- List of hors d'oeuvre
- Tex-Mex cuisine
- Chili powder – food spice made from chili peppers
