= Flurgönder =

German specialty meat

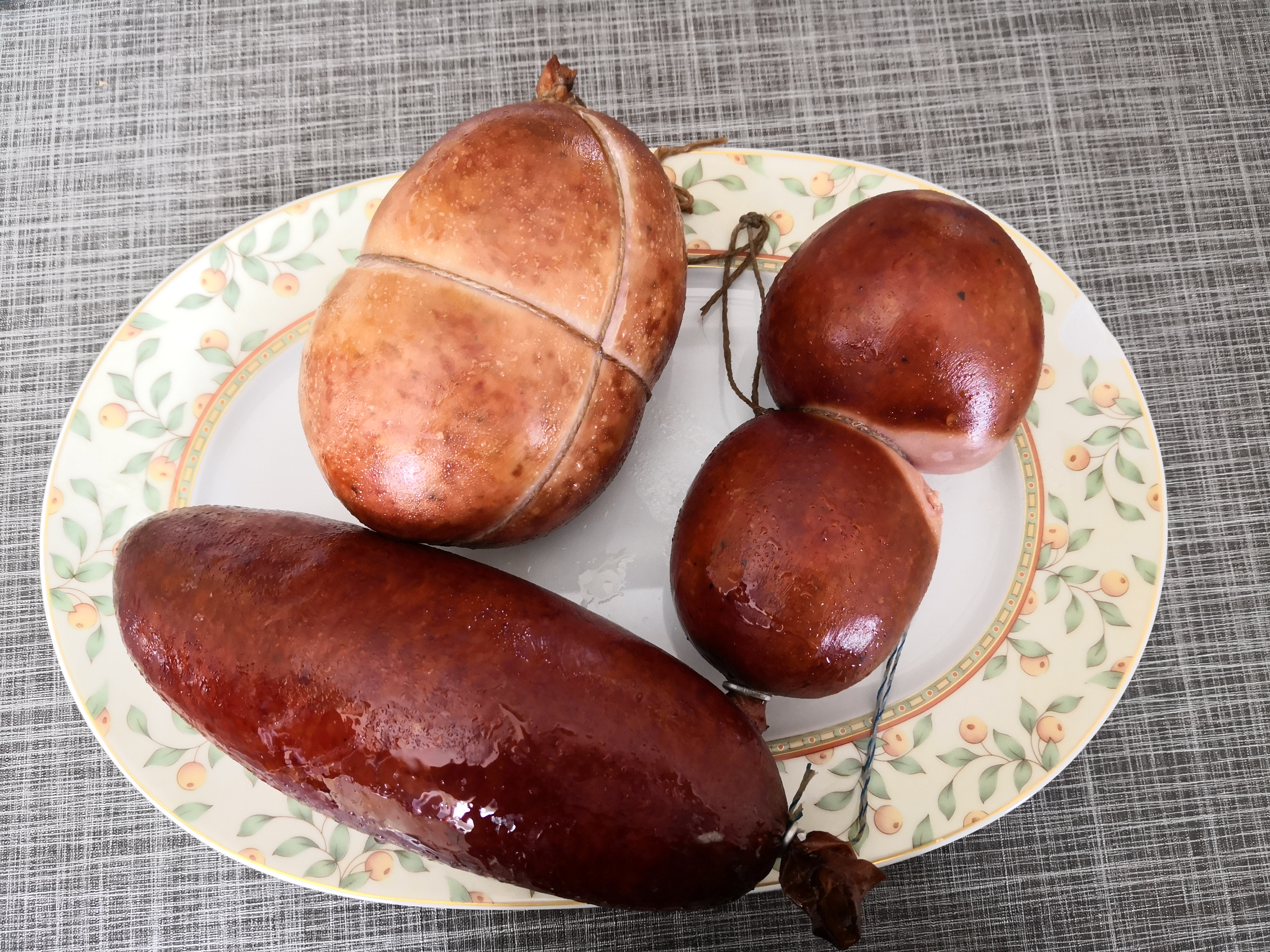

Flurgönder is a specialty meat in the Fulda country of Hesse, Germany. It is a raw, smoked brawn, served warm with noodles. It is called "Flurgönder" because it is served in particular in the Catholic region around Fulda and the Rhön after the processions through "field and meadow" (German: "Feld und Flur") for Ascension and Corpus Christi. "Gönder" is a vernacular term for the regional and seasonal specialties, each butcher has his own recipe. It is prepared in hot but not boiling water, ten minutes for every cm of diameter, and is served together with noodles, usually with bread crumbs, a green salad or apple sauce.

== Literature ==
- Spatzeklöß un Flurgönder: was im Fuldaer Land gut schmeckt, Bettina Kempf; Jürgen H. Krenzer. Parzeller, Fulda 1997

== See also ==
- List of smoked foods
