= Smoked salt =

Aromatic edible salt product

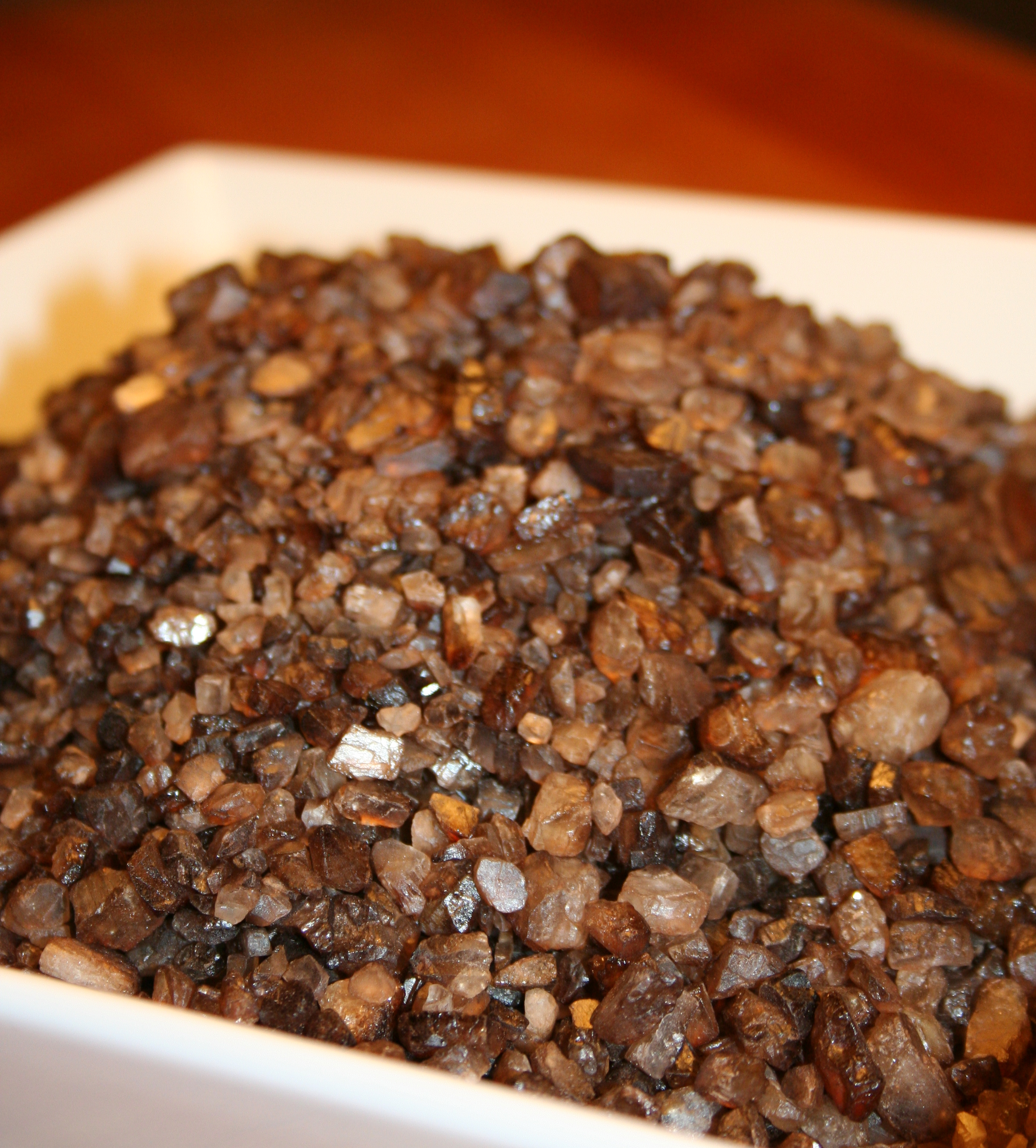
Mesquite smoked salt

Smoked salt is an aromatic salt smoked with any number of select bark free woods for up to 14 days. The kind of wood used for smoking impacts the flavor, which can range from subtle to bold or even sweet. The most common choices are alder, apple wood, hickory, mesquite, and oak. Infused smoked salts like smoked bacon chipotle sea salt are very popular because of their flavor profiles.

Smoked salt is used to enhance the inherent flavors of a dish, while also imparting a smoky taste. It is suitable for vegetarians, often acting as a replacement for bacon crumbles. Smoked salt differs from smoke-flavored salt, as the latter contains a smoke-flavored additive, and is not classified as a natural salt product.

== See also ==
- List of smoked foods
