= Brânză de coșuleț =

Romanian salty cheese

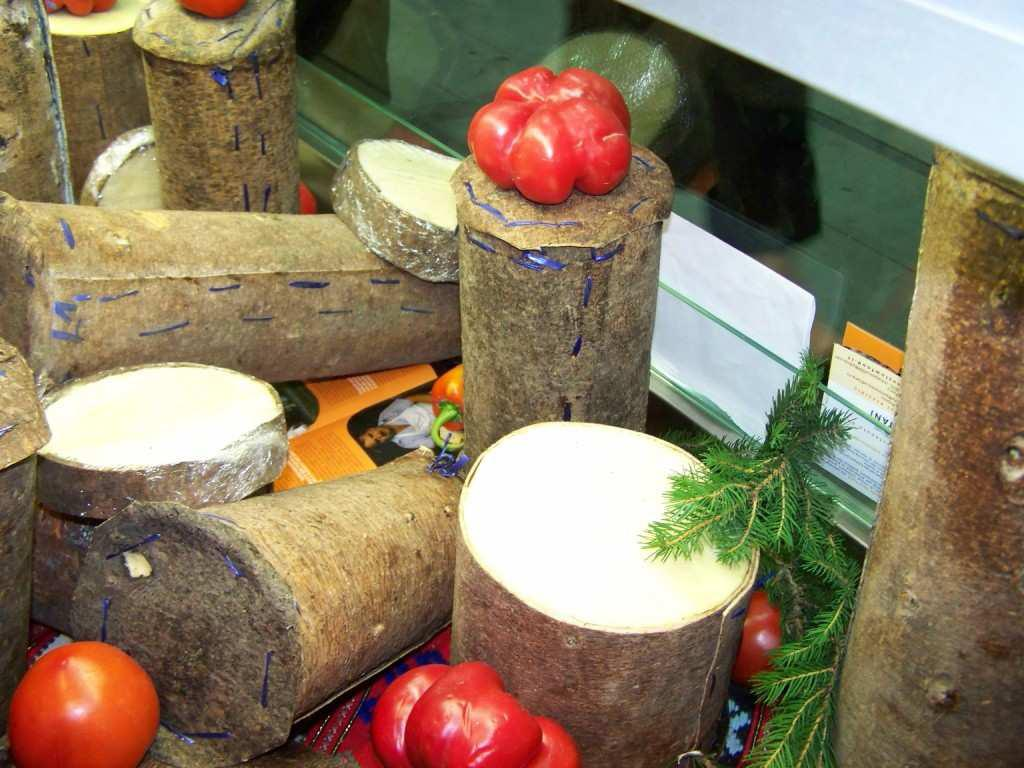
- Country of origin: Romania
- Region, town: Transylvania
- Source of milk: Sheep
- Pasteurised: Traditionally, no
- Texture: Soft
- Weight: 1kg

Brânză de coșuleț is a salty type of cheese, with sheep's-milk cheese from Romania, specific of Transylvania. Brânză de coșuleț has a strong flavour and slightly soft in texture. To obtain it, sweet caș is cut into small pieces, salted and then hand-mixed in a large wooden bowl. The mixture is then stuffed into bellows of fir tree bark, very lightly smoked. The cheese gets a specific pine resin flavour.

== See also ==
- List of smoked foods
