= Sopocka =

Sopocka in Polish cuisine is the name given to a salted (cured) and slightly smoked cut of pork. It is similar to the German kassler.

== See also ==
- List of smoked foods
