= Ahle Wurst =

German pork sausage

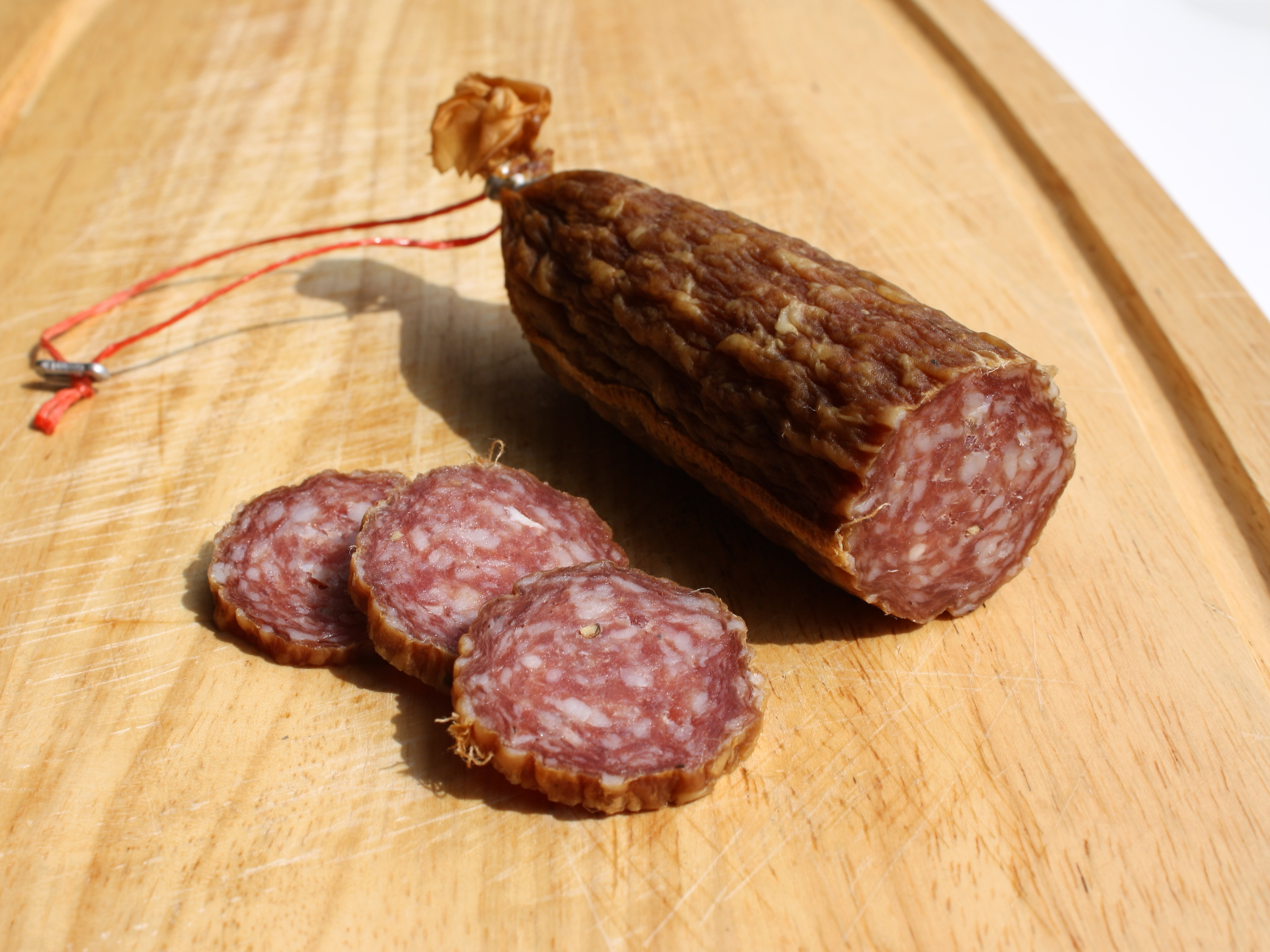
Ahle Wurst

The Ahle Wurst (Ahle Wurscht or Ahle Worscht, also in some areas Rote Wurst - red sausage) is a hard pork sausage made in northern Hesse, Germany. Its name is a dialectal form of alte Wurst – "old sausage". Ahle Wurst has protected geographical Status (g.g.A.) in Germany, the indication is only allowed to be used for sausages that are produced in the area of northern Hesse around its local capital Kassel.

Depending on the shape it is also called "Stracke" if elongated or "Runde" if round.

Ahle Wurst is a sausage made of pork meat and bacon. Seasoned only with salt and pepper, there are regional differences and some butchers add nutmeg, cloves, pepper, sugar, garlic, cumin and rum or brandy.

In traditional manufacturing only heavy pigs are processed fresh (with the meat still warm) and quality cuts of meat produced. The slow maturation at relatively high humidity is the distinguishing mark of the sausage. The sausage can be smoked or made air-dried.

== See also ==
- List of smoked foods
