= Ossenworst =

Dutch sausage

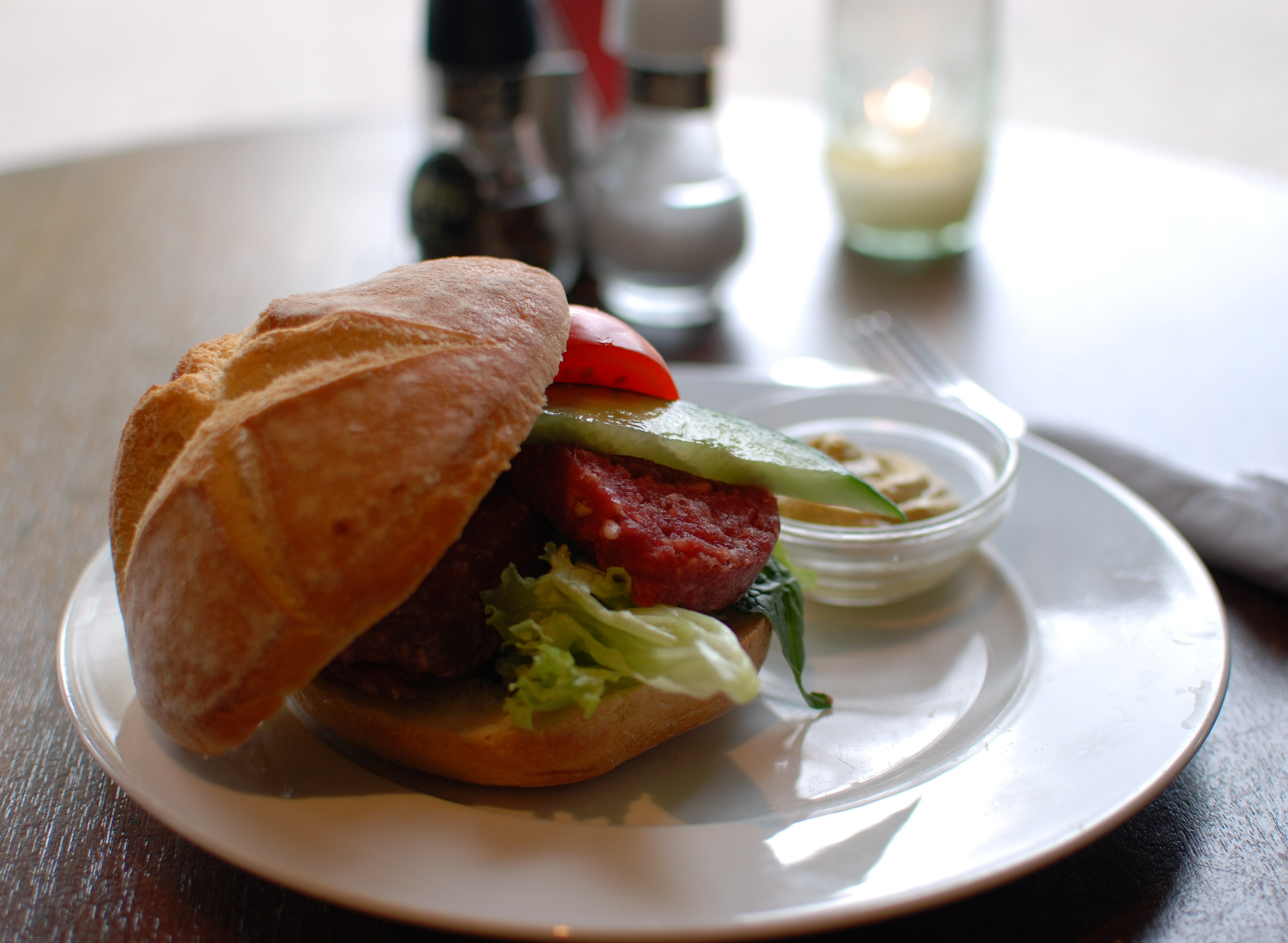
Ossenworst sandwich

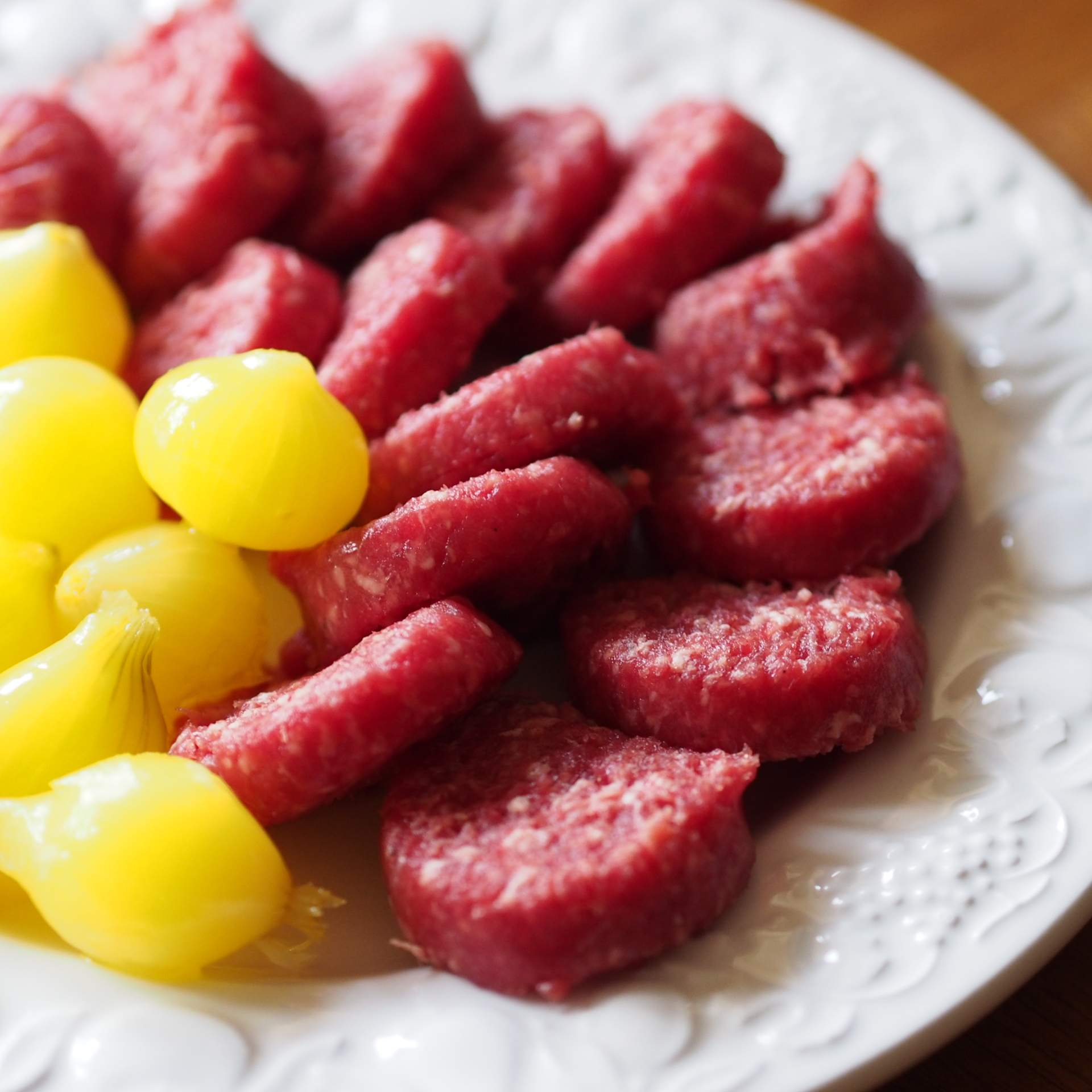
Ossenworst served with Amsterdamse uitjes (onions pickled with turmeric or saffron)

Ossenworst (Dutch pronunciation: [ˈɔsə(ɱ)ˌʋɔrst]; English: ox sausage) is a smoked beef sausage originating in Amsterdam, which was originally made of ox meat.

This specialty has its origins in the seventeenth century, when oxen were imported large-scale from Denmark and Germany. The spices in the sausage, such as pepper, cloves, mace and nutmeg, came from the Dutch East Indies.

Traditionally, aged beef was used for this sausage, that was then smoked at a low temperature such that the meat remained raw. Present-day Amsterdam Ossenworst is made with lean beef, and the sausage is now often neither smoked nor aged.

== See also ==
- List of sausages
- List of smoked foods
