= List of smoked foods =

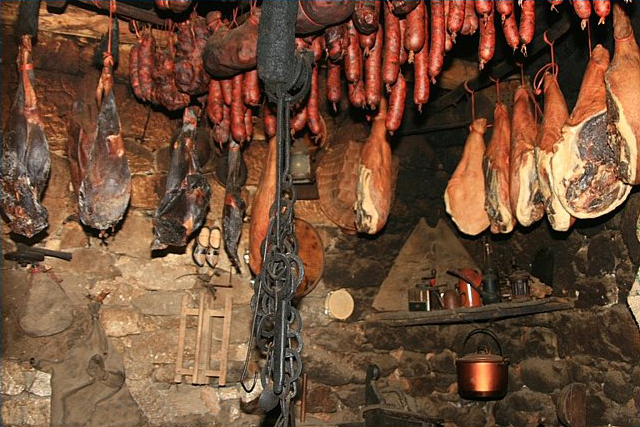
Smoked meats

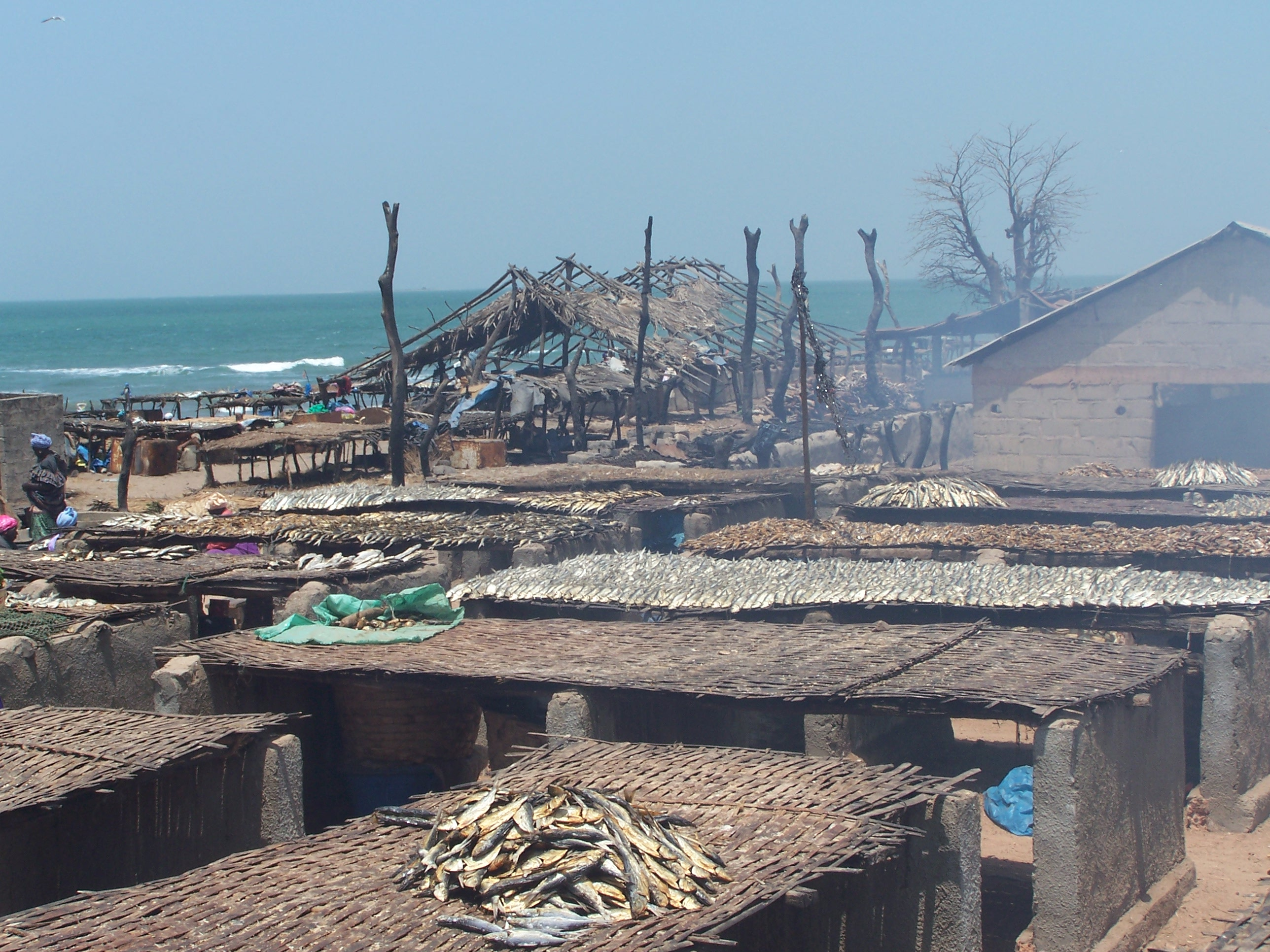
Fish being smoked in Tanji, Gambia

This is a list of smoked foods. Smoking is the process of flavoring, cooking, or preserving food by exposing it to smoke from burning or smoldering material, most often wood. Foods have been smoked by humans throughout history. Meats and fish are the most common smoked foods, though cheeses, vegetables, and ingredients used to make beverages such as whisky, smoked beer, and lapsang souchong tea are also smoked. Smoked beverages are also included in this list.

== Smoked foods ==
=== Beverages ===
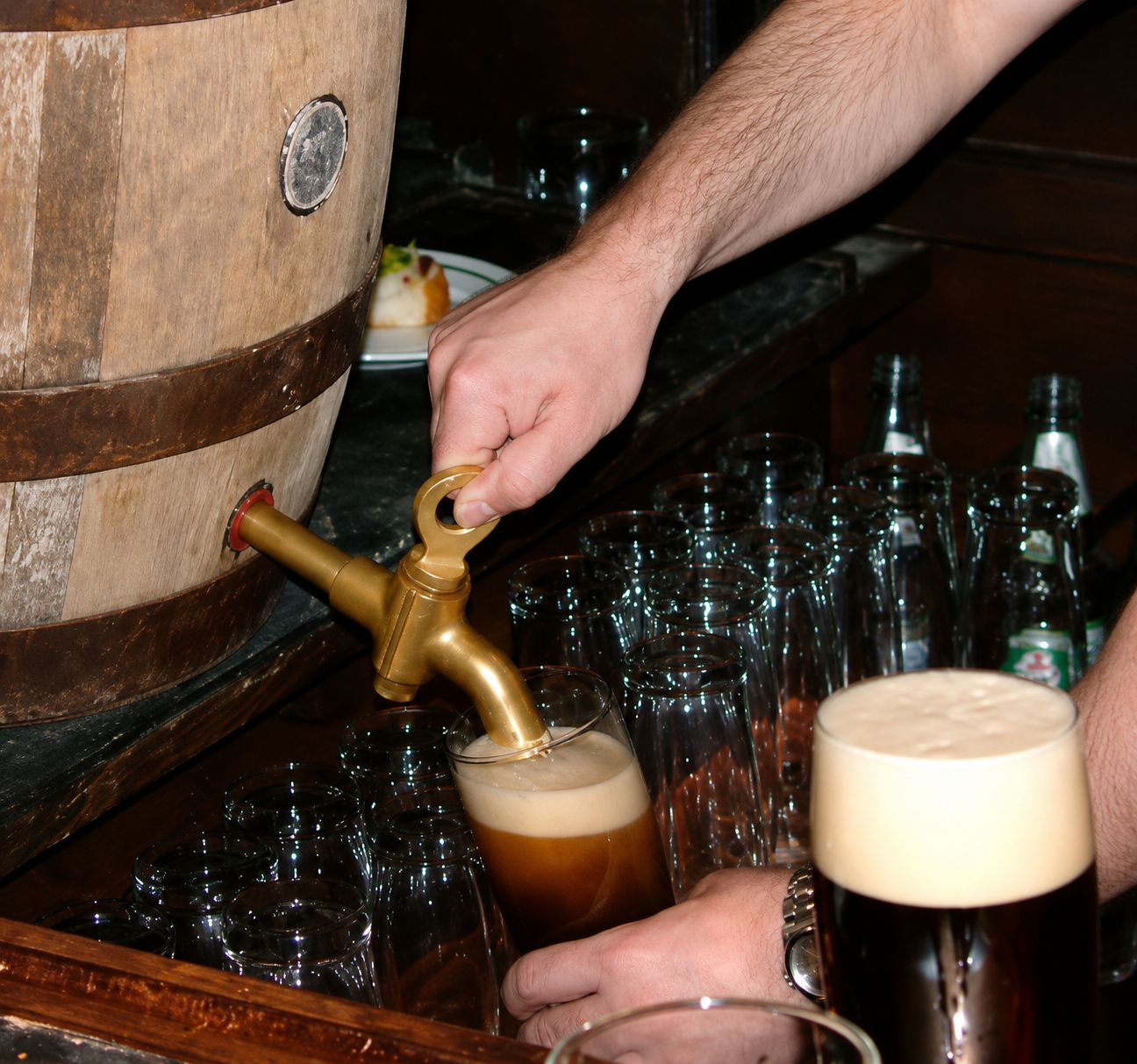
Schlenkerla Rauchbier, a smoked beer, straight from the cask

- Lapsang souchong – a kind of tea.
- Mattha – an Indian buttermilk or yogurt drink that is sometimes smoked.
- Smoked beer – beer with a distinctive smoke flavor imparted by using malted barley dried over an open flame
  - Grätzer.
- Suanmeitang – a Chinese smoked plum drink.
- Scotch Whisky – some scotch is made from grains that have been smoked over a peat fire.
Smoked beverages

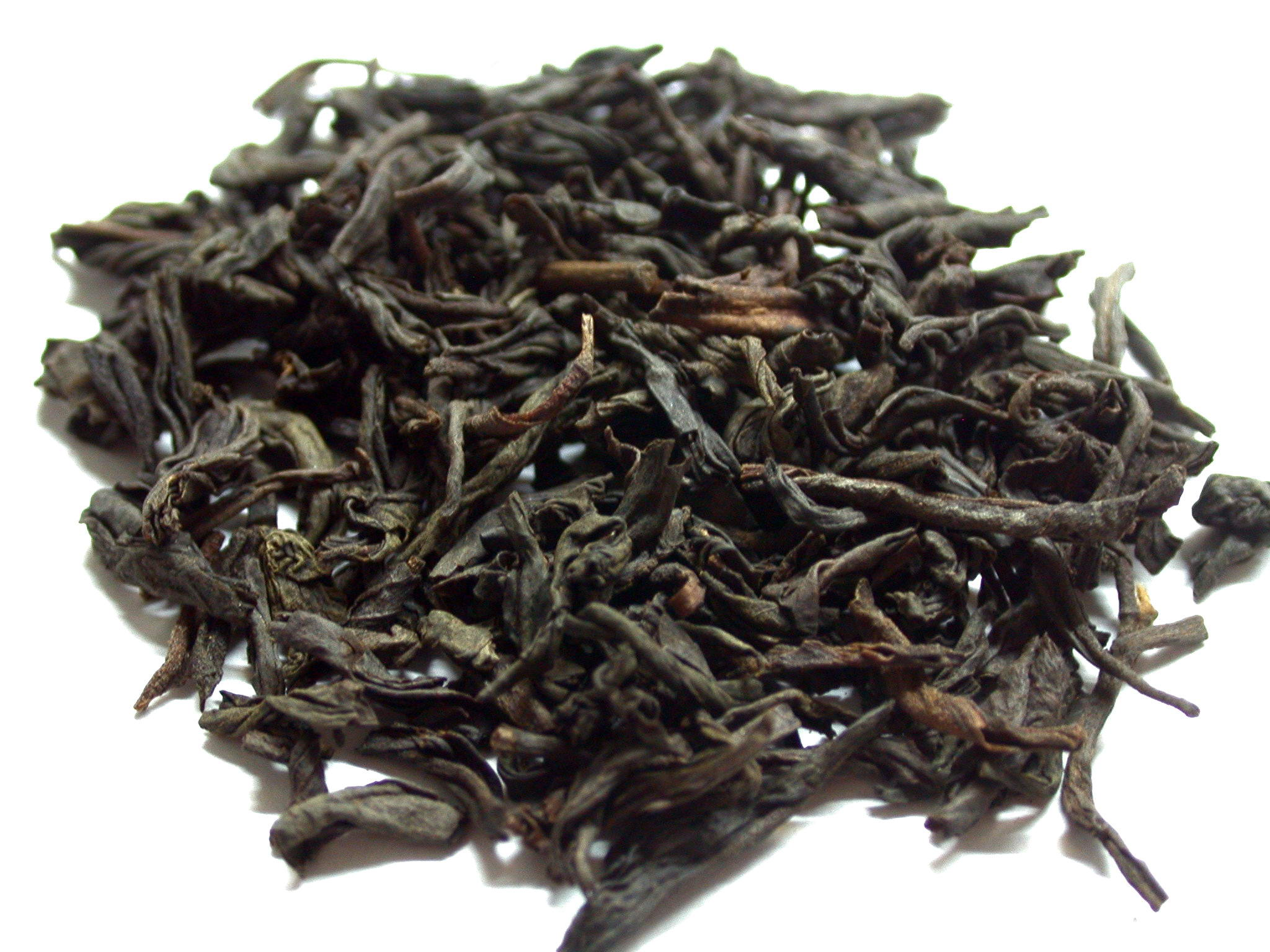
Lapsang souchong tea leaves. Lapsang souchong is sometimes referred to as smoked tea.

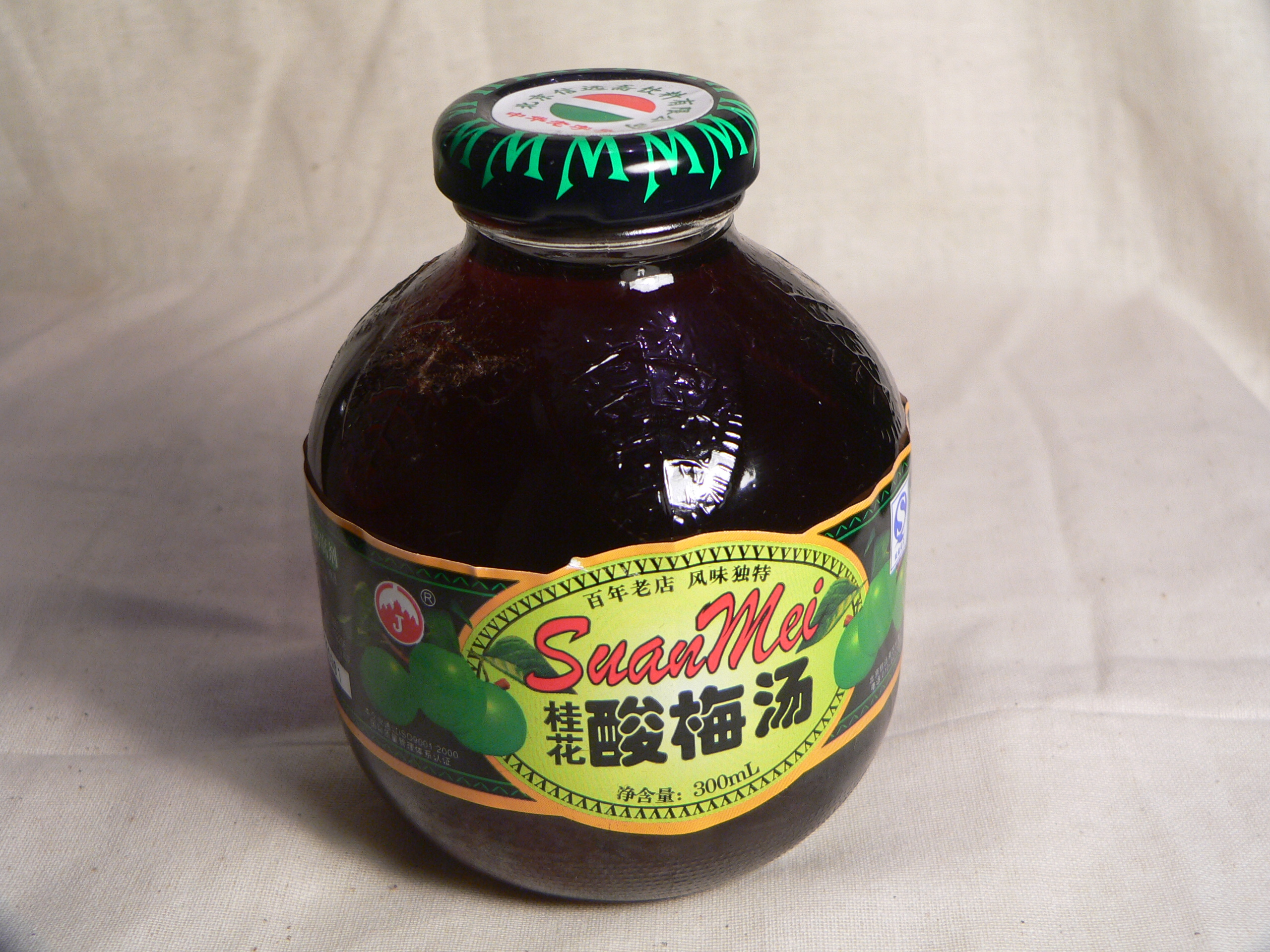
Suanmeitang is a beverage that is prepared with smoked Chinese plums.

=== Cheeses ===
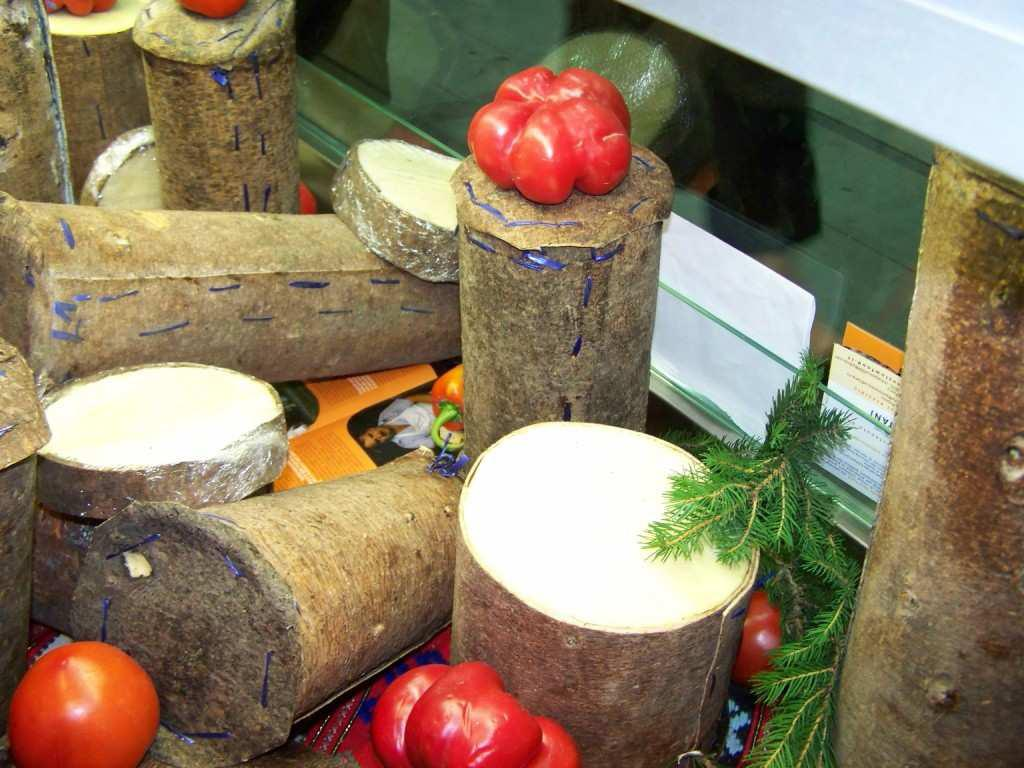
Brânză de coșuleț cheese

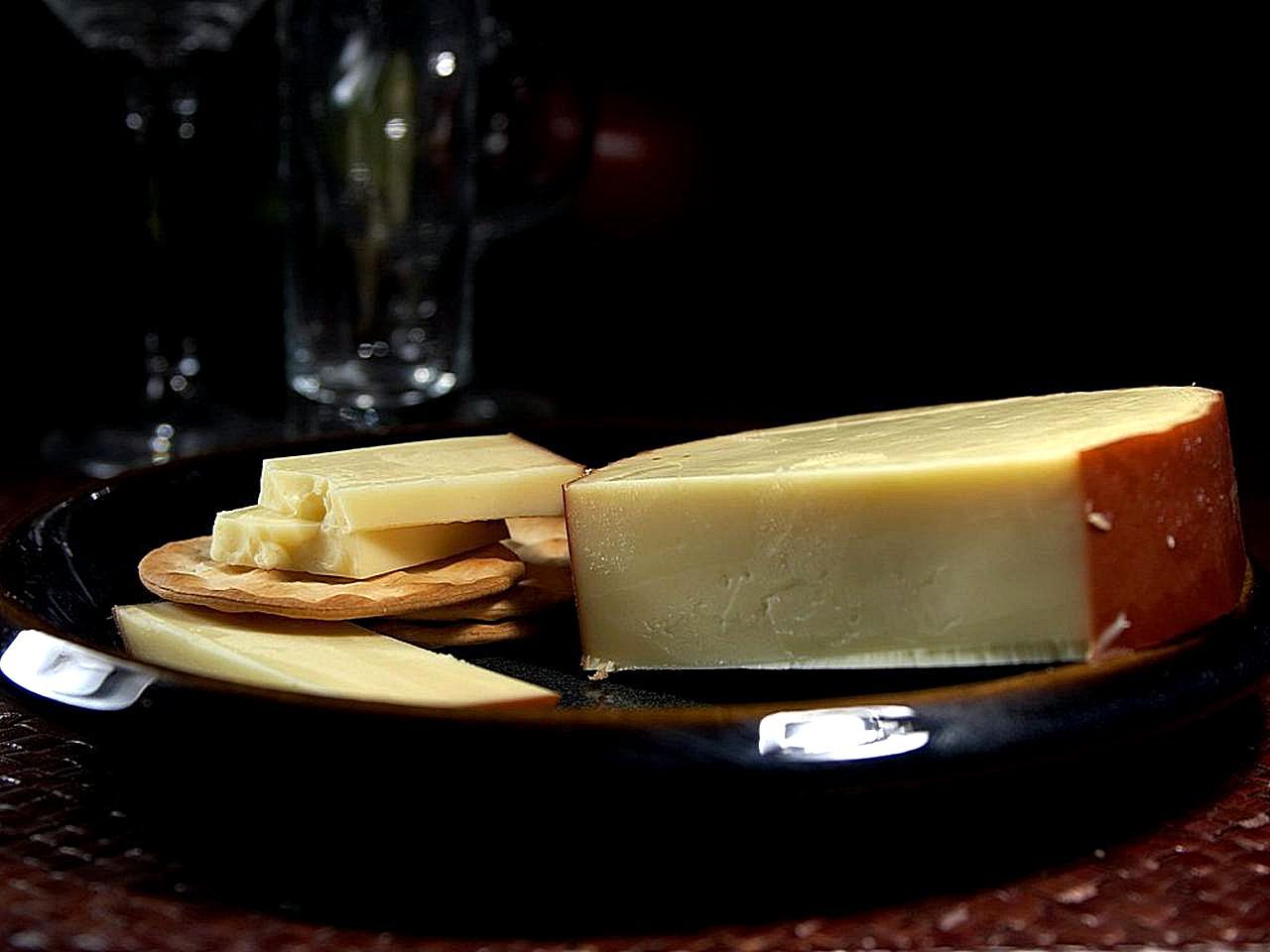
Smoked Gouda cheese

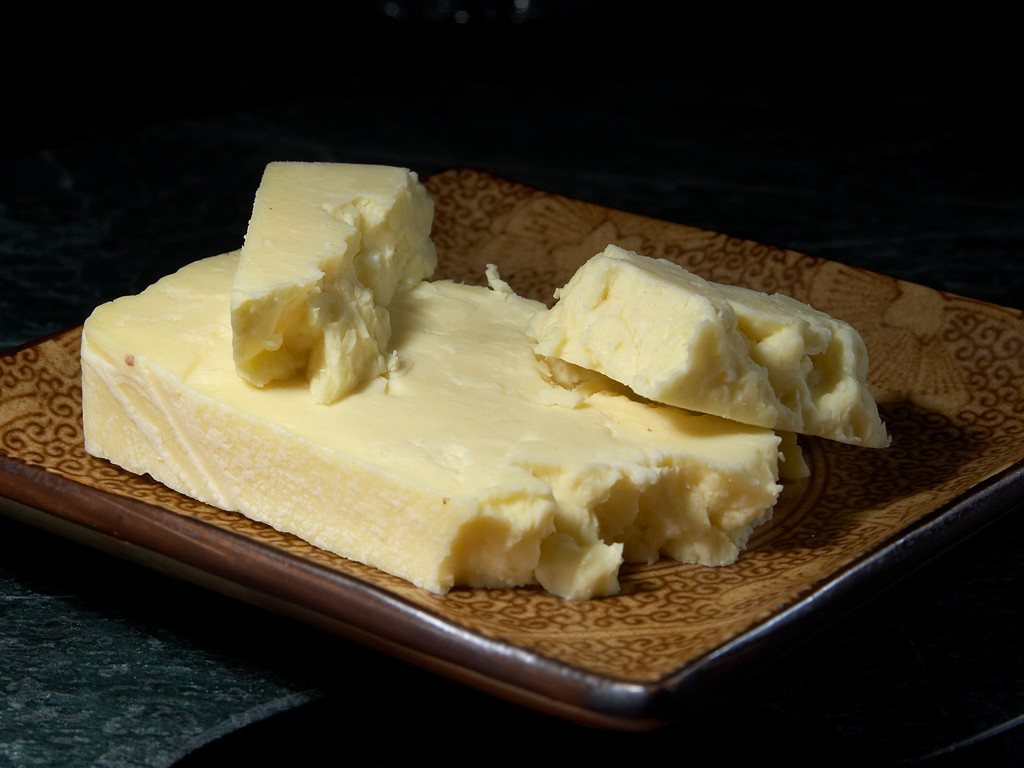
Some varieties of Wensleydale cheese are smoked.

Smoked cheese is any cheese that has been specially treated by smoke-curing. It typically has a yellowish-brown outer pellicle which is a result of this curing process.

- Ardrahan Cheese – company that produces a smoked variety of their Ardrahan cheese.
- Bandel cheese
- Brânză de coșuleț (Romania)
- Chechil
- Cheddar cheese – some versions are smoked
- Circassian smoked cheese
- Corleggy Cheese – company that produces some versions of smoked cheese, such as their Corleggy, Drumlin and Creeny varieties
- Gamonéu cheese
- Gouda cheese
  - Burren Gold
- Gubbeen Farmhouse Cheese
- Idiazabal cheese
- Korbáčik – type of string cheese made from steamed cheese interwoven into fine braids. Common flavors include salty, smoked and garlic.
- Kwaito cheese
- Lincolnshire Poacher cheese
- Metsovone – produced by the Aromanians in Greece, has been a European protected designation of origin since 1996
- Mozzarella – mozzarella affumicata is a term for the smoked variety
- Oscypek – smoked sheep milk cheese, made exclusively in the Tatra Mountains region of Poland
- Oštiepok
- Palmero cheese
- Parenica – traditional Slovak cheese; a semi-firm, non-ripening, semi-fat, steamed and usually smoked cheese, although the non-smoked version is also produced
- Provolone – some versions are smoked
- Pule cheese – reportedly the "world's most expensive cheese" priced at 1,000 Euros per kilogram; a smoked cheese made from the milk of Balkan donkeys from Serbia
- San Simón cheese
- Rauchkäse
- Ricotta
- Rygeost– traditional Danish cheese made from soured buttermilk smoked with straw and stinging nettles
- Scamorza
- Sulguni – traditional Georgian salted smoked cheese
- Tesyn
- Wensleydale cheese – produces Oak Smoked Wensleydale
Smoked cheeses

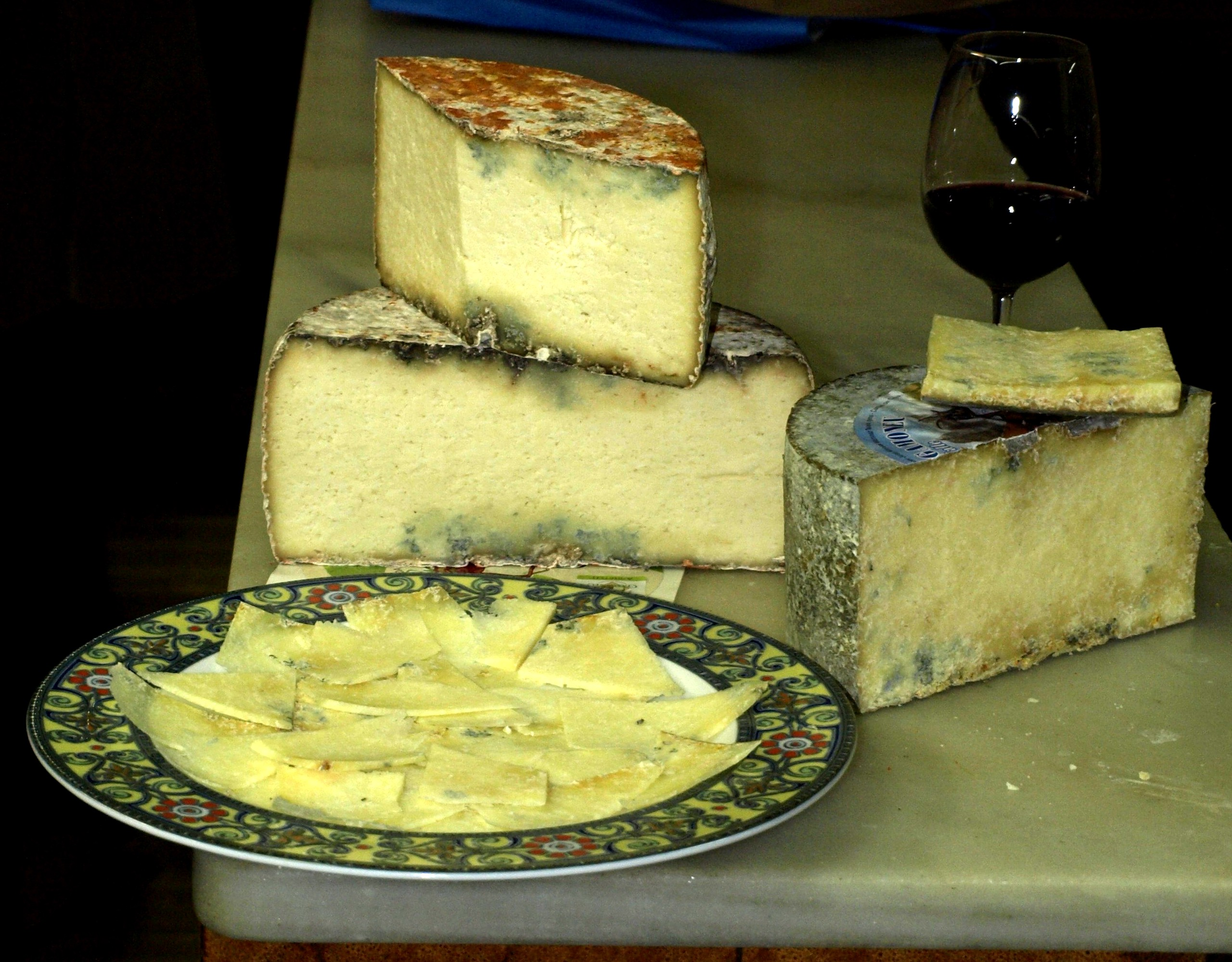
Gamonéu cheese

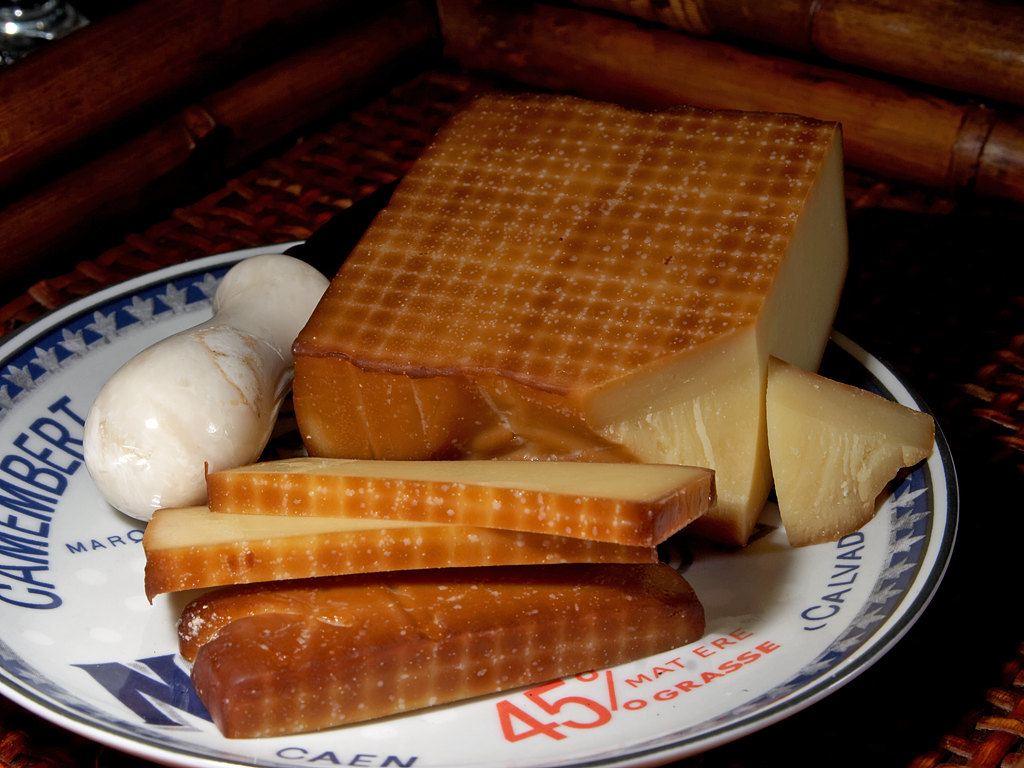
Smoked Gruyère cheese

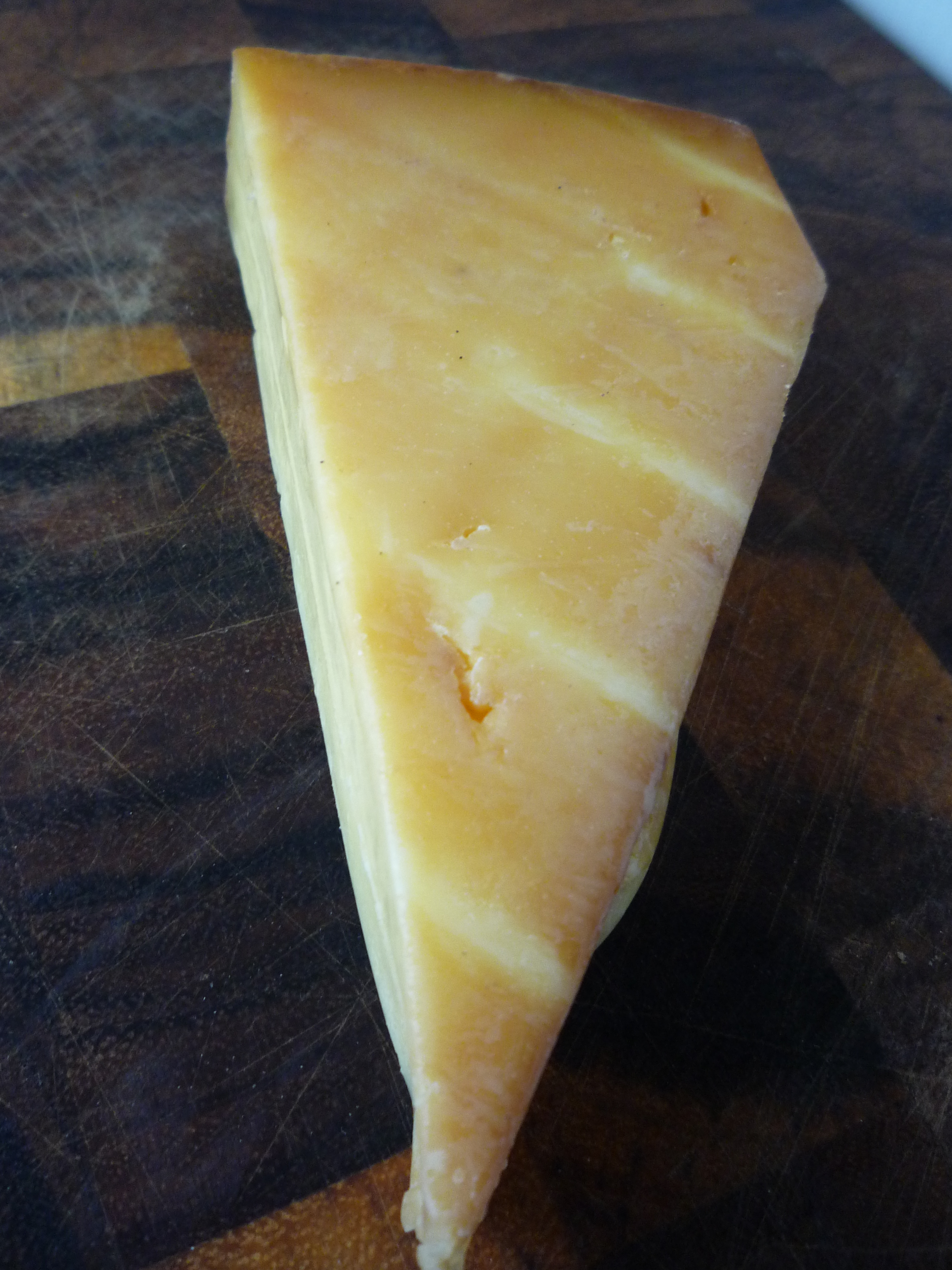
Smoked Lincolnshire Poacher cheese

=== Fish ===
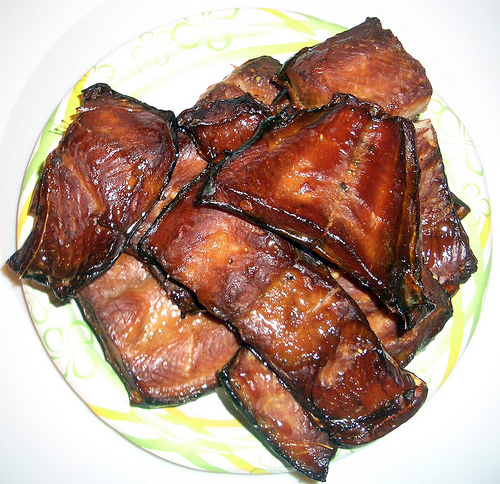
Hot-smoked chum salmon

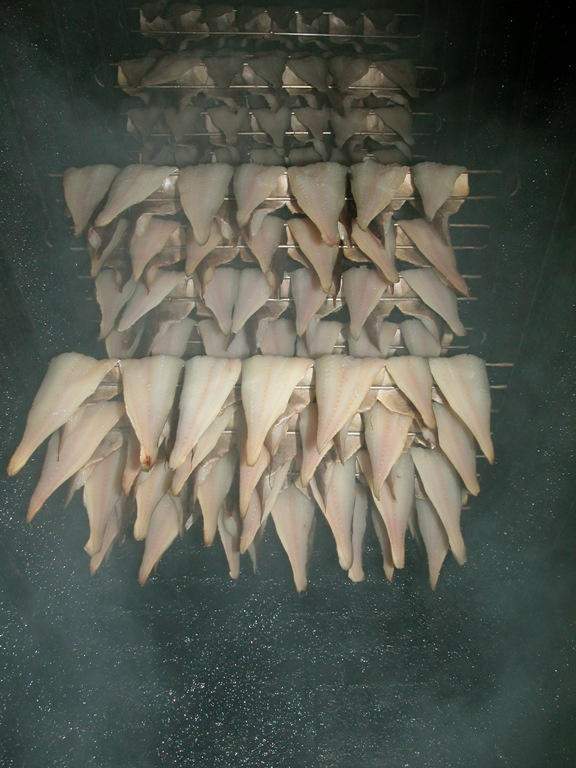
Traditional Grimsby smoked fish, prepared with haddock. Cod is also used in this product, which has Protected Geographical Indication status in the European Union.

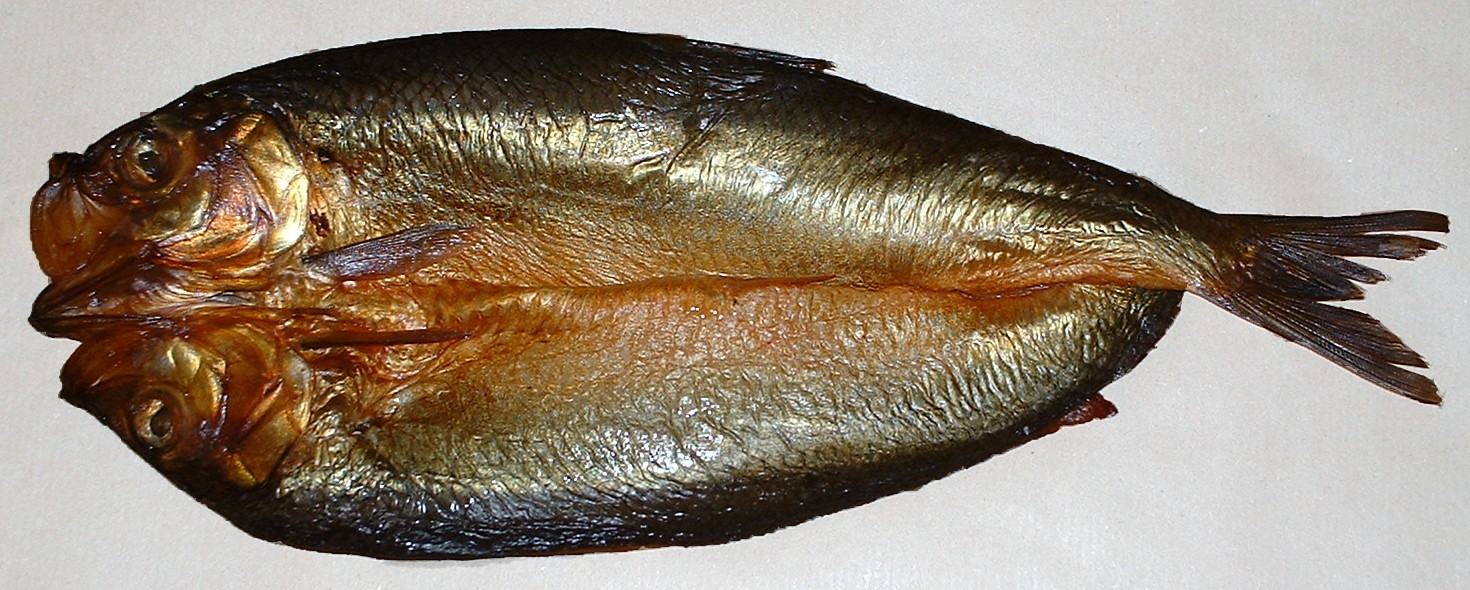
Kippered "split" herring

Smoked fish is fish that has been cured by smoking. This was originally done as a preservative.

- African longfin eel – has fatty flesh which is prized in a smoked or jellied dish
- Arbroath smokie
- Atlantic mackerel
- Bokkoms
- Bonga shad
- Buckling
- Cakalang fufu – a smoked tuna dish of the Minahasan people of Indonesia
- Smoked catfish
- Caviar substitutes
  - Lysekil Caviar – a paste made of smoked cod roe, canola oil, sugar, onion, tomato sauce and salt
  - Smörgåskaviar – a Scandinavian smoked fish roe spread
- Cod
- Eja kika – Smoked fish among the Yoruba people of West Africa
- Finnan haddie
- Goldeye
- Gwamegi – Korean style smoked half-dried fish
- Herring
  - Bloater
  - Blueback herring
  - Craster kipper
  - Kipper
- Katsuobushi – Japanese smoked and fermented skipjack tuna (bonito)
- Mullet
- Pudpod – Filipino smoked fish patty usually made from anchovies
- Saramură (Romania)
- Sardine
- Scad
- Smoked eel
- Smoked salmon
  - Lox
- Sprat
- Tinapa – native smoked fish delicacy in the Philippines
- Traditional Grimsby smoked fish
- Trout

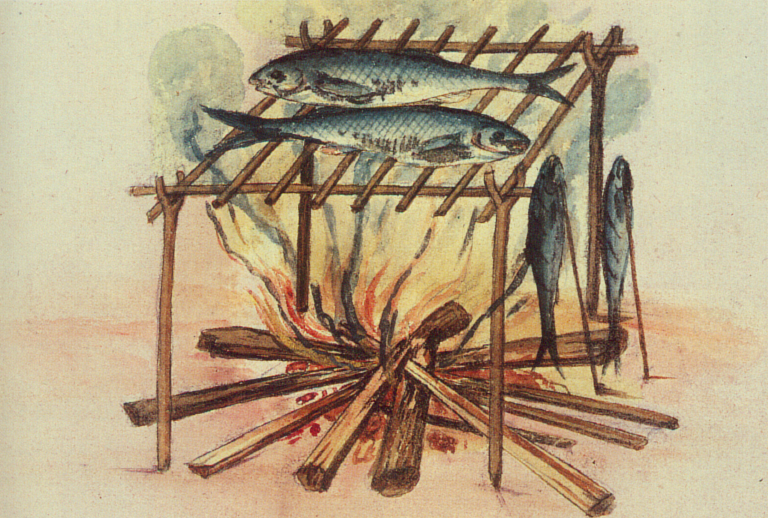
Equipment for curing fish used by the North Carolina Algonquins, 1585

==== Seafood ====
- Smoked mussel
- Smoked oyster
- Smoked scallop

=== Meats ===
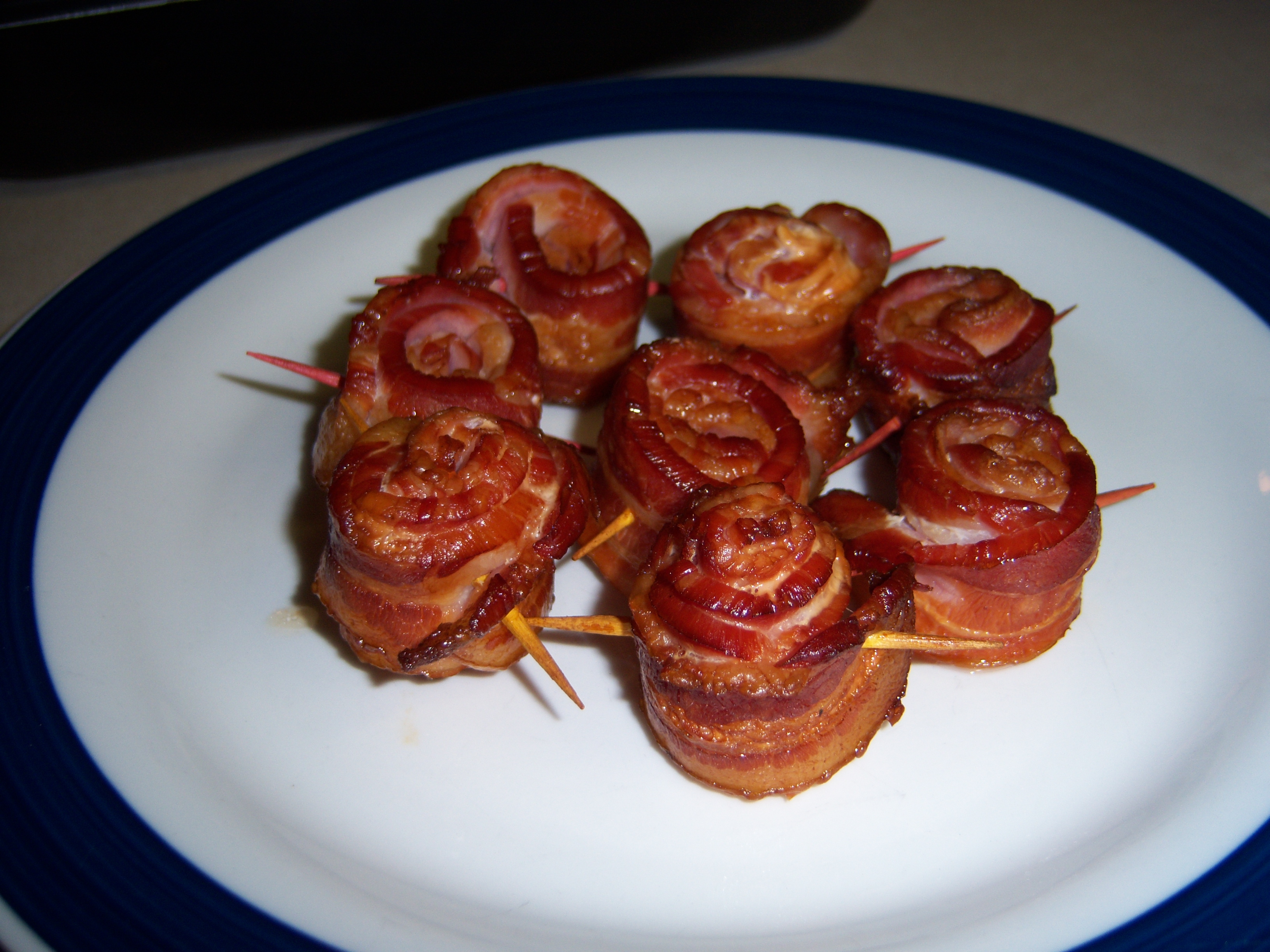
Smoke cured bacon, then cooked with additional hickory smoke

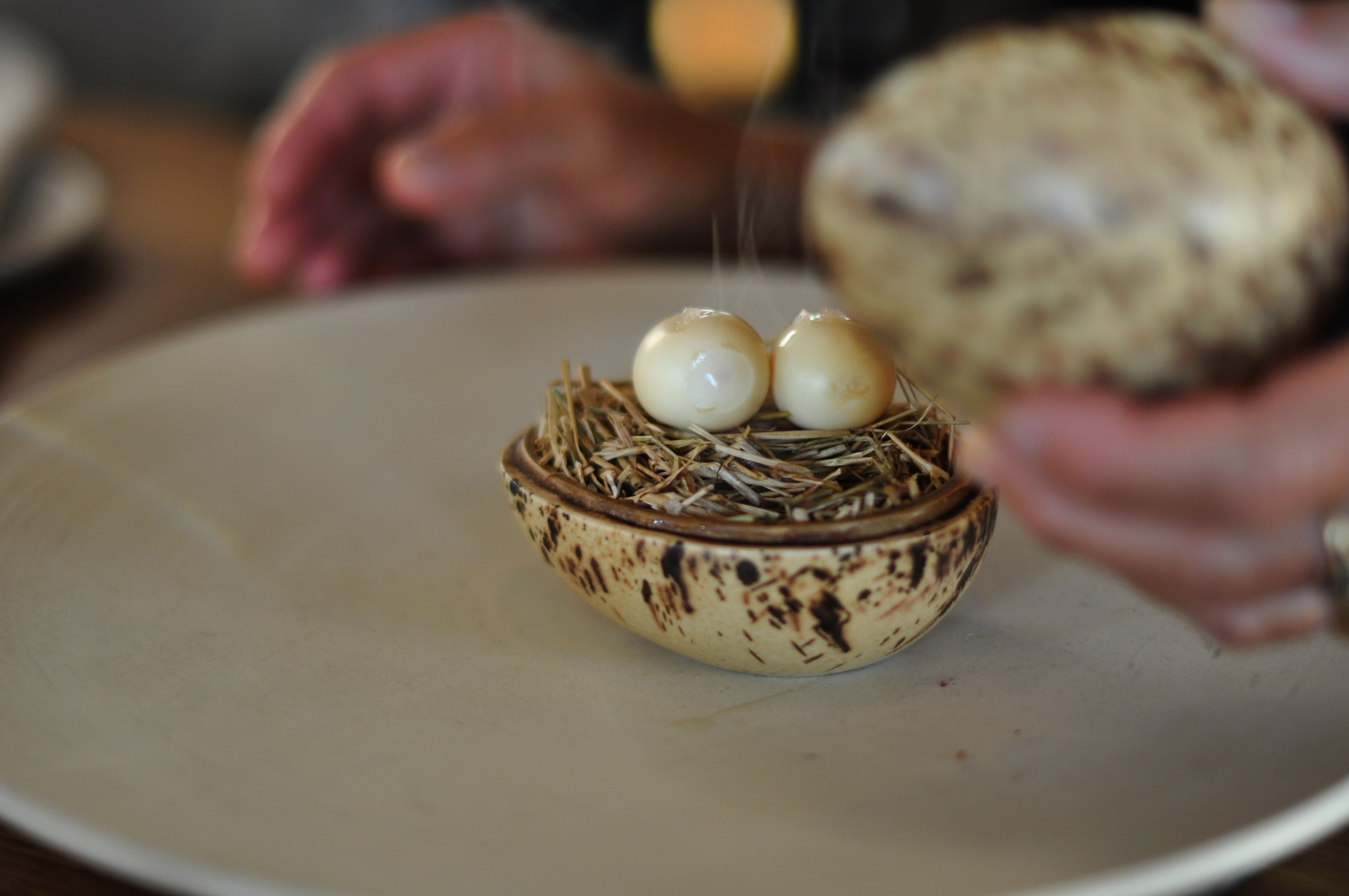
Smoked eggs: pickled and smoked quail eggs at a restaurant

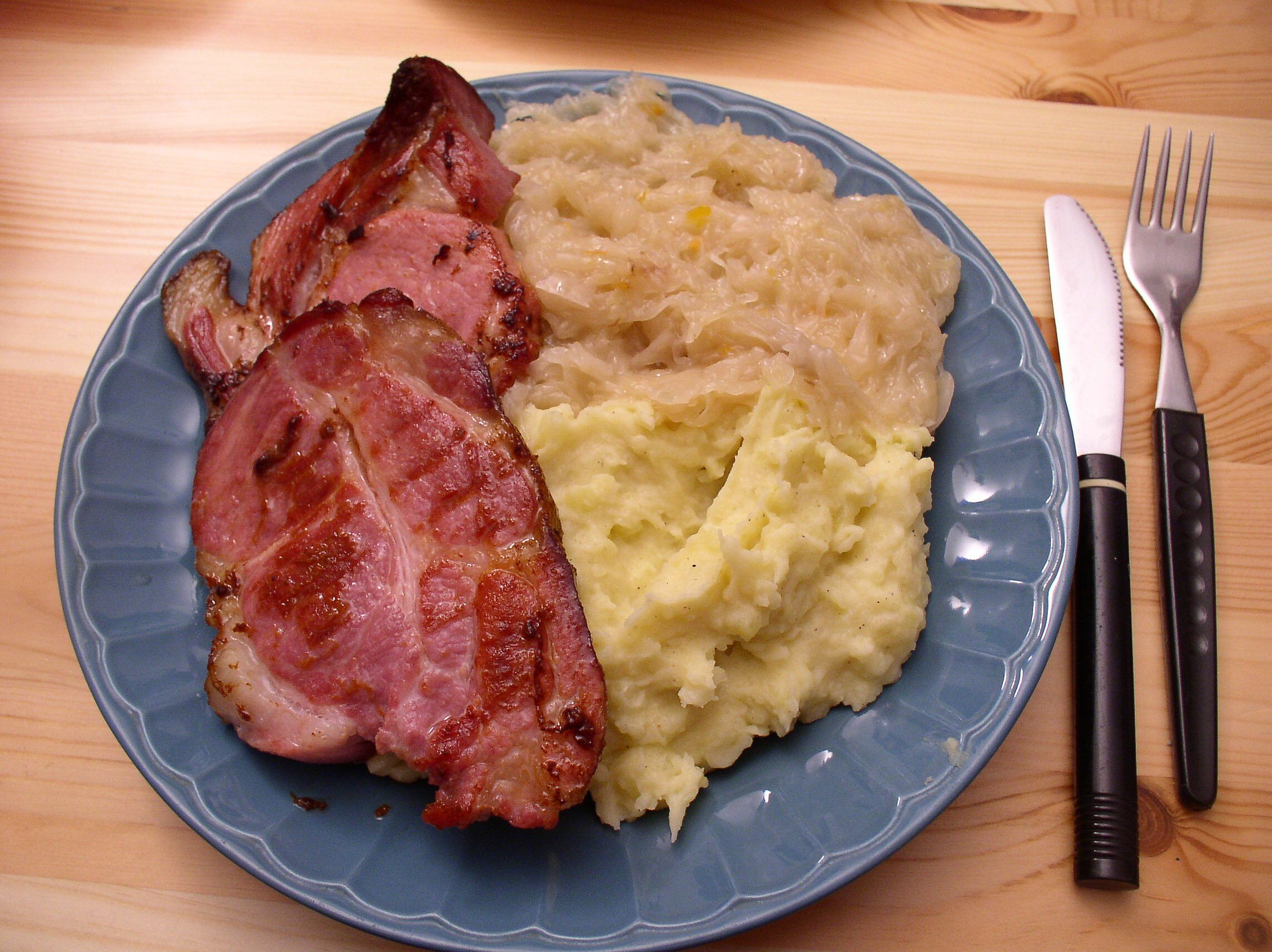
Kassler served with sauerkraut

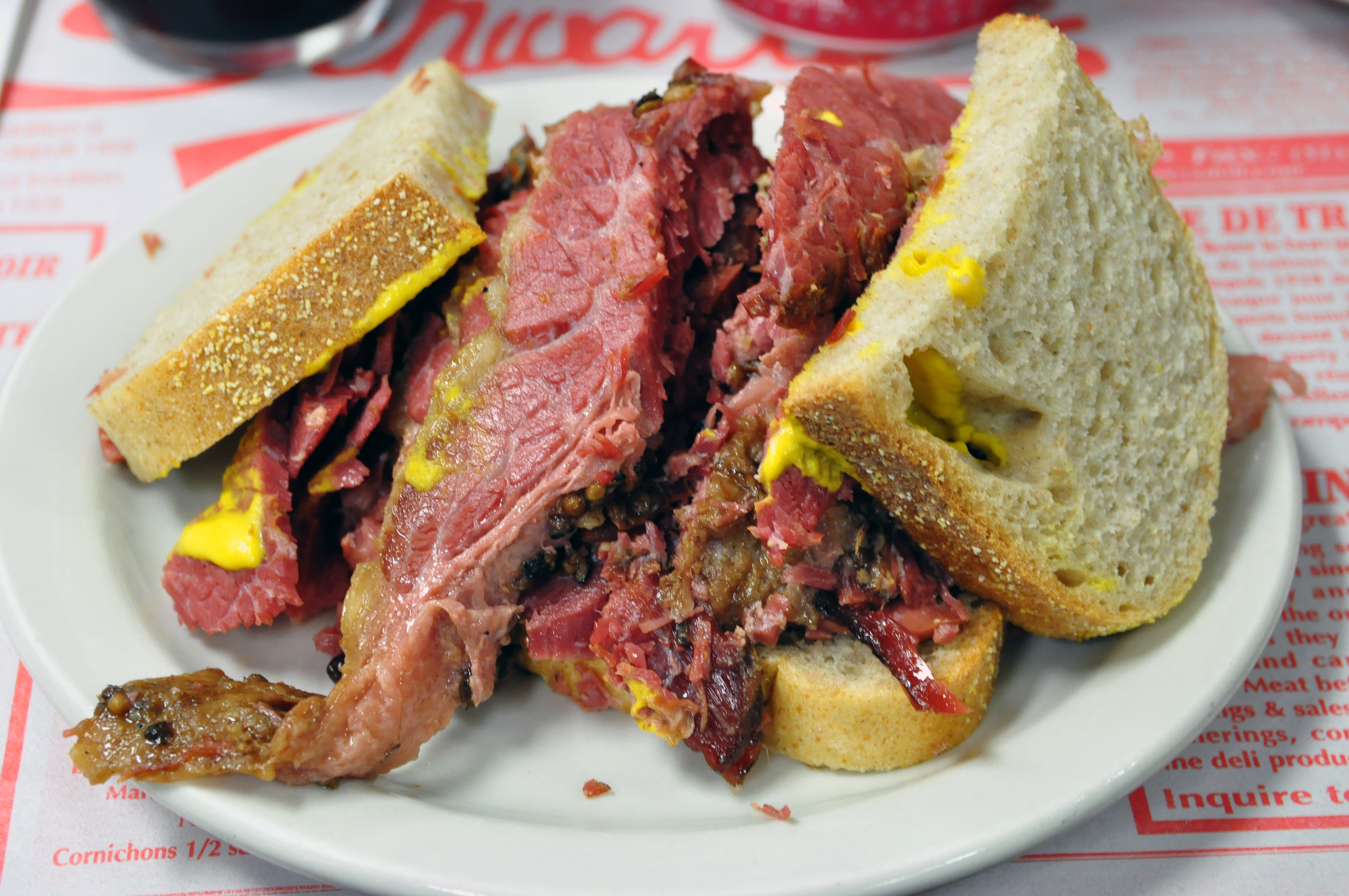
Montreal-style smoked meat from Schwartz's in Montreal

Smoked meat is a method of preparing red meat (and fish) which originates in prehistory. Its purpose is to preserve these protein-rich foods, which would otherwise spoil quickly, for long periods. There are two mechanisms for this preservation: dehydration and the antibacterial properties of absorbed smoke. In modern days, the enhanced flavor of smoked foods makes them a delicacy in many cultures.

- Aliya - smoked dish originally from the Luo tribe of Kenya.
- Bacon – a meat product prepared from a pig and usually cured; some versions are also smoked for preservation or to add flavor
  - Back bacon
- Baleron, Polish smoked pork neck cut
- Brési
- Burnt ends – flavorful pieces of meat cut from the point half of a smoked brisket
- Cecina – in Spanish, means "meat that has been salted and dried by means of air, sun or smoke"
- Charcuterie
- Chaudin
- Dutch loaf
- Elenski but
- Flurgönder – a smoked head cheese
- Gammon
- Grjúpán
- Hangikjöt
- Horse meat – a major meat in only a few countries, it is sometimes smoked
  - Qarta – boiled and pan-fried horse rectum, it is sometimes smoked
  - Zhal – a Kazakh cuisine dish of smoked horse neck lard
- Jeju Black pig
- Jerky
- Kassler
- Meatloaf
- Montreal-style smoked meat
- Pastrami (Pastrama-Romania)
- Pickled pigs' feet
- Pig candy
- Pitina
- Pork jowl
  - Oreilles de crisse
- Pork tail
- Rauchfleisch – German term for meat preserved by salting and cold smoking
- Salo
- Schäufele
- Se'i
- Smalahove
- Sopocka
- Speck
  - Speck Alto Adige PGI
  - Tyrolean Speck
- Suho meso
- Szalonna
- Turkey bacon
- Zhangcha duck

==== Hams ====
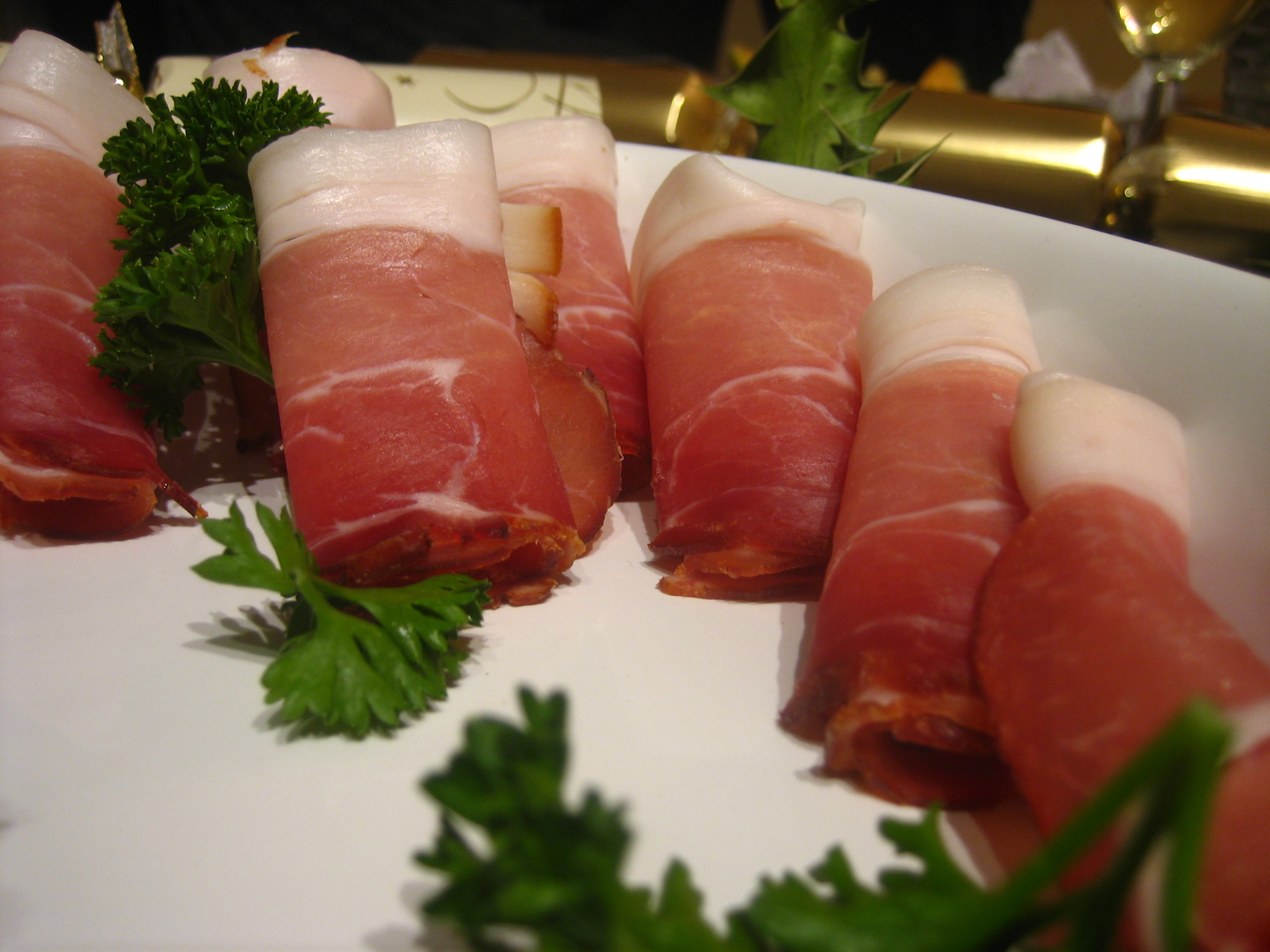
Black Forest ham

- Ham
  - Ammerländer Schinken – a type of dry-cured (and normally smoked) ham produced in the Ammerland area of North Germany. It has PGI status under EU law.
  - Black Forest ham
  - Christmas ham – some versions are smoked
  - Country ham
  - Ham hock
    - Eisbein
  - Stuffed ham
  - Tasso ham
  - Westphalia ham
Smoked ham products

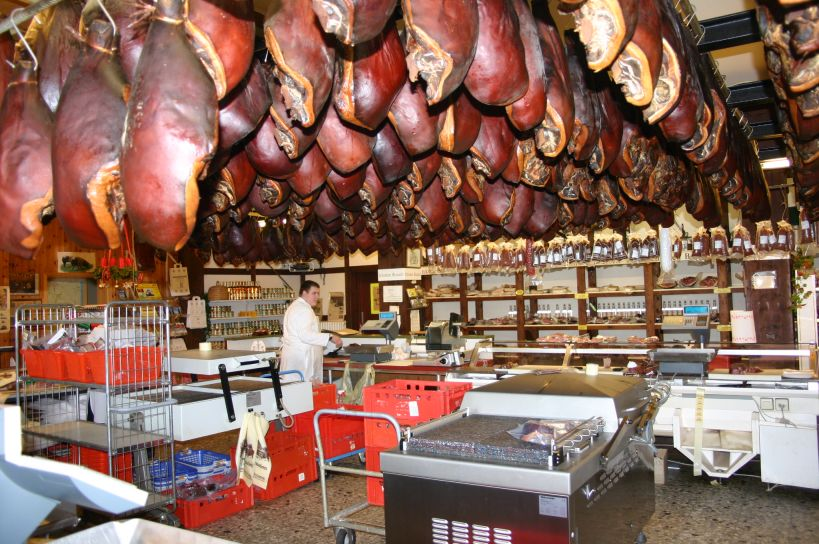
Ham in a smokehouse in Schleswig-Holstein, Germany

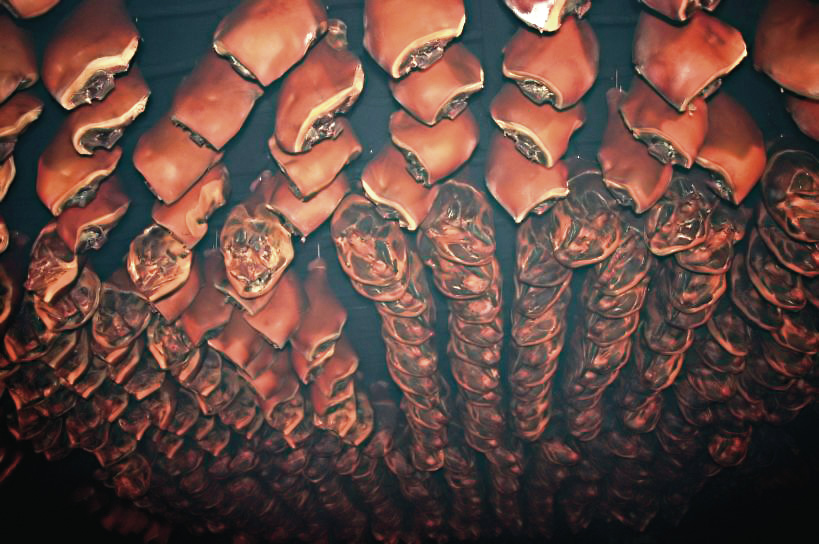
Another image of ham at the same Schleswig-Holstein smokehouse

==== Sausages ====
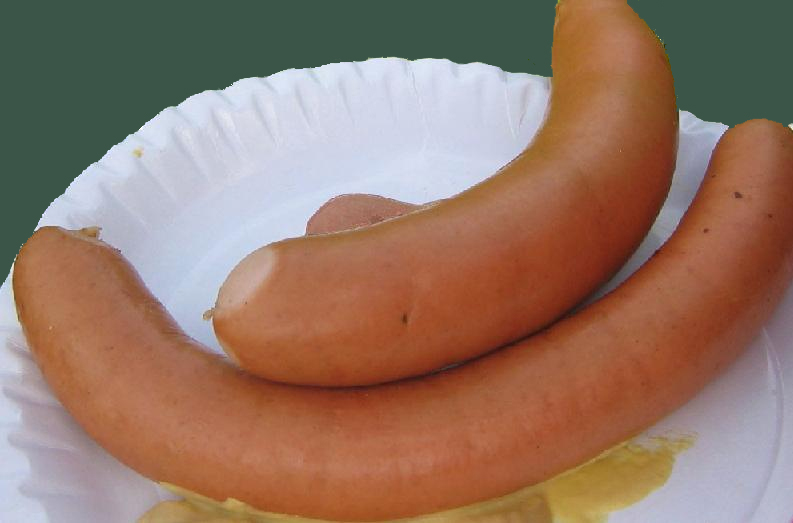
Bockwurst

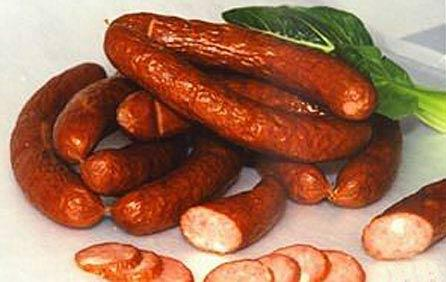
Smoked Chinese sausage from Harbin

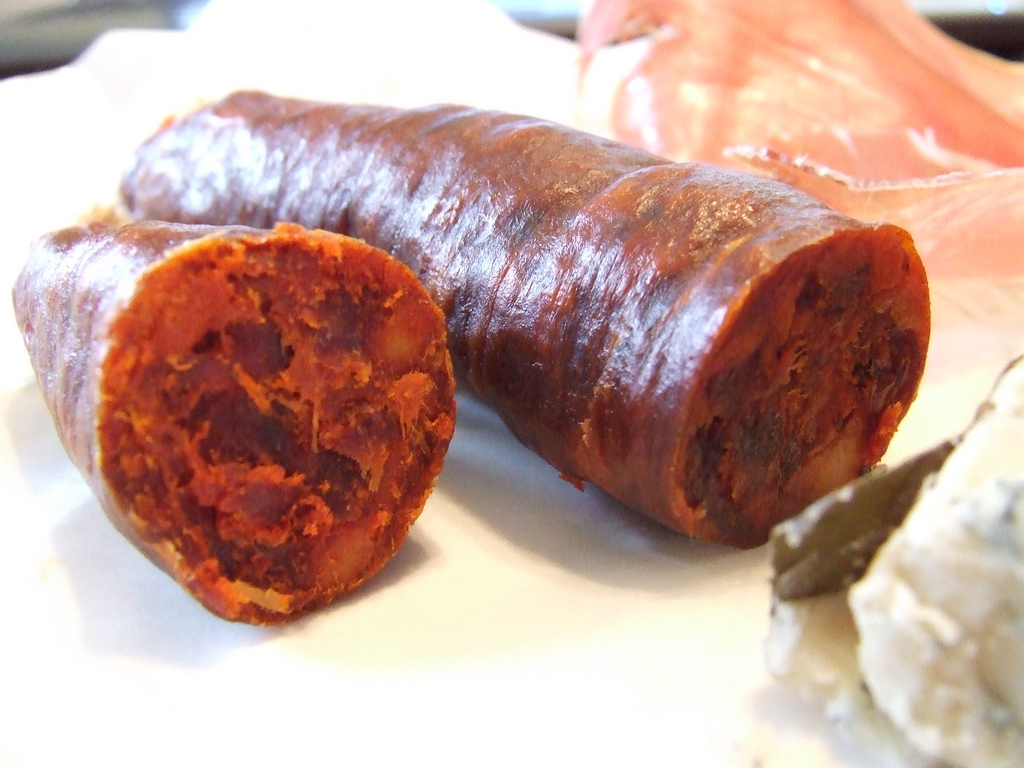
Spanish chorizo

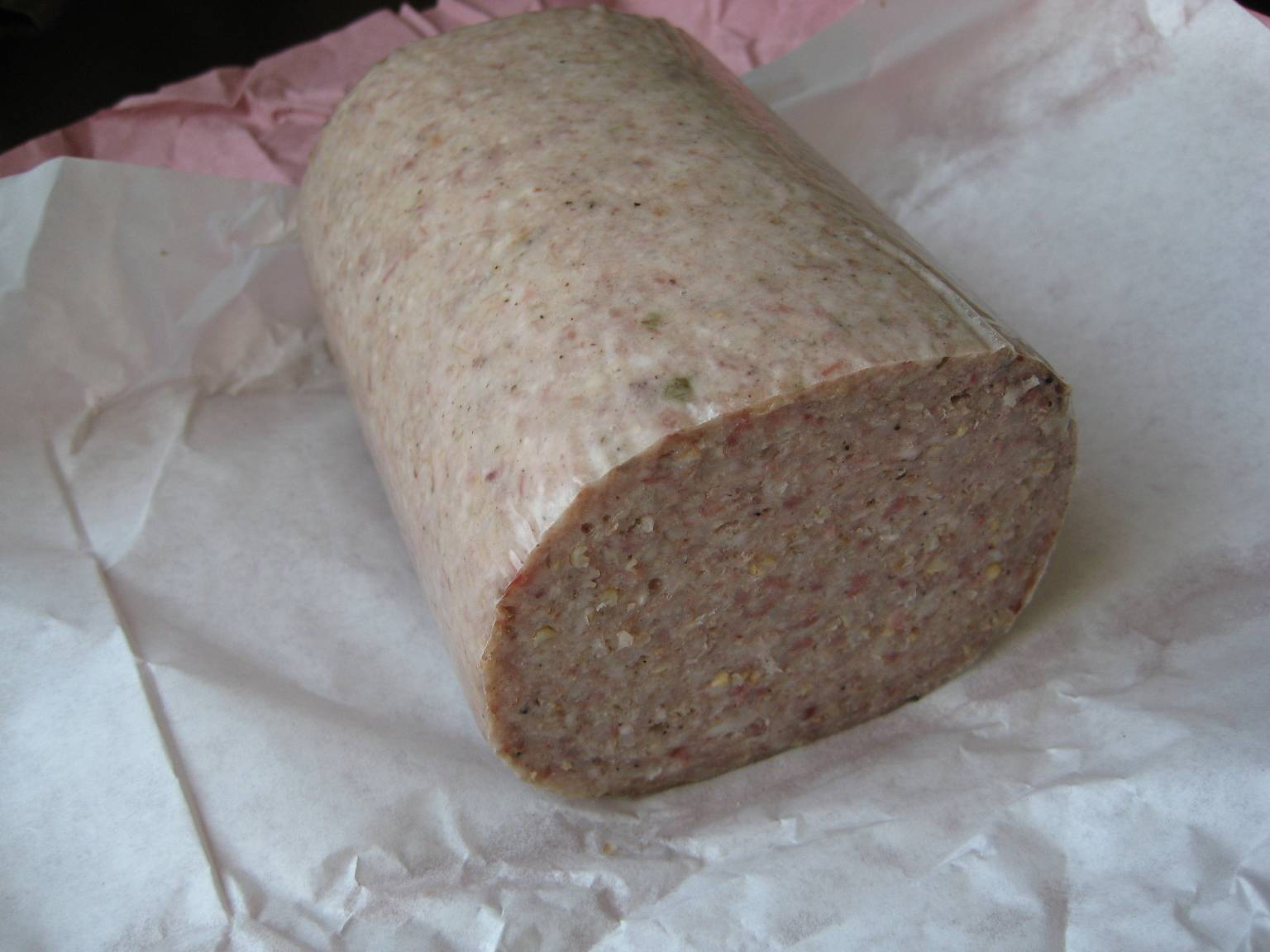
Raw knipp

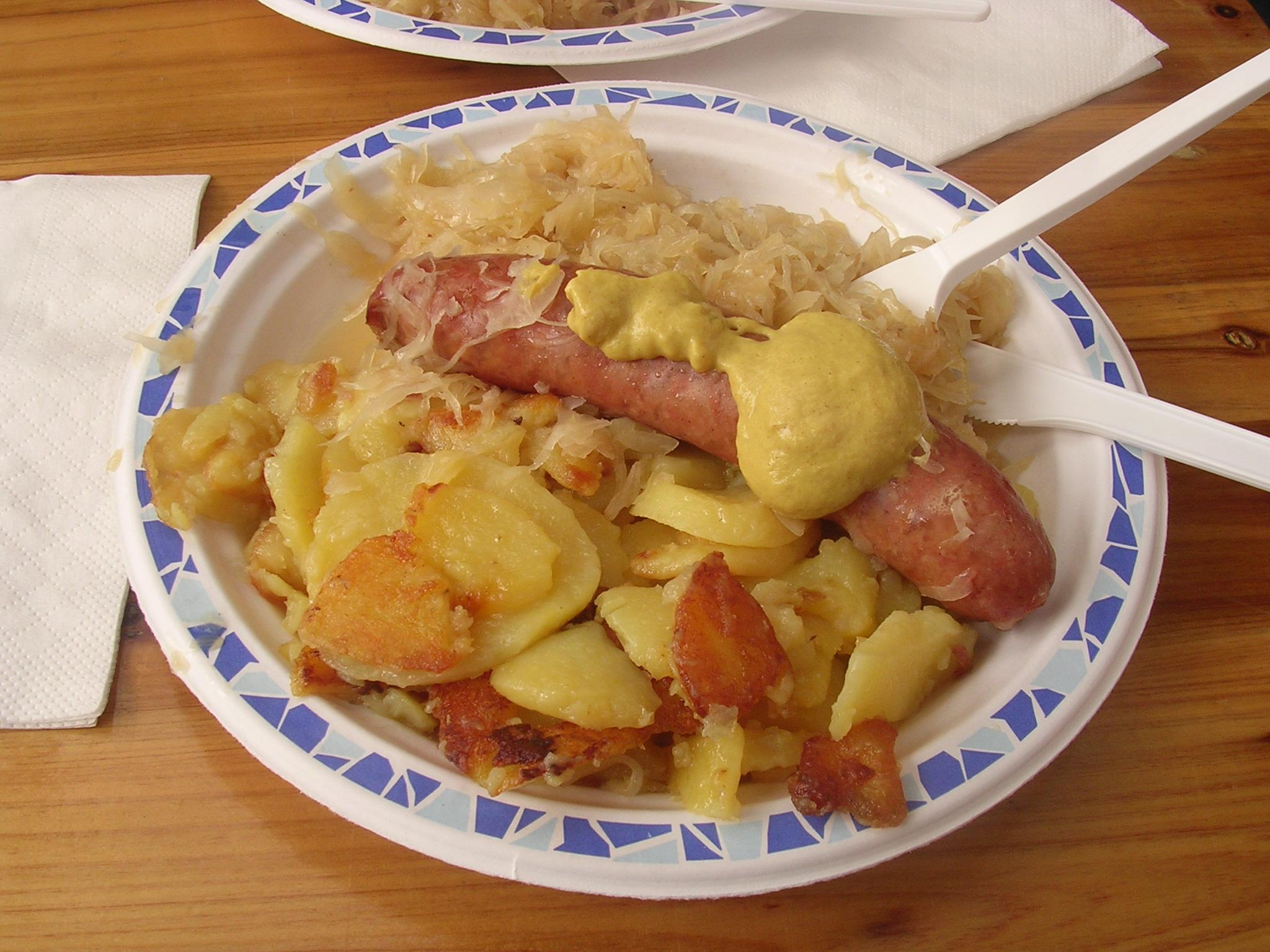
Mettwurst with sauerkraut and potatoes

Sausage is a food usually made from ground meat with a skin around it. Typically, a sausage is formed in a casing traditionally made from intestine, but sometimes synthetic. Sausage making is a traditional food preservation technique. Sausages may be preserved by curing, drying, or smoking. Many types and varieties of sausages are smoked to help preserve them and to add flavor.

- Ahle Wurst – a hard pork sausage made in northern Hesse, Germany. Its name is a dialectal form of alte Wurst – "old sausage".
- Alheira
- Amsterdam ossenworst
- Andouille
- Bierwurst
- Bockwurst
- Bologna sausage and barbecue bologna
- Boudin
- Breakfast sausage
- Cabanossi
- Chinese sausage – a generic term referring to the many different types of sausages originating in China
- Chorizo
- Ciauscolo
- Debrecener
- Embutido
- Farinheira
- Frankfurter Würstchen
- Half-smoke
- Hungarian sausages – The cuisine of Hungary produces a vast number of types of sausages.
- Isterband
- Kielbasa
- Knackwurst
- Knipp
- Kochwurst
- Kohlwurst
- Krakowska
- Kulen
- Lebanon bologna
- Linguiça
- Liverwurst
  - Braunschweiger
- Loukaniko
- Lukanka
- Lucanica
- Mettwurst
- Morteau sausage
- Nădlac sausage (Romania)
- Pinkel
- Rookworst
- Salami
- Skilandis
- Sremska kobasica
- Summer sausage
- Teewurst
- Vienna sausage
- Winter salami
Smoked sausages

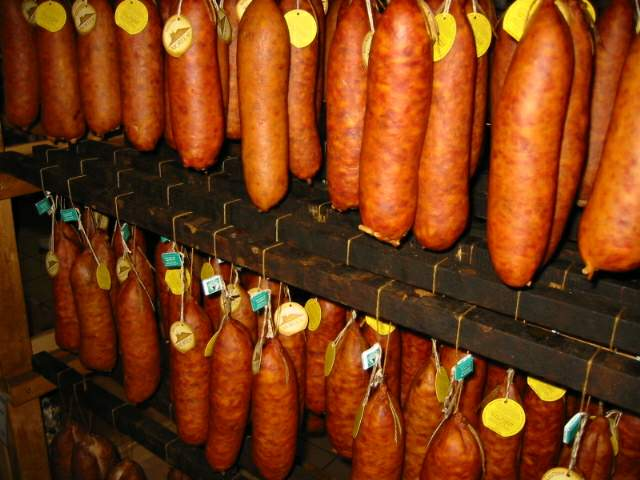
Morteau sausage being smoked

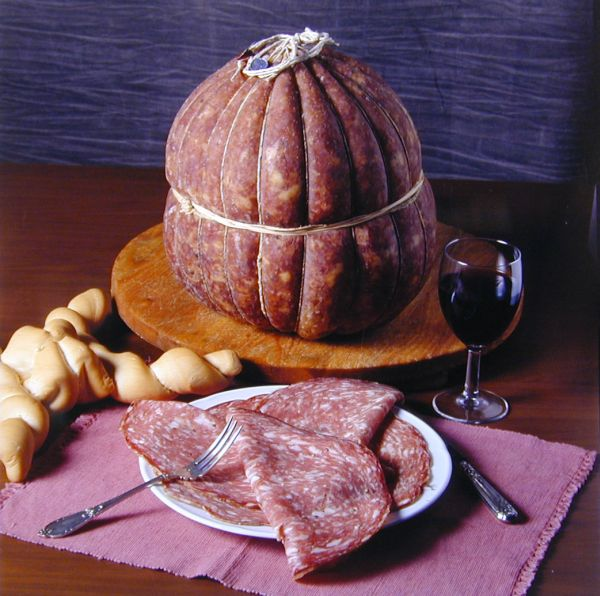
Skilandis sausage

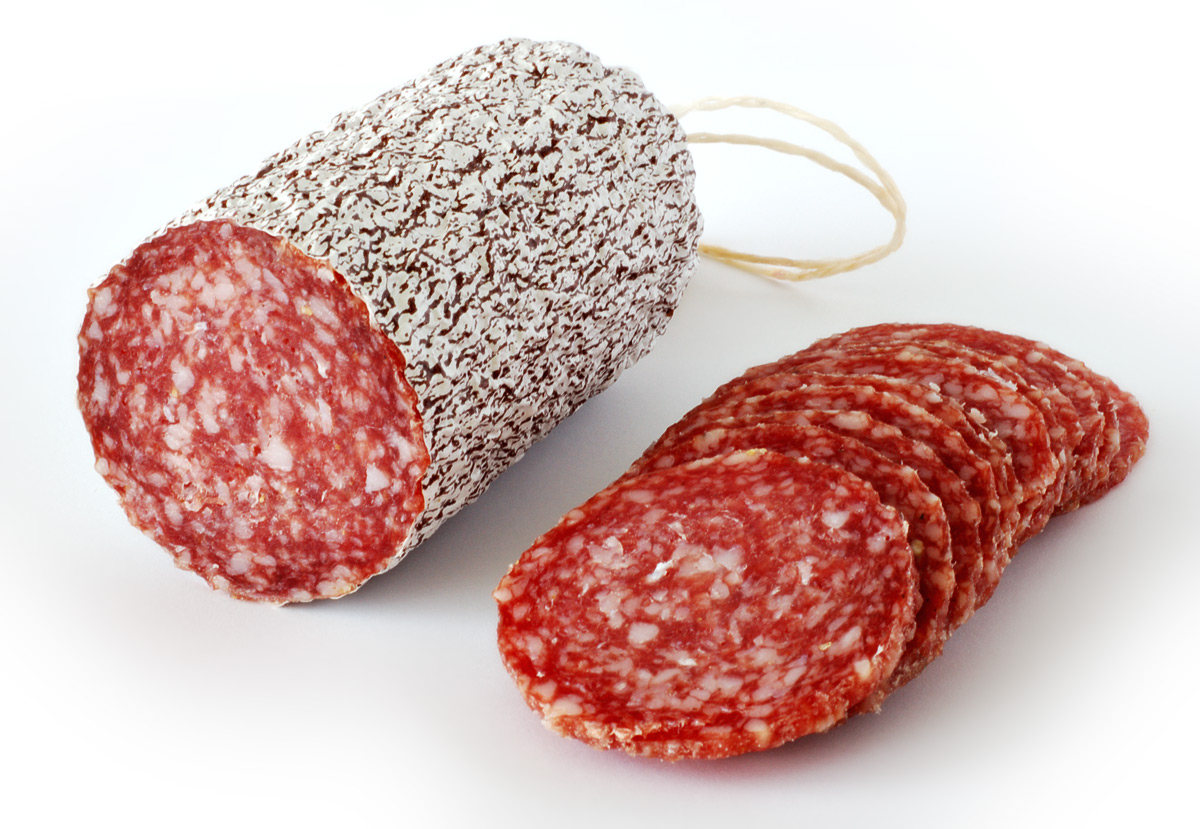
Winter salami

=== Spices ===
- Liquid smoke
- Merkén
- Paprika
- Smoked salt
Smoked spices

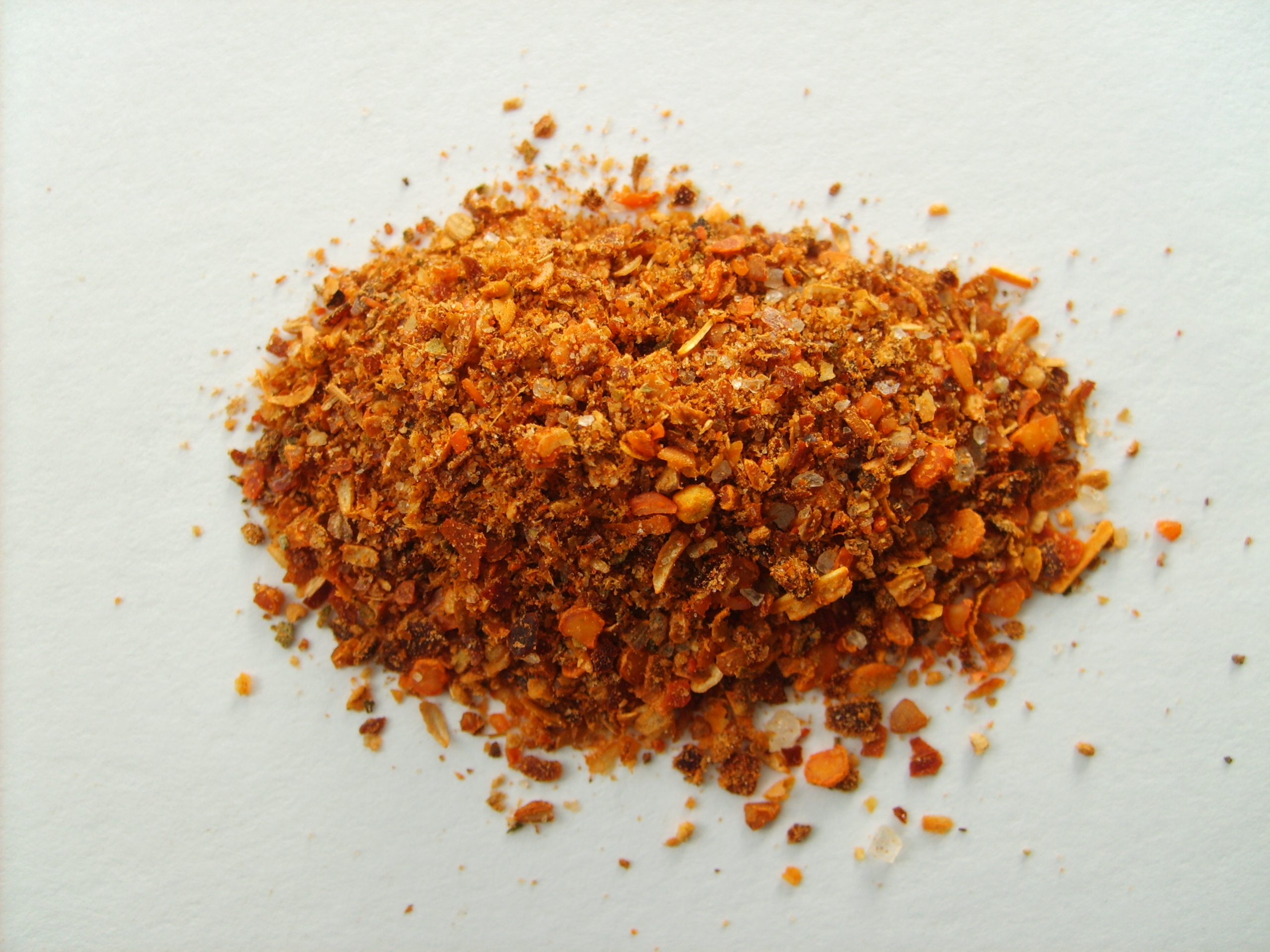
Merkén

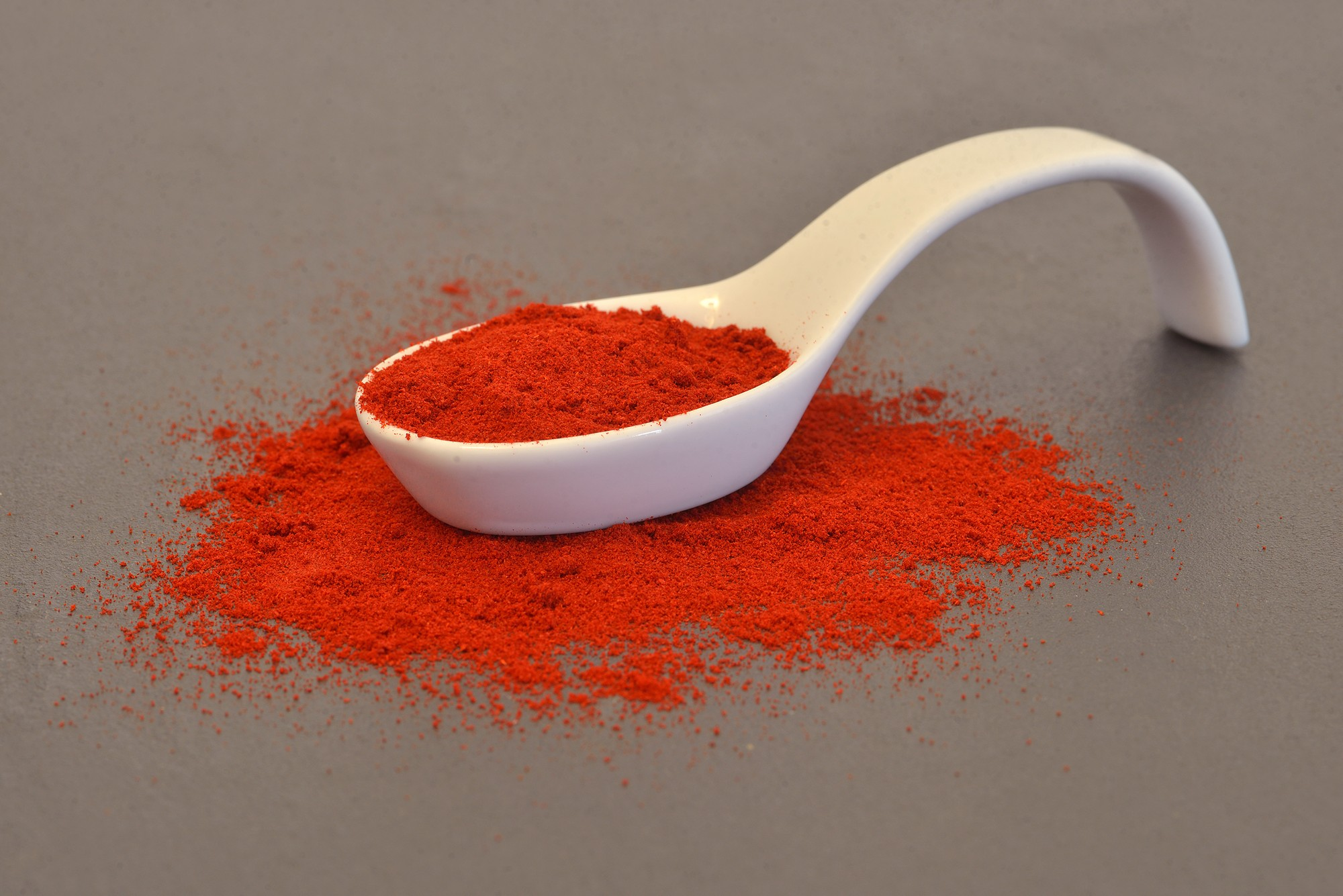
Spanish smoked paprika

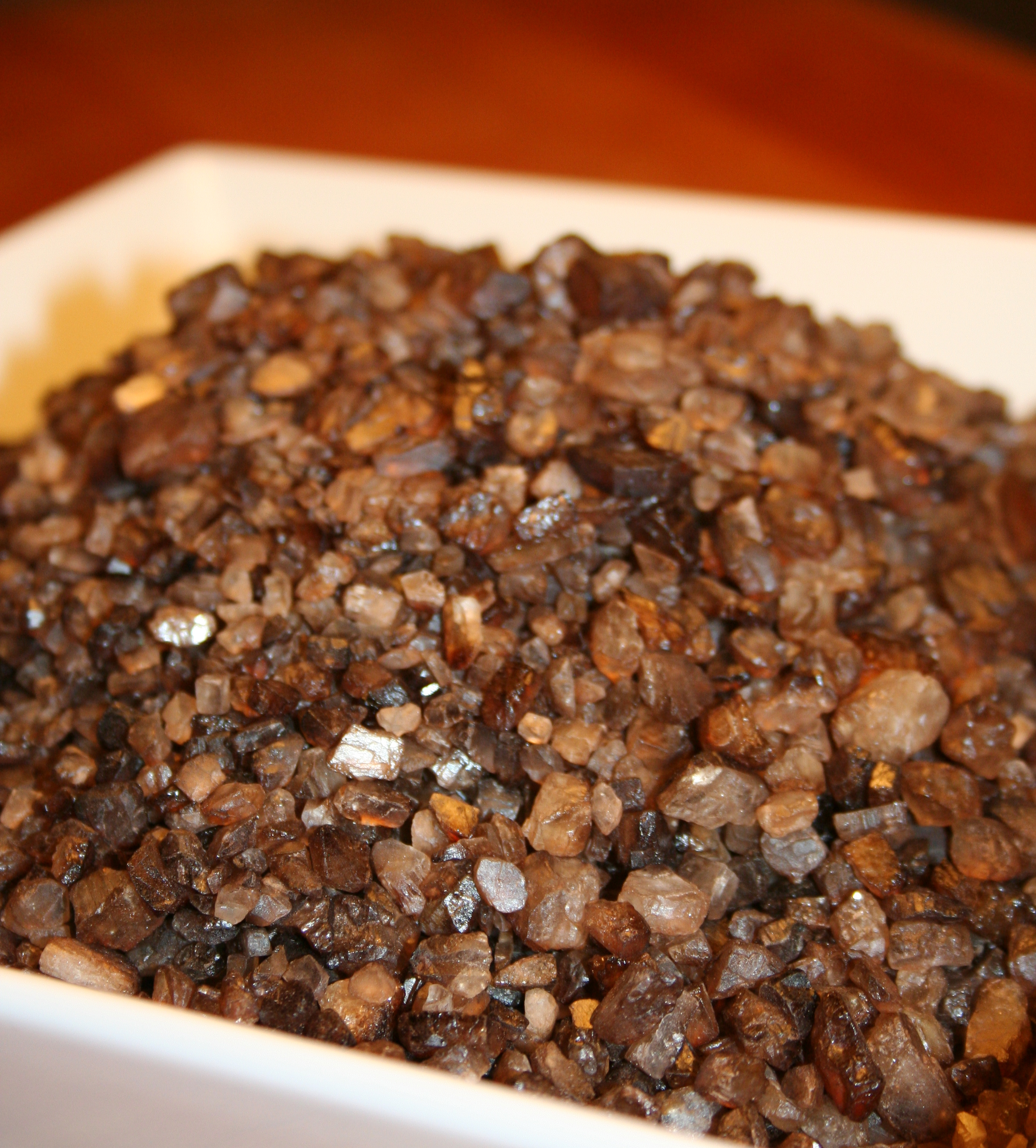
Mesquite smoked salt

=== Other ===
- Alinazik kebab – a Turkish smoked eggplant dish
- Baingan bharta – an Indian smoked eggplant dish
- Chipotle – smoke-dried jalapeño chili pepper popular in Mexico and the American Southwest
- Jallab – a Middle-Eastern fruit and rose syrup smoked with Arabic incense
- Smoked egg – smoked quail or other fowl eggs
- Smoked garlic – popular in several areas of the world
- Smoked plum – an East Asian smoked fruit also used to make the Korean medicinal tea, Jeho-tang
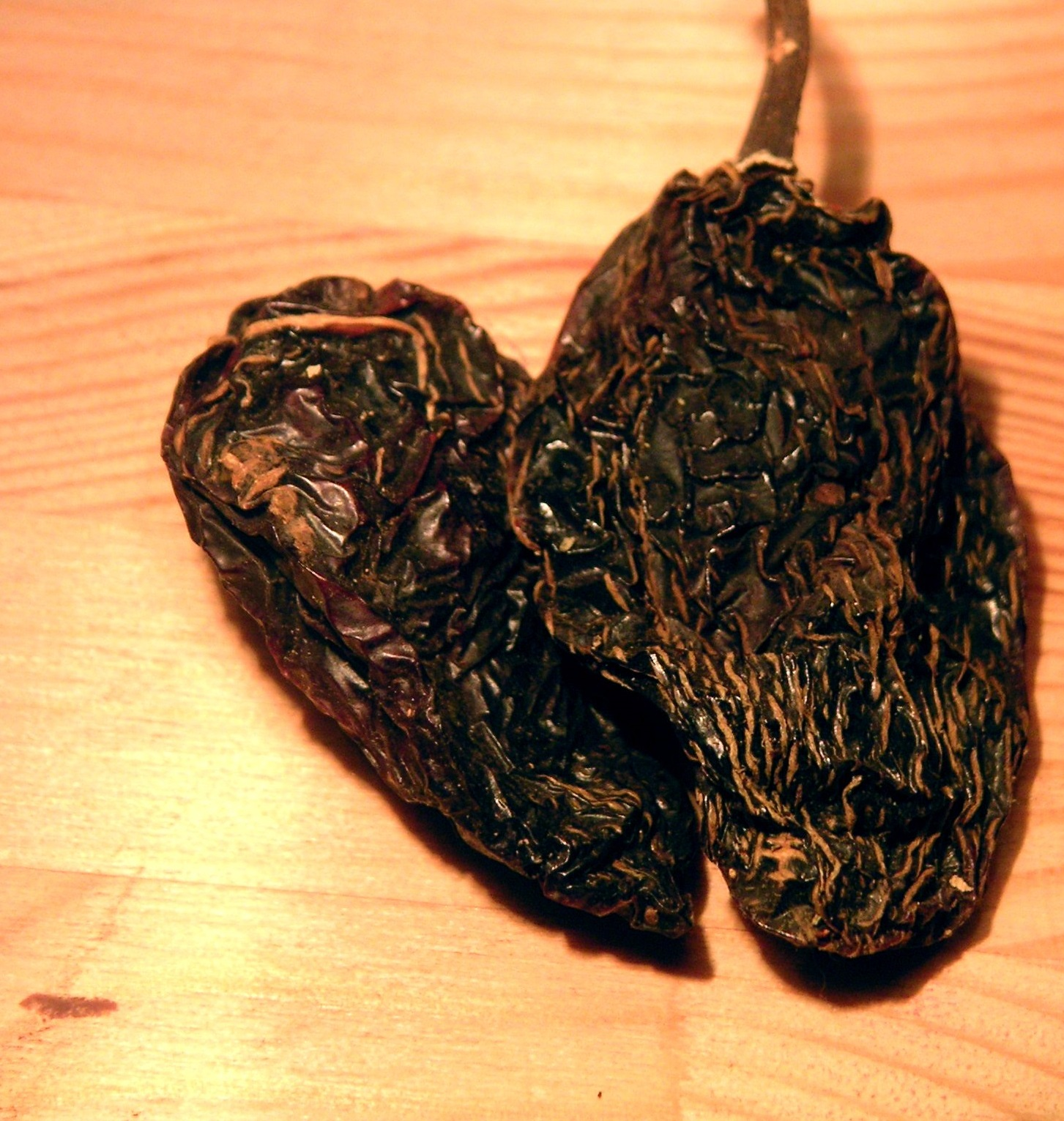
Chipotle

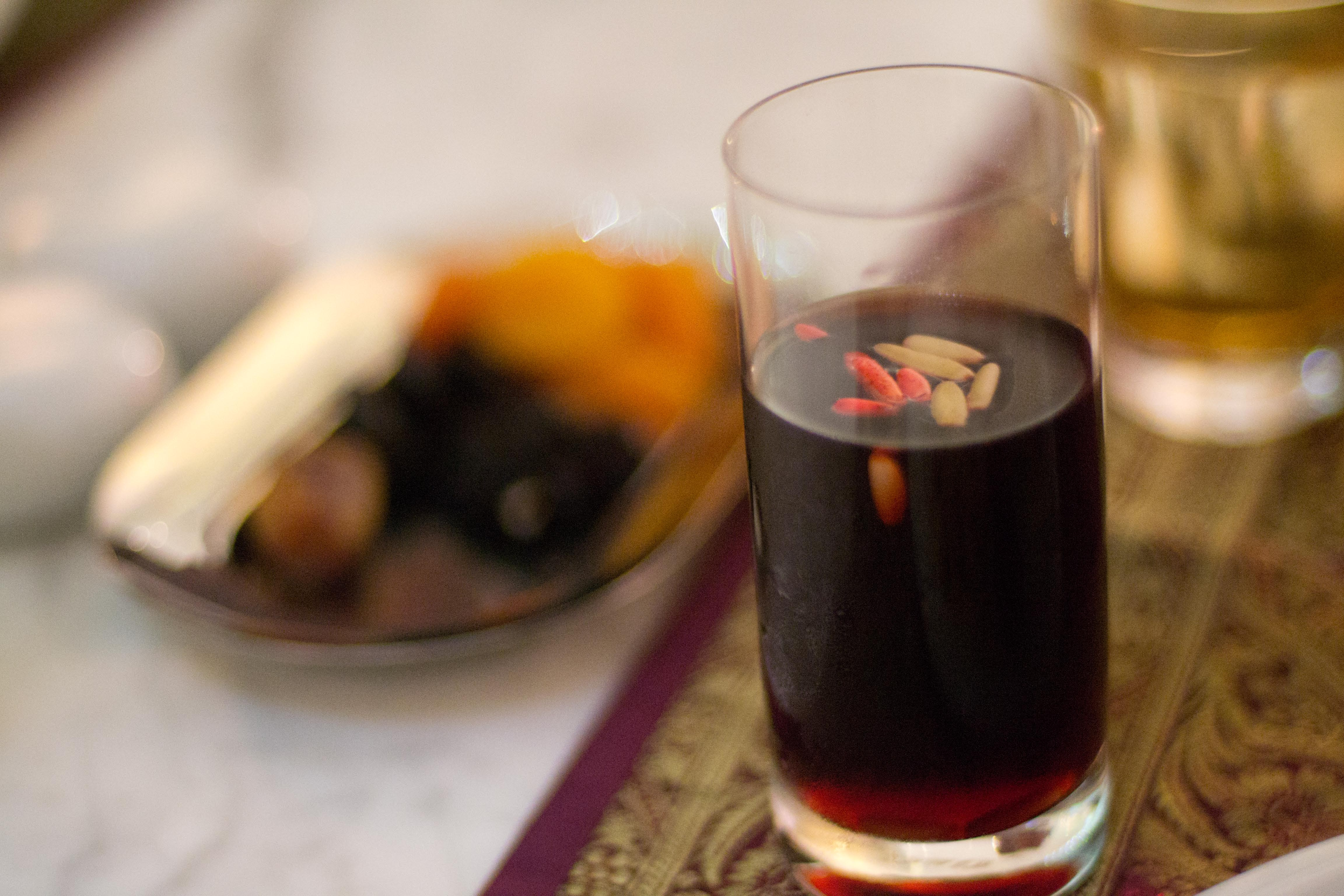
Jallab, made with carob and fruits smoked with incense

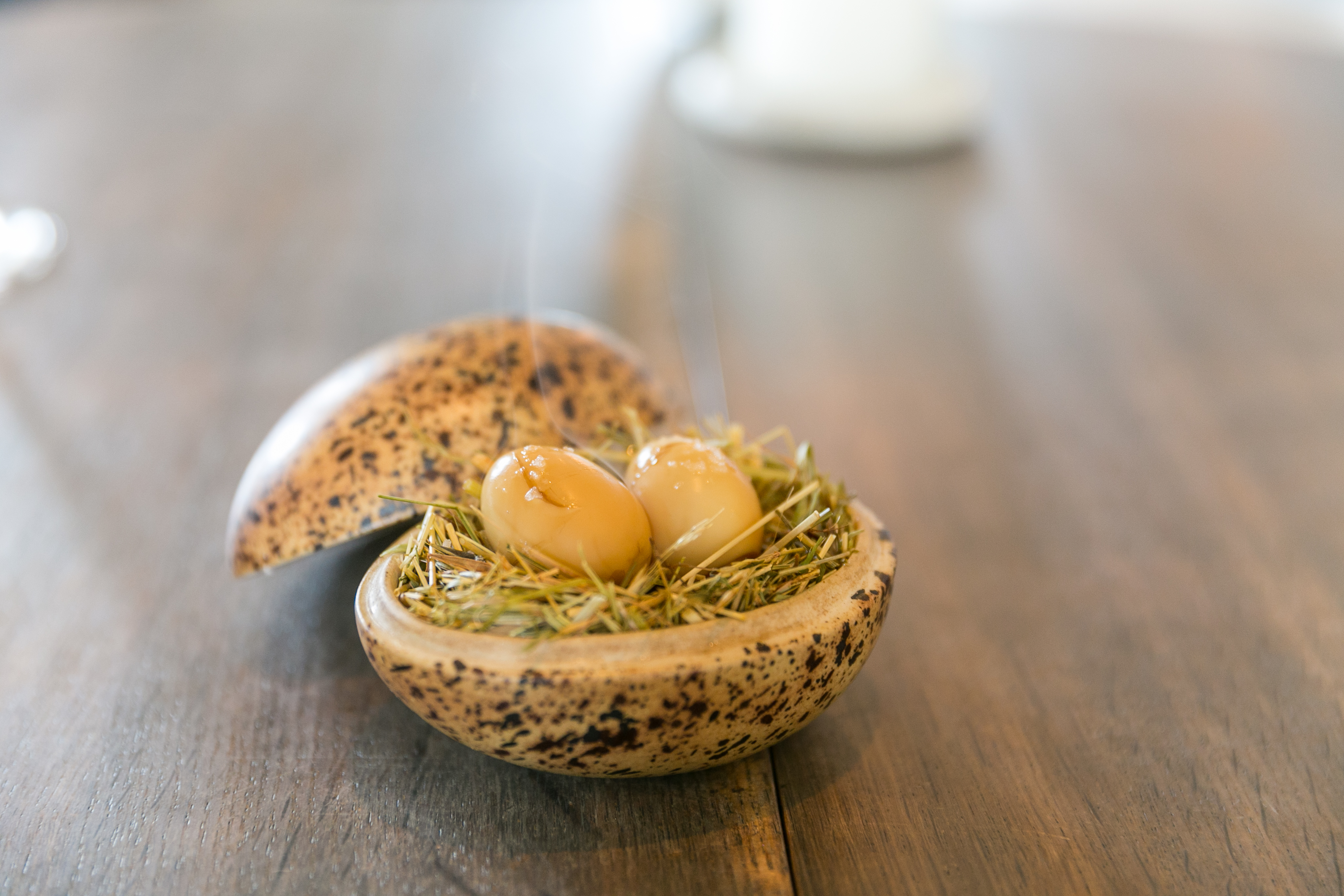
Danish-style smoked and pickled quail egg

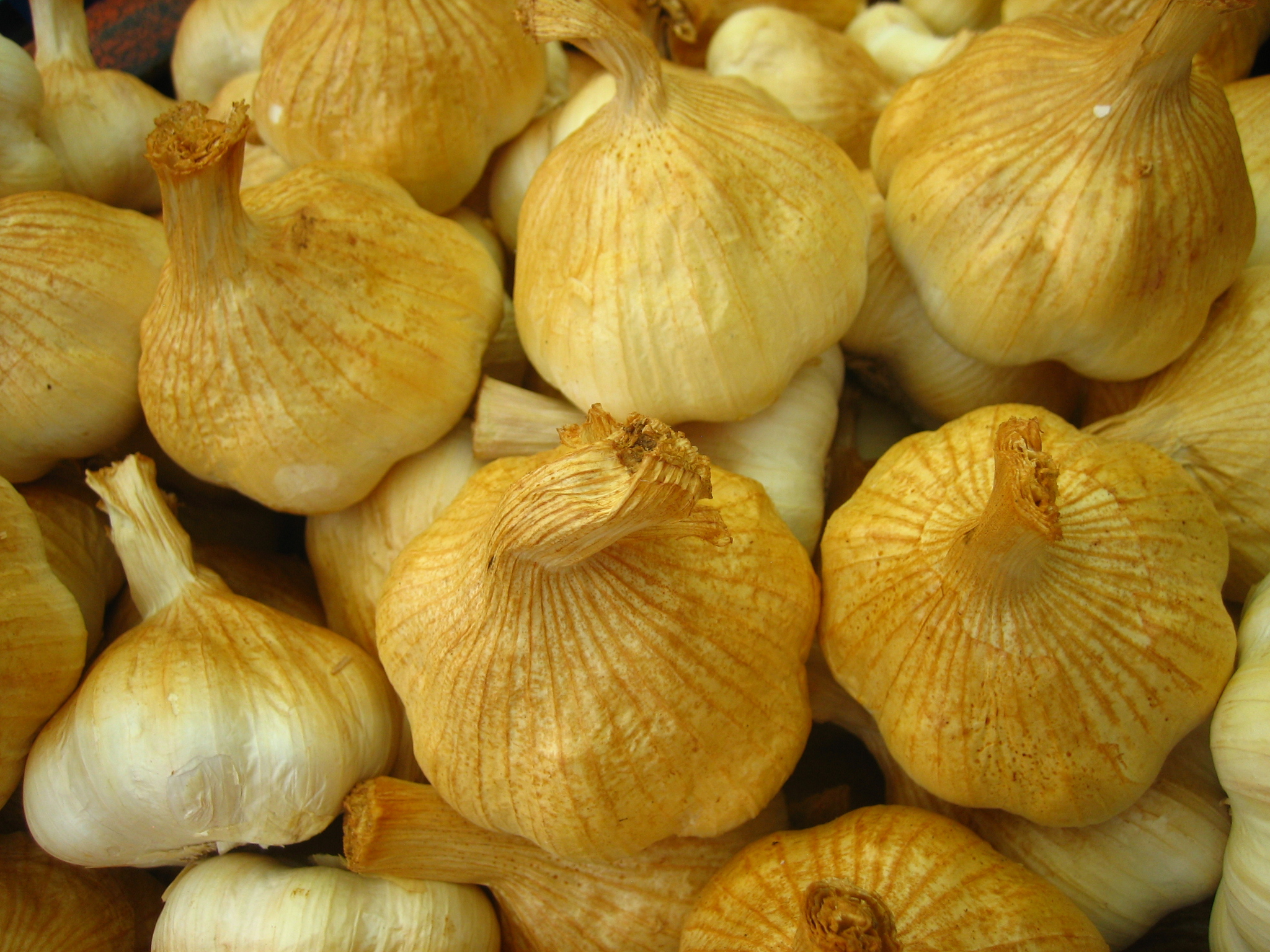
Smoked garlic

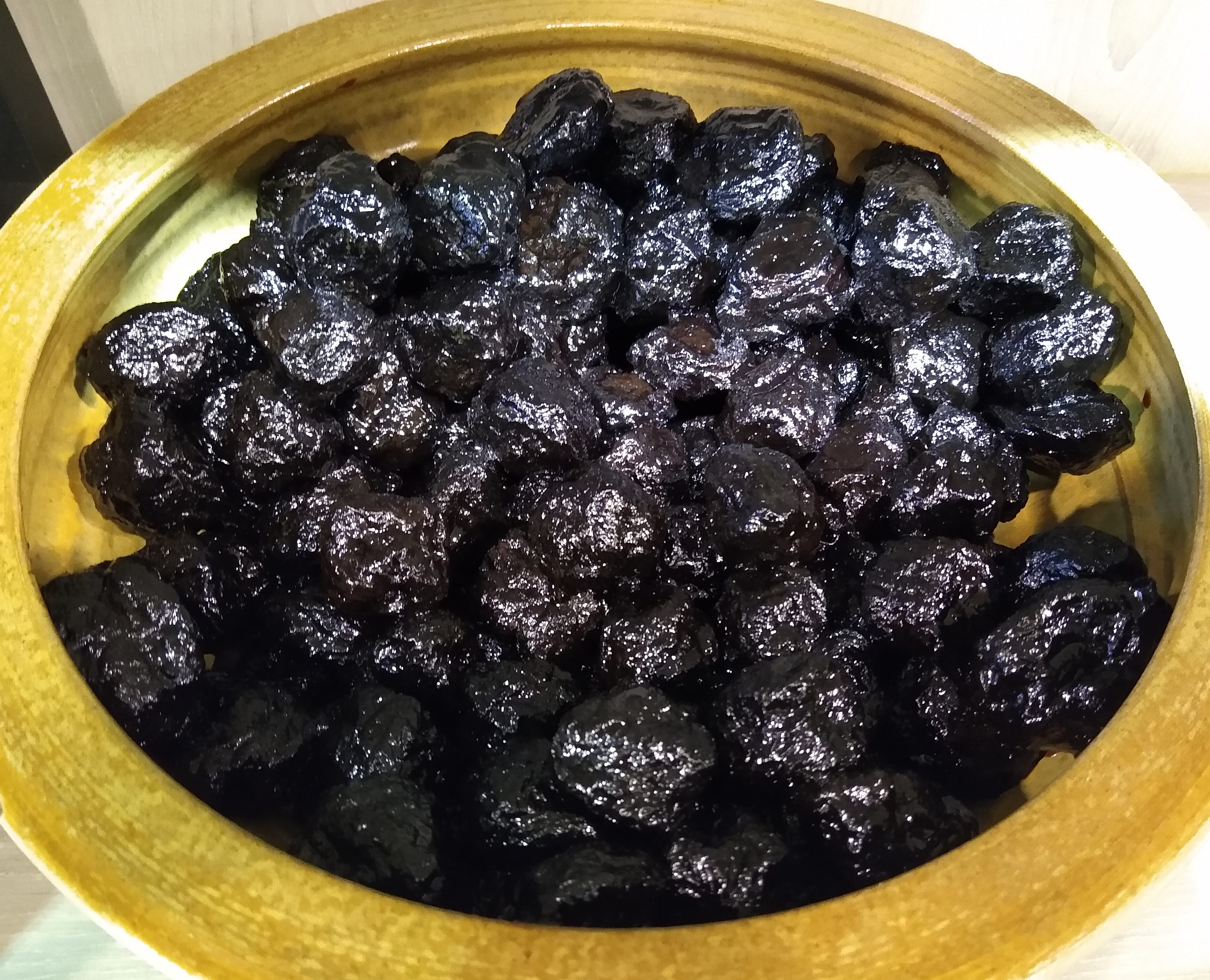
Smoked plums in Tamsui, New Taipei City

== See also ==
- Barbecue
  - Barbecue in the United States
  - List of barbecue dishes
- Brining
- Crazy Snake Rebellion
- Curing
- Drying
- Fumarium
- List of bacon dishes
- List of dried foods
- List of hams
- List of pork dishes
  - List of ham dishes
- List of sausage dishes
- List of sausages
- List of spit-roasted foods
- Sausage making
- Smokehouse
- Smoke ring (cooking)

=== In cuisines ===
- Naga cuisine
- Yamal cuisine – Hot smoked fish
