= Pig candy =

Bacon-based dessert

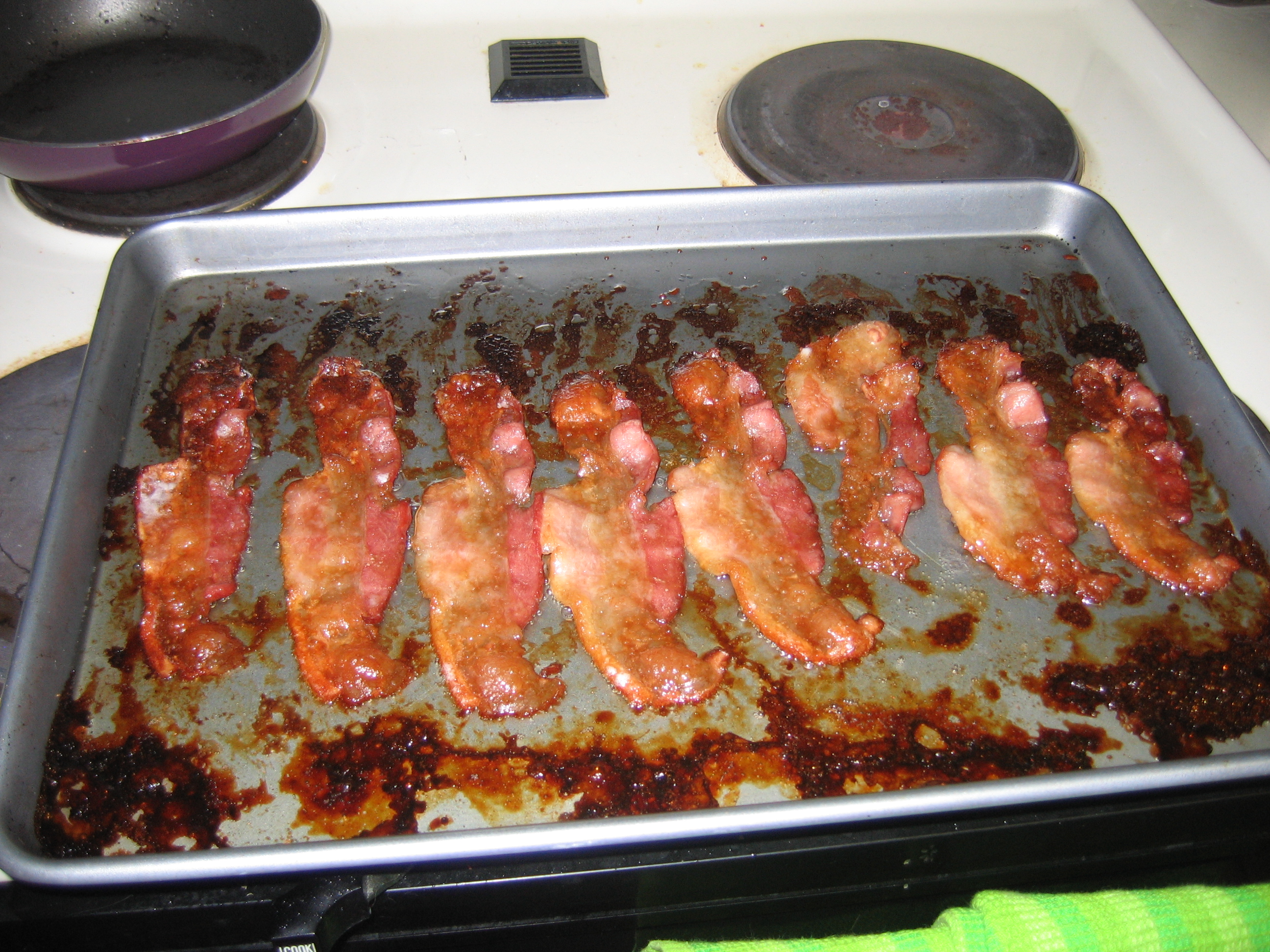
- Course: Dessert
- Place of origin: United States
- Serving temperature: Warm or cold
- Main ingredients: Smoked bacon, pecans, caramel or brown sugar

Pig candy is a dessert made by taking thick strips of smoked bacon and pecans and coating them in caramel or another type of sugar, notably brown sugar. Cayenne pepper can be added and it can be dipped in chocolate. This dish is then served warm or cold and is popular in the southern United States, and it has also become very popular in Washington D.C. It is similar to glazed bacon, featured on Martha Stewart Living.

== See also ==
- List of smoked foods
