= Lincolnshire Poacher cheese =

English hard cheese

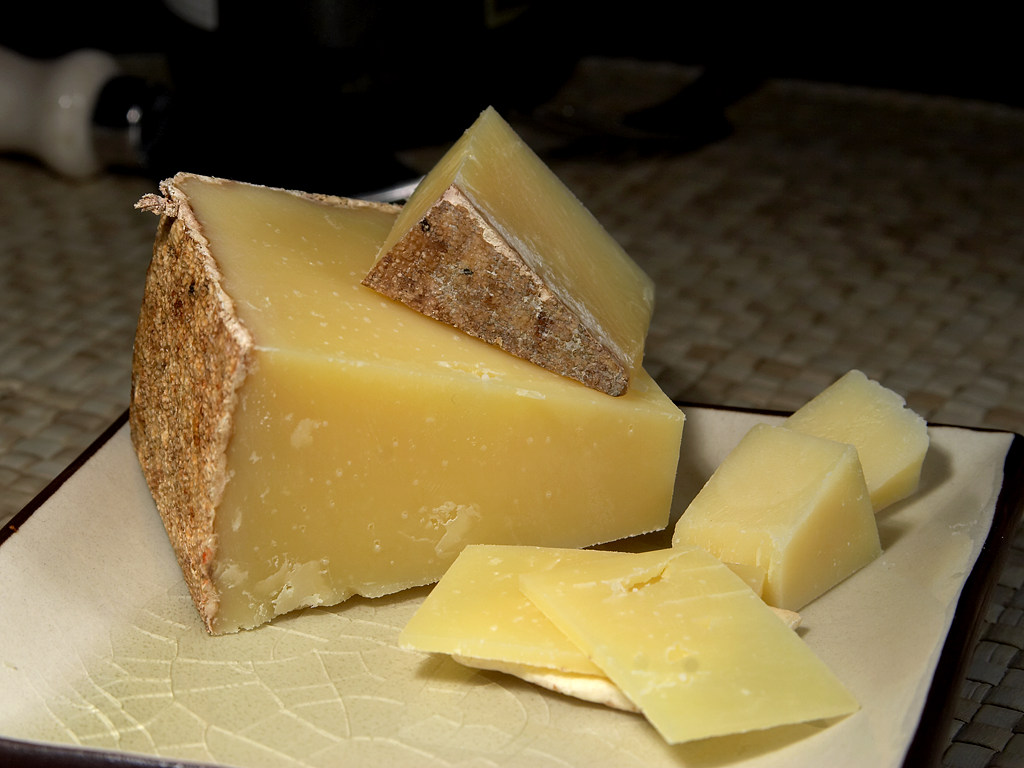
Lincolnshire Poacher cheese

Lincolnshire Poacher is a hard unpasteurised cow's milk cheese that is generally of a cylindrical shape with a rind resembling granite in appearance. It is made at Ulceby Grange Farm in Alford, Lincolnshire, by craft cheesemaker Richard Tagg. The cheese is matured for between 14 and 24 months, depending on when the milk was collected.

== Awards ==
- Supreme Champion at the 1996/7 British Cheese Awards
- Best British Cheese at the World Cheese Awards in 2001/2
- Gold Medals at the British Cheese Awards 2003/4 for both Lincolnshire Poacher and Smoked Lincolnshire Poacher

== See also ==
- The Lincolnshire Poacher
- List of smoked foods
