= Sini =

Sini may refer to:

== People ==
=== Given name ===
- Sini (name), a Finnish female given name
- Sini Jose (born 1987), Indian sprinter
- Zeng Sini (born 1988), Chinese cyclist

=== Surname ===
- Fata Sini (born 1966), Samoan rugby footballer
- Linda Sini (1924–1999), Italian actress
- Simone Sini (born 1992), Italian footballer

== Places ==
- Sini, Jharkhand, India
- Sini, Chaharmahal and Bakhtiari, Iran
- Sini, Razavi Khorasan, Iran
- Sini, Sardinia, Italy

== Other uses ==
- Sini (script), a form of Chinese Islamic calligraphy
- Sini (Turkish dining), a communal food tray
- Sarnath International Nyingma Institute
- Sports Institute for Northern Ireland

== See also ==
- Saini, an Indian caste
- Sinai (disambiguation)
