= Lozenge =

Lozenge or losange may refer to:

- Lozenge (shape), a type of rhombus
- Throat lozenge, a tablet intended to be dissolved slowly in the mouth to suppress throat ailments
- Lozenge (heraldry), a diamond-shaped object that can be placed on the field of a shield
- Les Films du Losange, a film production company
- Lauzinaj, also called Lozenge, an Arab sweet
