= Sinikka =

Sinikka is a Finnish female given name. Its nameday is celebrated on 2 September. In Finland, it began to be used in the 1930s, and it reached its peak of popularity in the 1940s and 1950s. As of 2012 there are over 55,000 with this name in Finland. The name Sinikka means blue, and it comes from Sininen, the Finnish word for blue. The name Sini originated as a variant of Sinikka.

Notable people with this name include:

- Sinikka Bohlin, Swedish social democratic politician
- Sinikka Keskitalo, female long-distance runner from Finland
- Sinikka Kukkonen, Finnish orienteering competitor
- Sinikka Kurkinen, Finnish painter
- Sinikka Laine, Finnish author
- Sinikka Langeland, Norwegian singer and musician
- Sinikka Mönkäre (born 1947), Finnish politician
- Sinikka Luja-Penttilä (1924–2023), Finnish politician and writer
- Sinikka Salokorpi (1934–2021), Finnish journalist, non-fiction writer and children's writer
