= Sini (name) =

Sini is a Finnish female given name. Its nameday is celebrated on 2 September. In Finland, it began to be used in the 1930s, and it reached its peak of popularity in the 1980s and 1990s. As of 2012 there are over 9000 women with this name in Finland.

== Origin and variants ==
The name Sini means blue. It originated as a variant of the name Sinikka, which in turn comes from sininen, the Finnish word for blue.

== Notable people ==
Notable people with this name include:

- Sini Anderson, American film director, producer, performance artist and poet
- Sini Häkkinen, Finnish volleyball player
- Sini Latvala, Finnish hammer thrower
