= Algerian baklawa =

Dessert

Baklawa
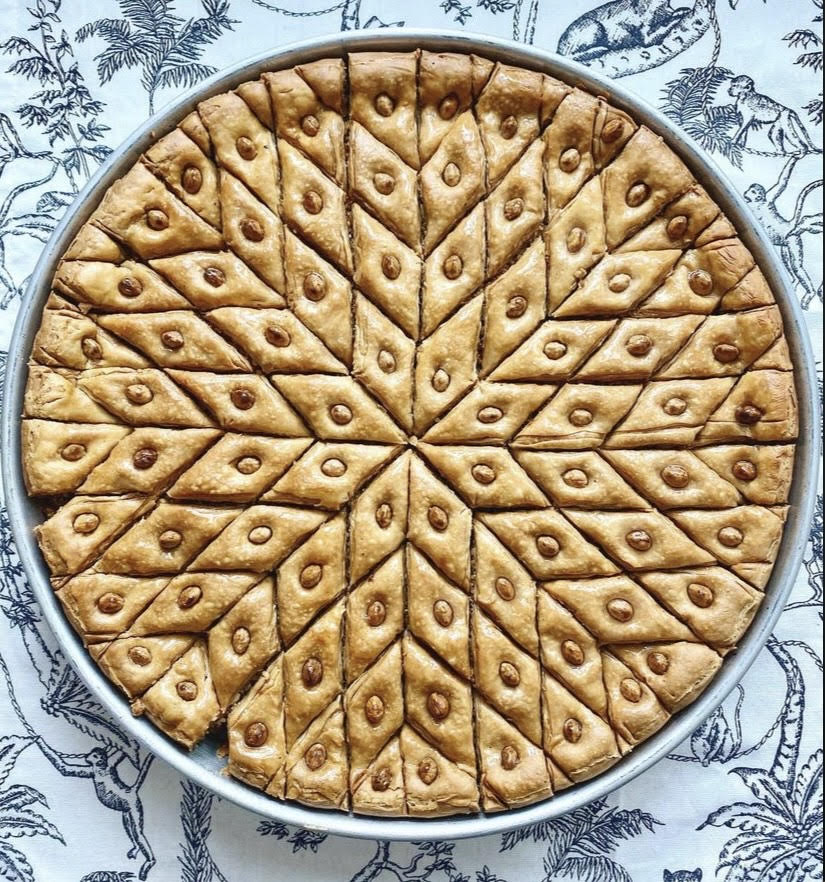
- Alternative names: Beklawa, Baklava
- Course: Dessert

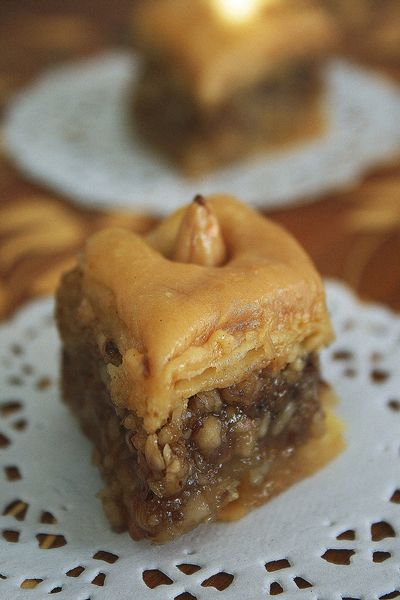
Algerian baklawa

Algerian baklawa, also known as "baklawa algéroise" or "Kaak Warqa", is a version of baklava that is popular in Algeria.

Baklava was introduced to North Africa under the Ottoman Empire, and the Algerian version has continued to evolve into a distinctive style.

In particular, its filling is made with finely ground almonds rather than pistachios or walnuts and orange blossom water is added. The pastry is typically malsouka (also called "warqa") rather than filo.

Like other forms of baklava, the layered pastry is cut into diamond-shaped pieces before being baked. It is then soaked in a syrup of honey, sugar, and sometimes lemon juice.

Algerian baklawa is often served on special occasions and celebrations.
