= Sini (Turkish dining) =

Tray used for serving meals

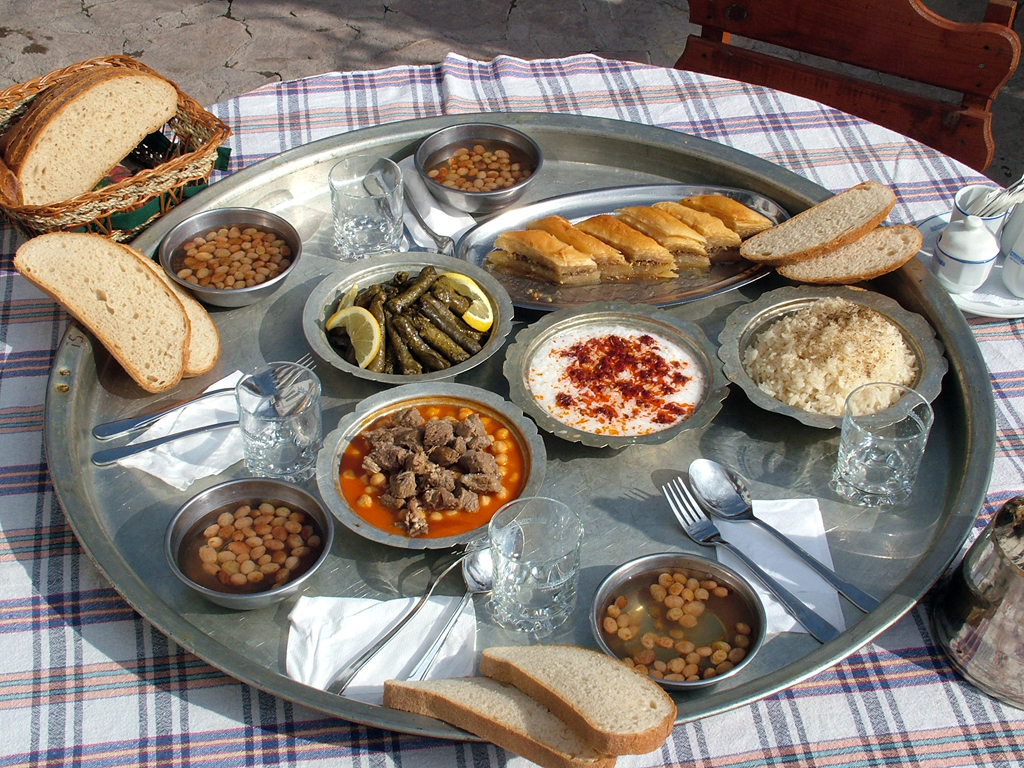
A sini prepared for four diners, containing typical Turkish foods. The four bowls around the edge contain sweet water, or sultana raisins in sweet syrup. Below the sweet water at the top of the tray are stuffed grape leaves and baklava. Further below are peas with beef, yogurt, and rice pilaf.

Sini (Turkish, from Persian سینی sini meaning Large Tray) in common usage, it refers to large round brass or copper tray traditionally used for serving meals, typically to multiple diners.

The tray is typically placed atop a cloth on a sofra, a table-like stand that raises it several inches off the floor, or a kasnak, a similar item that is shaped like a drum without the heads. Foods are arrayed in small metal dishes around the tray. Each diner has a drinking glass, a napkin, and utensils arranged around the circumference of the tray. Diners sit or kneel around the sini, using the utensils to help themselves to the foods. The cloth under the tray is often large enough that diners can put the edges of it on their laps, where it acts as a napkin.

Turkish-themed restaurants in Turkey and elsewhere sometimes use the word "Sini" in their names, to associate themselves with these trays and the joys of traditional Turkish dining.
