= Baklava =

Layered filo pastry dessert

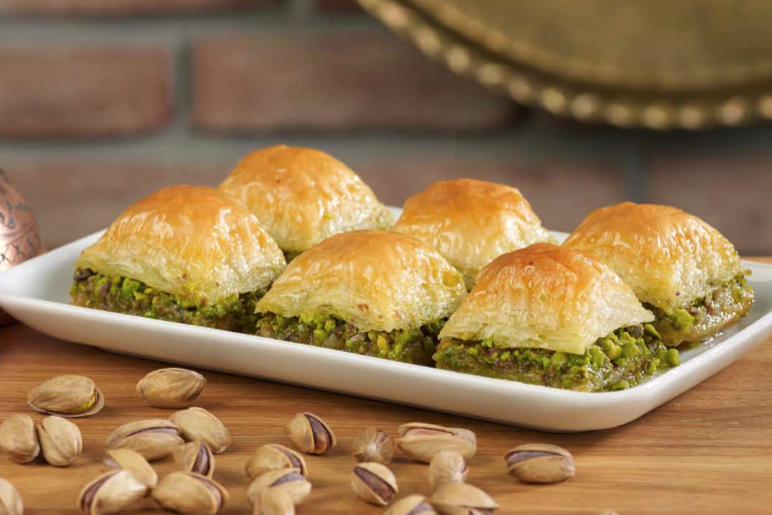
- Pistachio baklava from Gaziantep, Turkey
- Course: Dessert
- Region or state: Southeast Europe, North Africa, West Asia and Central Asia
- Serving temperature: Cold, room temperature or re-warmed
- Main ingredients: Filo pastry, nuts, syrup
- Variations: Multiple

Baklava (/bɑːkləˈvɑː, ˈbɑːkləvɑː/, or /bəˈklɑːvə/) is a layered pastry dessert made of filo pastry, filled with chopped nuts, and sweetened with either syrup or honey.

There are several theories for the origin of this pastry, but it is considered a traditional dessert among the cuisines of countries in West Asia, Southeast Europe, Central Asia, and North Africa.

== Etymology ==
The word baklava is first attested in English in 1650, a borrowing from Ottoman Turkish: باقلاوه /bɑːklɑvɑː/. The name baklava is used in many languages with minor phonetic and spelling variations. A poem attributed to the 14th-15th century poet Kaygusuz Abdal contains a reference to "two hundred trays of baklava", some filled with almonds and others with lentils. According to food historian Priscilla Mary Işın this is the earliest literary reference to the word baklava.

Although the word baklava and related forms are attested in Turkish, Persian, Arabic and other languages, the ultimate linguistic origin of baklava has not been established and its etymology remains inconclusive. Several scholars have proposed a Turkic origin, but the available etymological explanations and linguistic evidence do not corroborate the Turkic origin hypothesis. The historian Paul D. Buell has proposed that the word baklava may come from the Mongolian root baγla- 'to tie, wrap up, pile up' composed with the Turkic verbal ending -v. The Mongolian root itself has been identified as a possible borrowing from Turkic. Linguist Mateusz Urban considers the further etymology problematic. Although he regards Buell's proposal as semantically plausible, he questions it on phonological grounds: Mongolic γ would not normally be expected to correspond to Turkic k, for which the expected reflex would be ġ (modern Turkish ğ). He also notes that Buell's hypothesis does not explain the final -a in baklava. Lexicographer Sevan Nişanyan identifies baklağı and baklağu as early forms of the word, but his etymological dictionary explicitly describes their origin as uncertain. Another form of the word is also recorded in Persian, باقلبا (bāqlabā). Though the suffix -vā might suggest a Persian origin, the baqla- part does not appear to be Persian and remains of unknown origin. The Arabic name بقلاوة baqlāwa originates from Turkish.

== History ==
Baklava shop, between 19 April 1921 and 6 December 1923, from Frank Scholten's La Porte d'entrée Jaffa

The imperial kitchens of the Topkapı Palace in Constantinople (modern-day Istanbul) have sometimes been credited with shaping the baklava familiar today, during the Ottoman Empire. Although Ottoman kitchen records document the preparation of baklava at the palace as early as 878 AH (1473–74), its place of origin remains uncertain, as the available records do not establish where or how its modern form developed.

The early history of baklava remains contested. There are several proposals for the original roots of baklava like the Greek placenta cake, the medieval Arabic confection lauzinaj, and the Central Asian tradition of layered yufka.

There are also some similarities between baklava and the Ancient Greek desserts gastris (γάστρις), kopte sesamis (κοπτὴ σησαμίς), and kopton (κοπτόν) found in book XIV of the Deipnosophistae. The recipe for gastris in Book XIV of Athenaeus’ Deipnosophistae describes a mixture of nuts, poppy seeds, honey, and pepper, shaped into a square. It then instructs the cook to prepare white sesame with boiled honey and to stretch out two lagania (λαγάνιον, i.e. a thin broad cake), placing one underneath the filling and the other on top.

The Ottoman Sultan presented trays of baklava to the Janissaries every 15th of the month of Ramadan in a ceremonial procession called the Baklava Alayı.

=== Placenta cake ===
Many claim that the placenta cake, and therefore baklava, derived from a recipe from Ancient Greece. Homer's Odyssey, written around 800 BC, mentions thin breads sweetened with walnuts and honey. In the fifth century BC, Philoxenos states in his poem "Dinner" that, in the final drinking course of a meal, hosts would prepare and serve cheesecake made with milk and honey that was baked into a pie.

The word "placenta" originally comes from the Greek language plakous (πλακοῦς), which means something "flat and broad". An early Greek language mention of plakous as a dessert (or second table delicacy) comes from the poems of Archestratos from the 5th century BC. He describes plakous as served with nuts or dried fruits and commends the honey-drenched Athenian version of plakous. The earliest known detailed recipe for placenta, from the 2nd century BC, is a honey-covered baked layered-dough dessert which food historian Patrick Faas identifies as the origin of baklava.

In the Byzantine Empire, the traditional placenta cake (known as "koptoplakous", κοπτοπλακοῦς), a dish similar to baklava, was consumed.

According to a number of scholars, koptoplakous (κοπτοπλακοῦς) was a precursor to the modern baklava. Historian Speros Vryonis describes koptoplakous as a "Byzantine favorite" and "the same as the Turkish baklava", as do other writers. The name plakous (Greek: πλακοῦς) is used today on the island of Lesbos for thin layered pastry leaves with crushed nuts, baked, and covered in syrup.

=== Lauzinaj ===
Baklava is a common dessert in modern Arab cuisines, but the Arabic language cookbook Kitāb al-Ṭabīkh, compiled by Ibn Sayyar al-Warraq in the 10th century, does not contain any recipe for baklava. Its recipe for lauzinaj refers to small pieces of almond paste wrapped in very thin pastry ("as thin as grasshoppers' wings") and drenched in syrup. Some writers say that this is the dessert that most closely resembles the modern baklava. Charles Perry, however, has written that "it was not much like baklava".

There are similar recipes for lauzinaj in the 13th-century Kitab al-Tabikh by Muhammad bin Hasan al-Baghdadi. Written in 1226 in today's Iraq, the cookbook was based on an earlier collection of 9th century Persian-inspired recipes. According to Gil Marks, Middle Eastern pastry makers later developed the process of layering the ingredients.

== Preparation ==
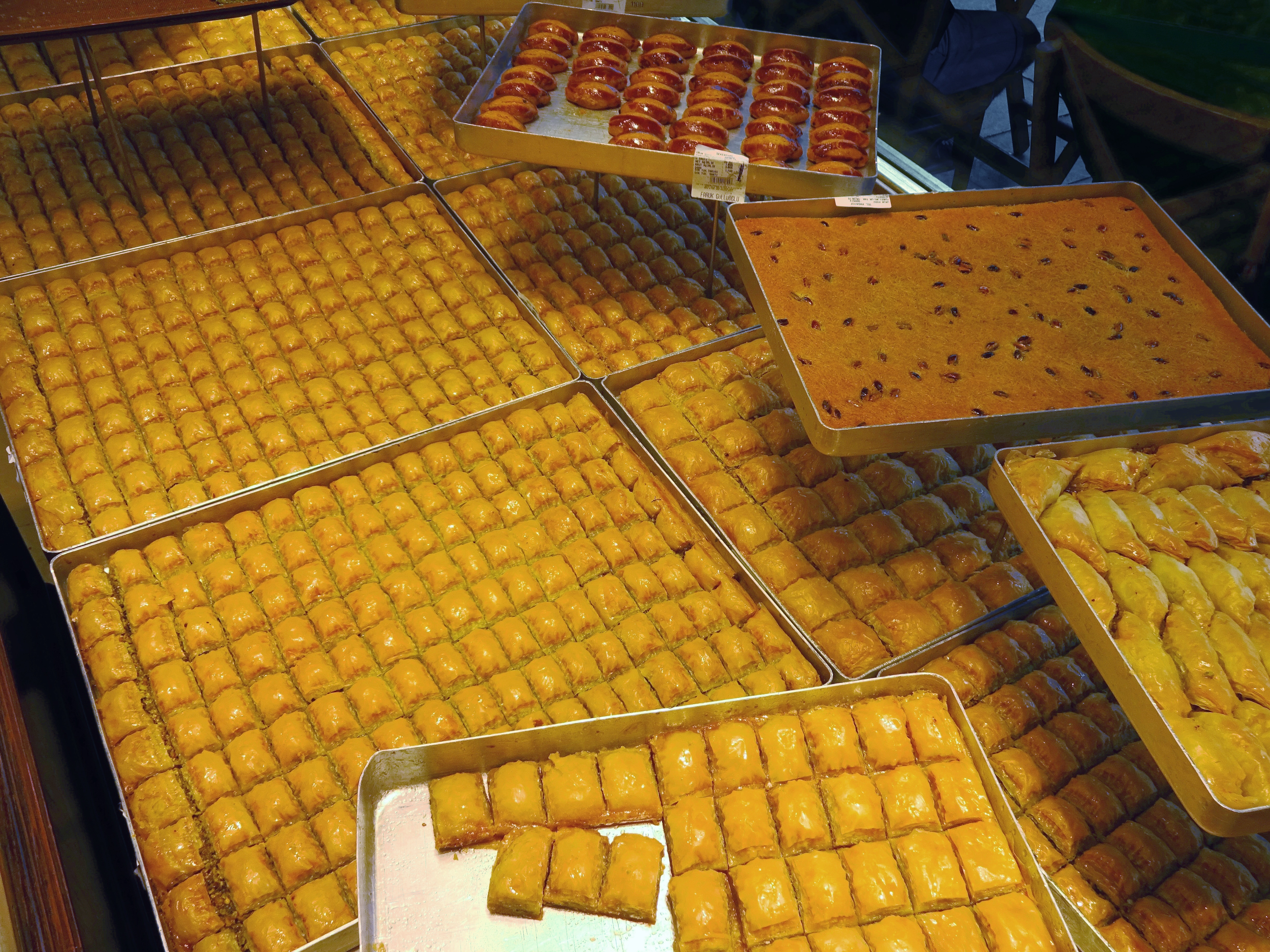
Large baking sheets are used for preparing baklava.

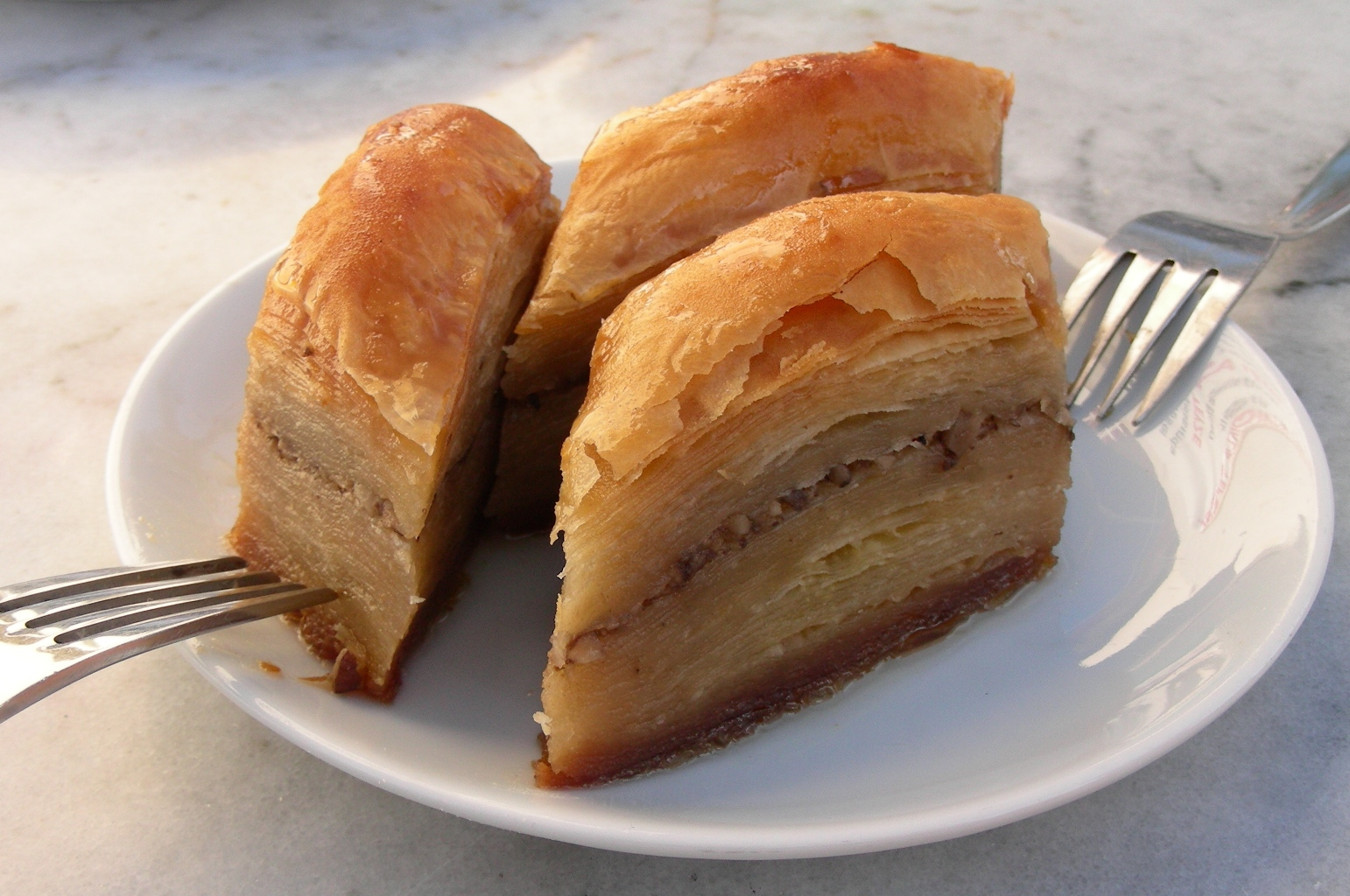
Baklava cut in a lozenge shape

Baklava is prepared in large pans of various shapes. Multiple layers of filo dough are separated from each other by melted butter and starch that gives baklava its unique texture. During the layering process, finely chopped nuts—typically walnuts or pistachios, occasionally hazelnuts and almonds—are added partway through the layers. Most recipes have multiple layers of filo and nuts, though some have the pastry only at the top and the bottom.

Before baking, the dough is cut into regular pieces, often parallelograms (lozenge-shaped), triangles, diamonds or rectangles. After baking, a syrup, which may include honey, rosewater, or orange flower water, is poured over the cooked baklava and allowed to soak. The parallelograms are separated into individual pastries after baking.

Baklava is usually served at room temperature, and is often garnished with nuts that have been ground up.

== Regional variations ==
=== Armenia ===
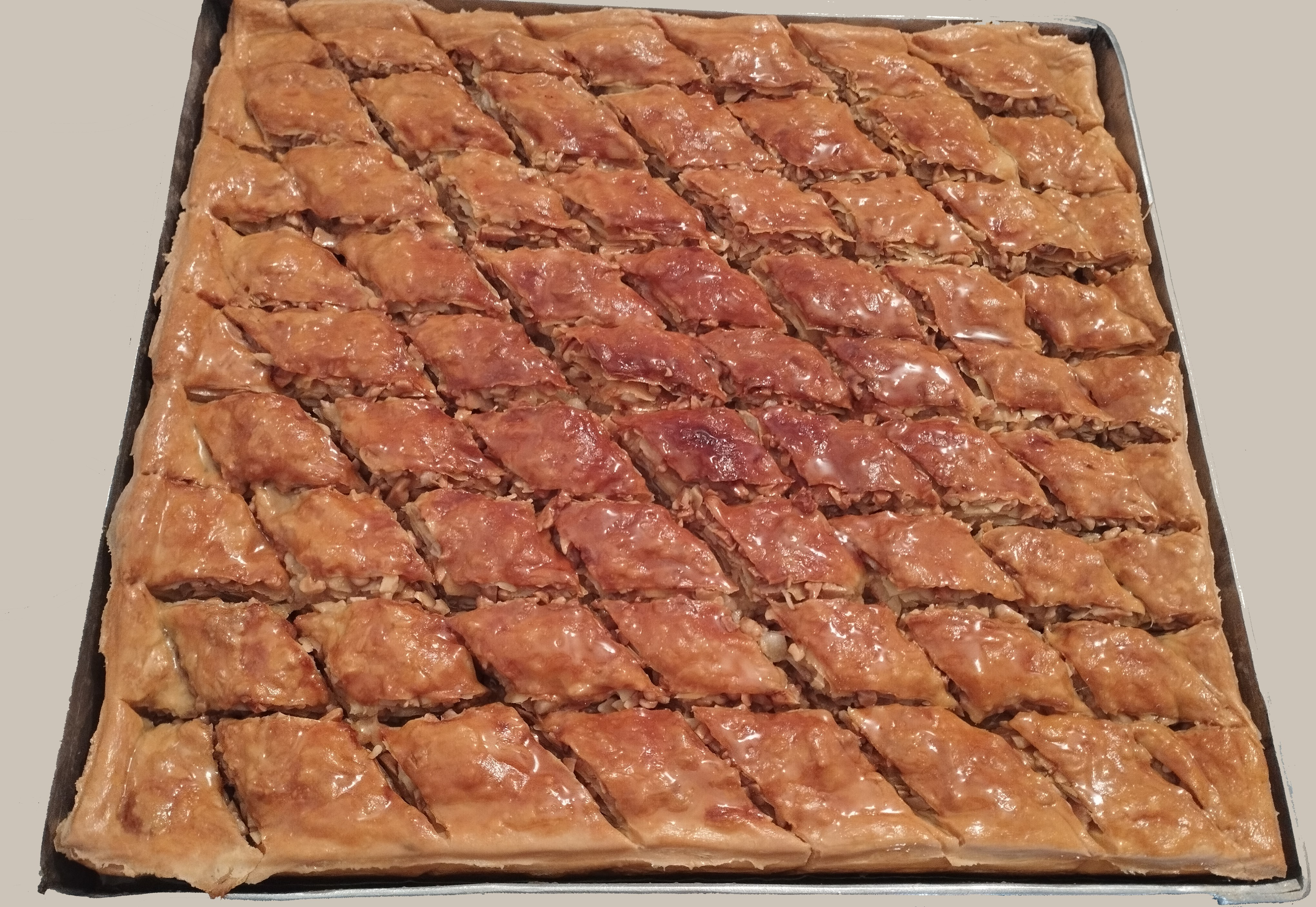
Armenian Gavar pakhlava

Armenian baklava, (Armenian: Փախլավա, romanized: pakhlava) is made of layers of filo dough, a filling of cinnamon-spiced chopped walnuts, and a syrup made from cloves, cinnamon, lemon juice, sugar and water. It is diamond-shaped and often has either one hazelnut, almond, or half a walnut placed on each piece. It is often served at special occasions like Armenian Christmas or Armenian Easter.

Armenian baklava has some variations on how many filo layers are supposed to be used. One variation uses 40 sheets of dough to align with the 40 days of Lent that Jesus spent in the desert where he fasted. Another variation is similar to the Greek style of baklava, which is supposed to be made with 33 dough layers, referring to the years of Jesus's life.

The city of Gavar makes its own version of baklava. It is made with 25 dough layers, has a filling of cleaned and dried chopped walnuts and sugar, and a syrup that is poured over the finished baklava consisting of honey and flowers. This type of baklava used to be prepared in the then-Armenian city of Bayazet, but the people living there immigrated to Gavar and surrounding regions in 1830.

The tradition of pakhlava preparation in Kyavar (Gavar) is included in the intangible cultural heritage list of Armenia.

=== Greece ===
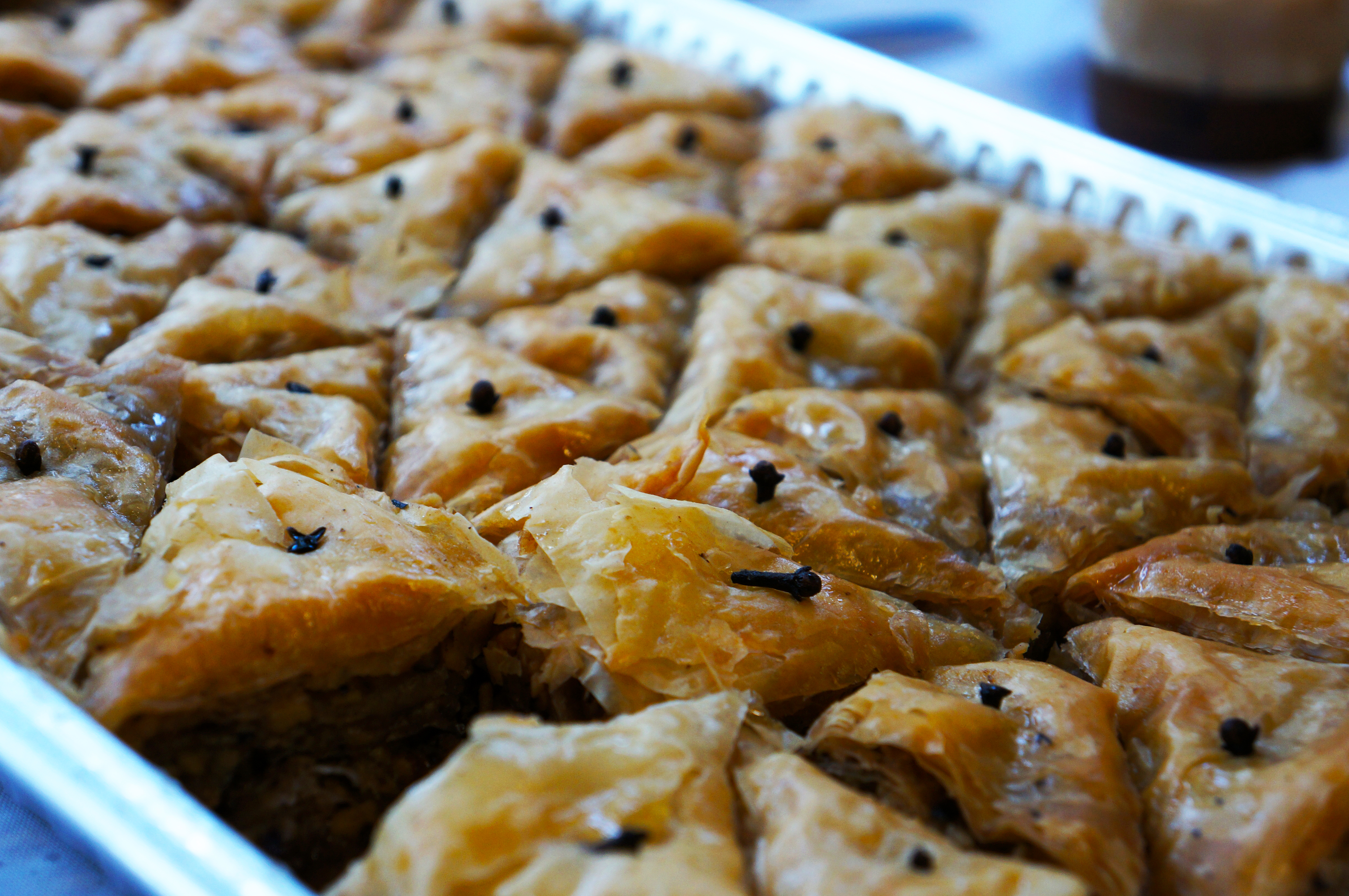
Greek baklava

Greek baklava (Greek: Μπακλαβάς) comes in many regional guises, with different names such as samousades, zournadakia, and masourakia. In Greek cuisine, walnuts are more common than pistachios and the dessert is flavored with cinnamon. Generally speaking, in southern Greece baklava is mostly made with chopped almonds and in the north with walnuts. Some recipes use hazelnuts, sesame, or even raisins. The syrup is made of sugar, honey, water, cinnamon, and orange or lemon zest and juice. Greek baklava is supposed to be made with 33 filo dough layers, referring to the years of Jesus's life.

On the island of Lesbos in Greece, a type of baklava is still known as plakous (Greek: πλακοῦς), which is the name of an Ancient Greek pastry that is seen as the predecessor of baklava. The latter is a baked dessert with very thinly made pastry layers and chopped nuts. The base for this modern placenta is made with leaves of filo dough, and nuts stacked upon each other. After baking, it is soaked in simple syrup and sprinkled with cinnamon.

=== Iran ===
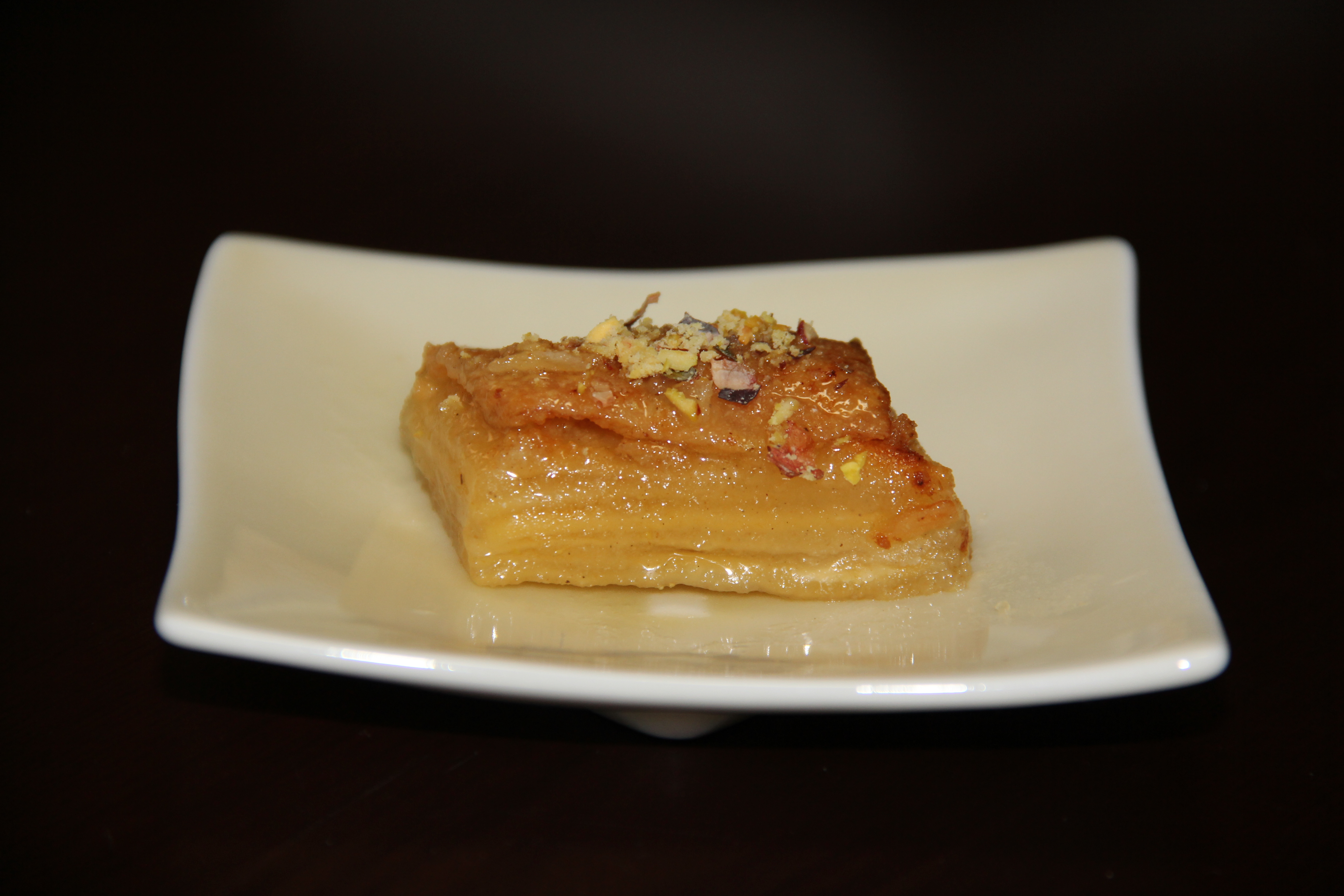
Iranian baklava

Iranian baklava (Persian: باقلوا) is less crisp and uses less syrup than other baklava variations. The cities of Yazd, Tabriz, Qazvin, Kashan, and the Gilan province are famous for their baklava variations, which are widely distributed in Iran. Iranian baklava uses a combination of chopped almonds, hazelnuts, or walnuts and pistachios spiced with saffron, cardamom, or jasmine. For the syrup, rose water, lemon juice, sugar, honey, and water are used. Iranian baklava may be cut into diamonds or squares. When it is finished, it is often garnished with chopped pistachios, rose petals, jasmine or coconut powder depending on the region.

=== Turkey ===
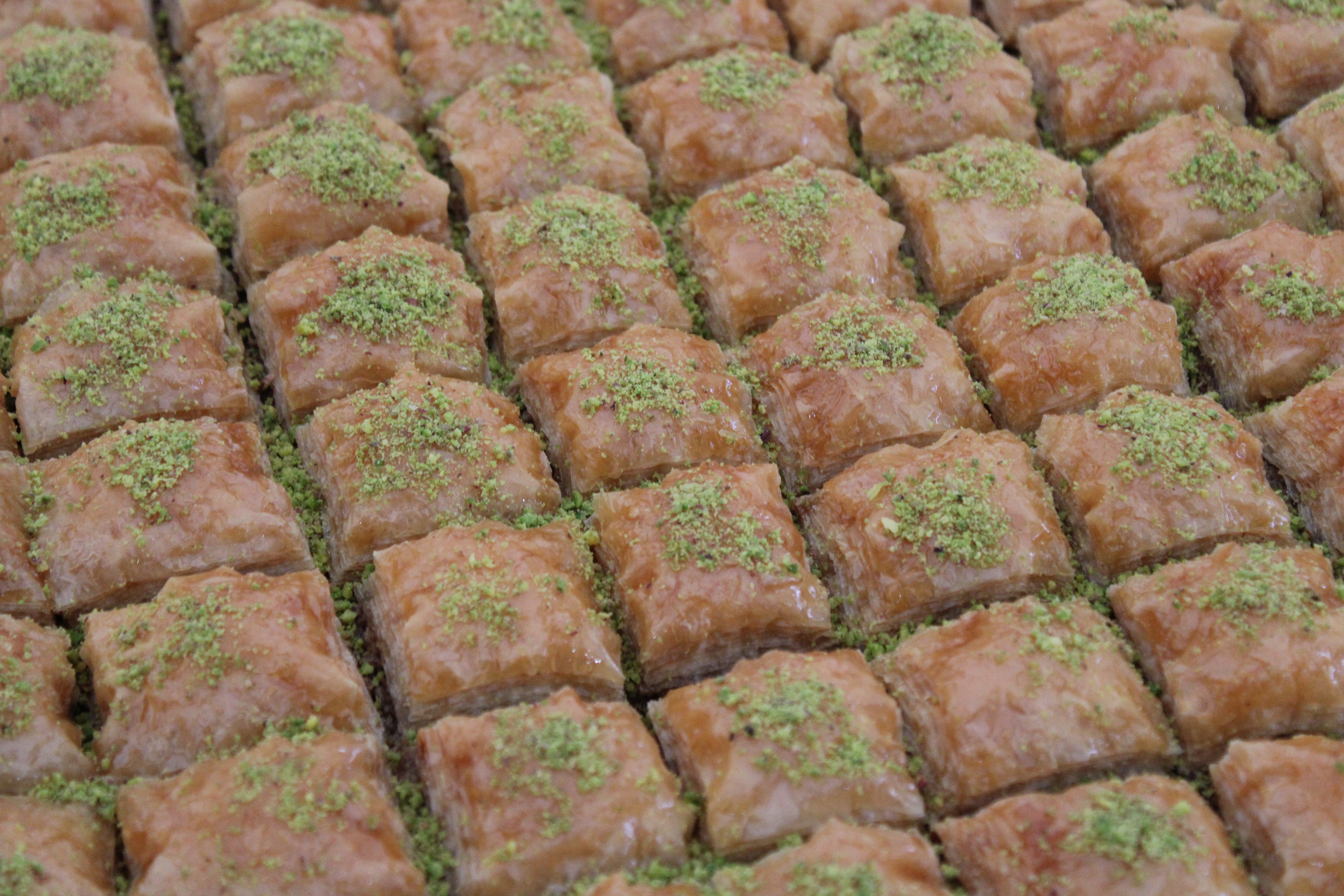
Turkish baklava

In Turkish cuisine, baklava is traditionally filled with pistachios, walnuts, or almonds (in some parts of the Aegean Region). In the Black Sea Region, hazelnuts are commonly used as a filling for baklava. Hazelnuts are also used as a filling for the Turkish dessert Sütlü Nuriye, a lighter version of the dessert which substitutes milk for the simple syrup used in traditional baklava recipes. Midye Baklava is a mussel-shaped baklava filled with nuts. Pistachio sarma baklava is a green rolled baklava with ground pistachio butter filling. Şöbiyet is a variation that includes kaymak as the filling, in addition to the traditional nuts.

The city of Gaziantep in south-central Turkey is famous for its baklava made from locally grown pistachios, often served with kaymak cream. The dessert was introduced to Gaziantep in 1871 by Çelebi Güllü, who had learned the recipe from a Syrian chef in Damascus. In 2008, the Turkish patent office registered a geographical indication for Antep Baklava, and in 2013, Antep Baklavası or Gaziantep Baklavası was registered as a Protected Geographical Indication by the European Commission. Gaziantep baklava is the first Turkish product to receive a protected designation from the European Commission.

=== Other Balkan nations ===
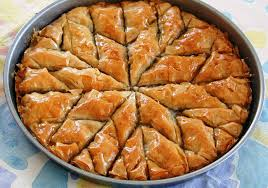
Albanian baklava

Albanians usually prepare the baklava for certain religious Sunni Muslim, Catholic Christian, or Orthodox Christian holidays, and they popularly prepare it for the winter holiday season and the New Year as part of Albanian cuisine.

In Bosnian cuisine, ružice is the name of the regional variant of baklava.

Baklava also exists in Romanian cuisine, being known as baclava in Romanian. It is one of the most preferred desserts among Romanians together with kanafeh (cataif) and sarailia. In Romania, some pastry shops that sell baklava have notable popularity. They are common in the south and southeast of the country, but some also exist in its east. In Bulgaria, baklava is very popular during the winter holiday season, when people have it for dessert after dinner.

=== The Levant ===
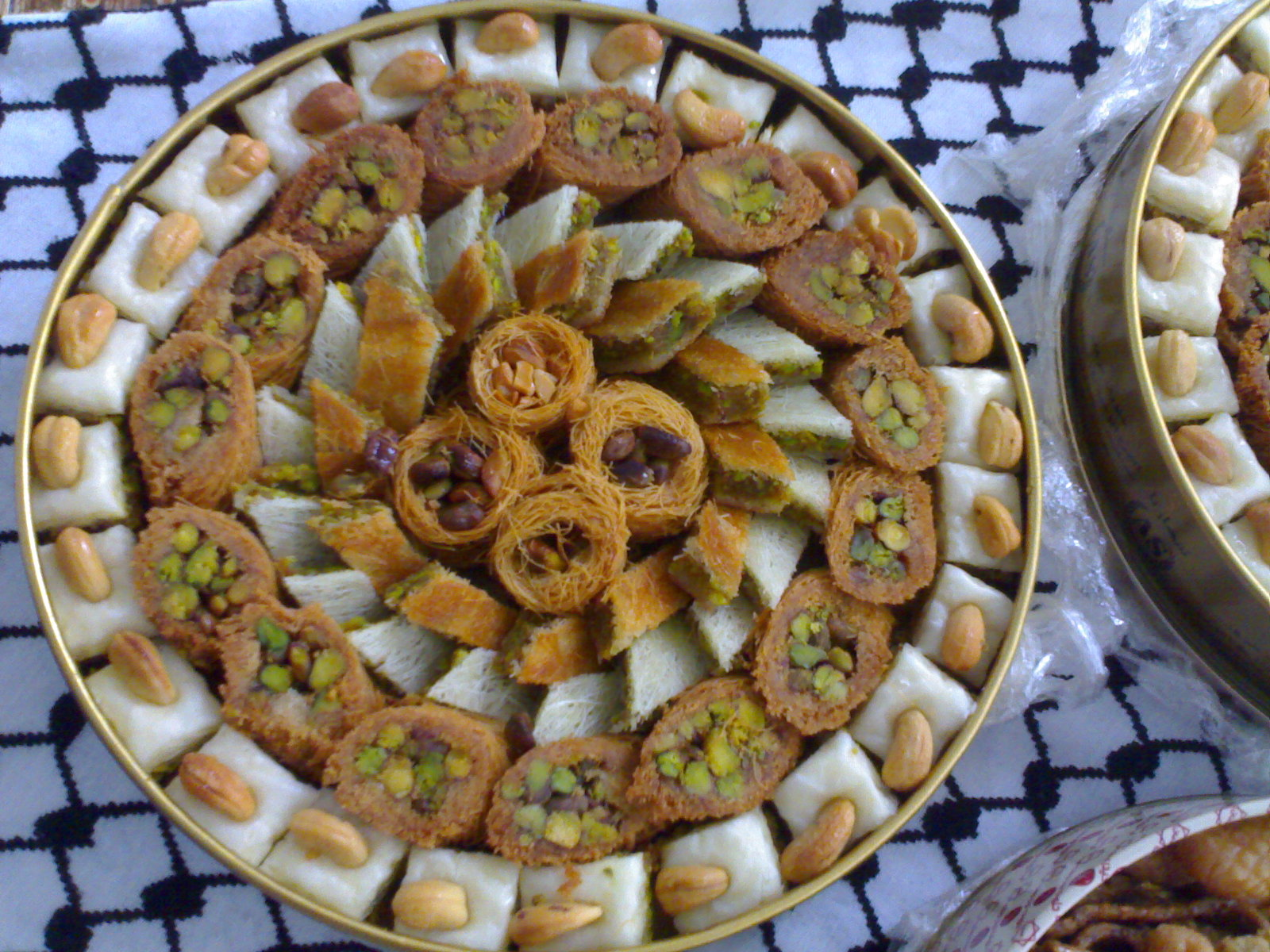
Palestinian baklawa, from edge to center: Regular filo pastry baklava, bourma, balluriyeh, and birds nest baklava

In Syrian cuisine, baklava (Arabic: البقلاوة, Classical Syriac: ܒܩܠܘܐ) or warbat (Arabic: وربات), is a dessert mostly served on special occasions like Eid al-Fitr or Syrian Christmas. Syrian baklava is made of 24 layers of buttered filo dough, a filling of either chopped pistachios or chopped walnuts and a syrup consisting of sugar, orange blossom water, and lemon juice. Syrian baklava comes in many shapes, but the diamond shape is the most common one. Syrian warbat consists of layers of filo dough filled with a semolina based custard, though it is sometimes also filled with pistachios, walnuts, almonds, or sweet cheese. The dessert is topped with a sweet syrup made from sugar, water, and lemon juice brought to a boil and then left to cool and thicken. A Syrian baklava recipe was introduced to the Turkish city of Gaziantep in 1871 by Çelebi Güllü, who had learned the recipe from a chef in the city of Damascus which transformed into the Gaziantep baklava we know today. The butter used in Syrian baklava is a type of dairy-based clarified butter or ghee called samneh.

"Baklava" is also used as a generic term for a selection of sweets made with filo pastry or kadayif (knafeh) to make confections like balluriyeh (layered), bourma (rolled), and bulbul's nest (nest-shaped).

Syrian and Lebanese baklava is traditionally flavored with rose water. Kul wa-shkur (Arabic: كل واشكر, lit. 'eat and give thanks') is a variety of baklava made in Syria and Lebanon by folding filo sheets around a nut filling.

=== Algeria ===
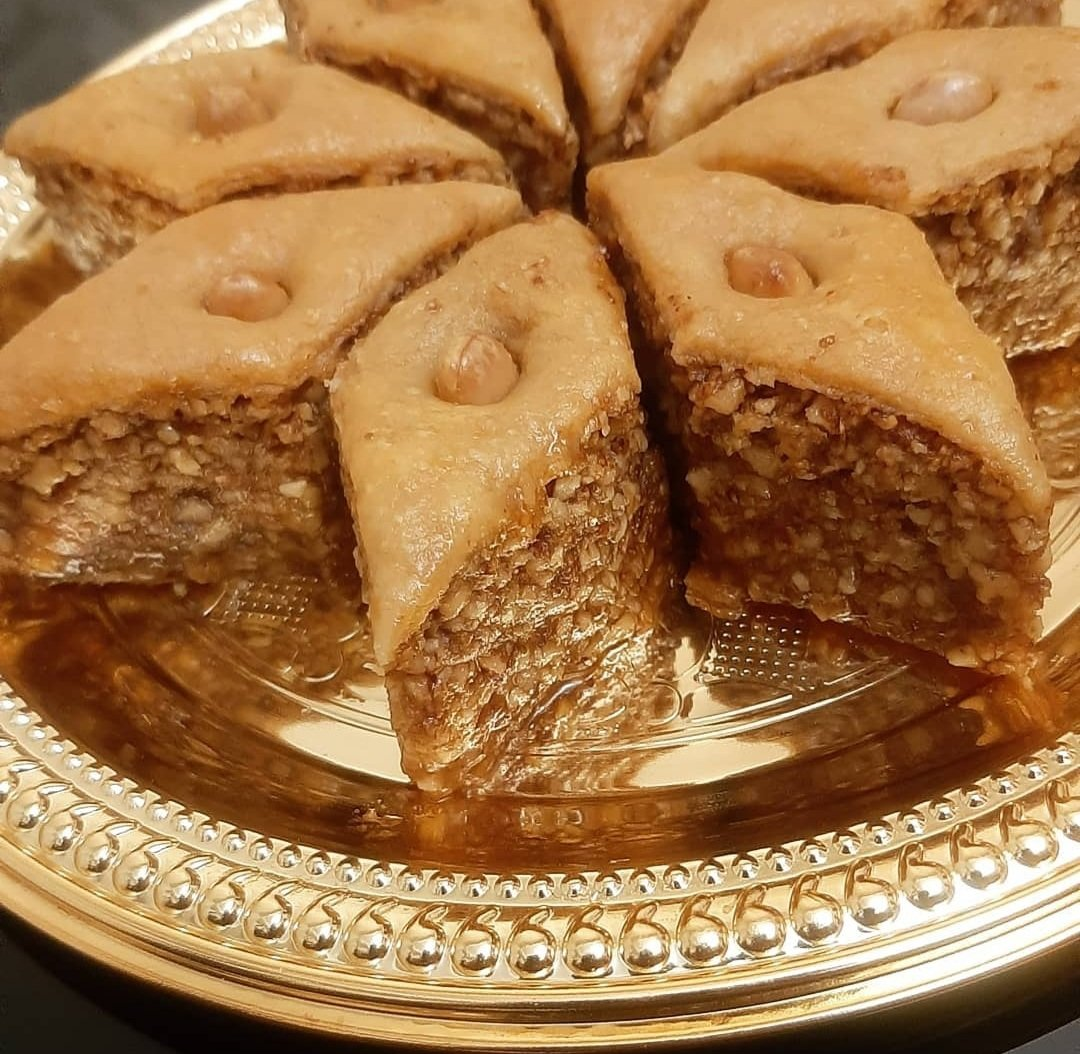
Algerian baklawa

Baklava in Algeria is called baklawa (Arabic: بقلاوة, Tifinagh: ⴱⴰⴽⵍⴰⴹⴰ). In most Algerian regions, baklava is the centerpiece of any sweets table. This type of baklava originates in the Algerian city of Constantine. The Algerian baklava is distinct in that filo dough is not used. Instead, they use another type of thin dough called malsouka or warqa and, instead of walnuts or pistachios, they use almonds.

Like other forms of baklava, the layered pastry is cut into diamond-shaped pieces and has one almond placed on top of each piece before being baked. It is then soaked in a syrup of honey, sugar, and lemon juice.

=== Azerbaijan ===
Azerbaijani baklava (Azerbaijani: Azərbaycan paxlavası) is made mostly for special occasions (like Nowruz). Pastry, cardamom, and saffron are used for the preparation. Nuts (mostly hazelnuts, almonds, or walnuts) and sugar are used as the filling, and syrup is used as a sweetener. Ethnic groups native to different regions (like Lezgins and Tat people) have contributed to some regional variations. Tenbel pakhlava is filled with almonds or walnuts and consists of 8-10 layers. Its top layer is coated with yolk. Half a walnut is placed on each diamond-shaped piece. Ganja pakhlava has a filling of almond, sugar, and cardamom. 18 layers of dough are used. Rose petals are added to the dough. Guba pakhlava has a top layer that is coated with saffron. It uses 50 rishta layers. Sheki pakhlava, or Sheki halva, is made from rishta (dough made from rice flour), filling (hazelnut, cardamom), and syrup.

Charles Perry notes that the Azerbaijanis also make an archaic type of pastry where 7 layers of sweetened ground nuts separate 8 layers. This is called Bakï pakhlavasï (Baku-style baklava) and is made from noodle paste rather than filo. He posits that this may even be representative of the 'earliest form of baklava' as developed by Turkish nomads combining the filling of nuts with their layered bread.

=== Uzbek and Tatar ===
Uzbek cuisine has pakhlava, puskal, or yupka, or in Tatar yoka, which are sweet and salty savories (börekler) prepared with 10–12 layers of dough. In Crimean Tatar cuisine, the pakhlava is their variant of baklava.

=== Other ===
There are many variants of Baklava in Maghrebi cuisine that are eaten to this day. Owing to its ancient origins, Assyrian people today continue to enjoy baklava and eat it as part of their larger cuisine.

== Gallery ==
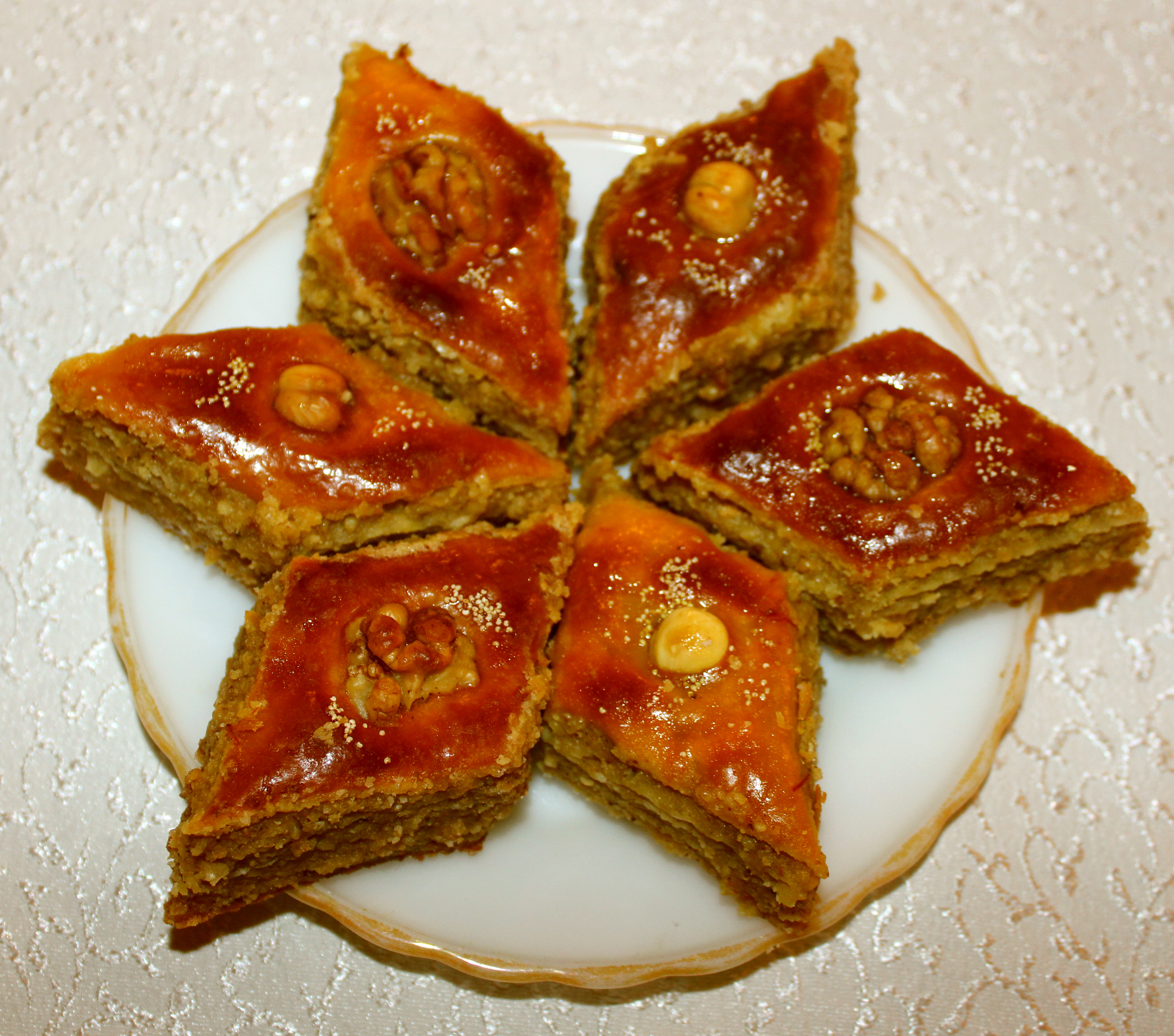
Ganja pakhlava

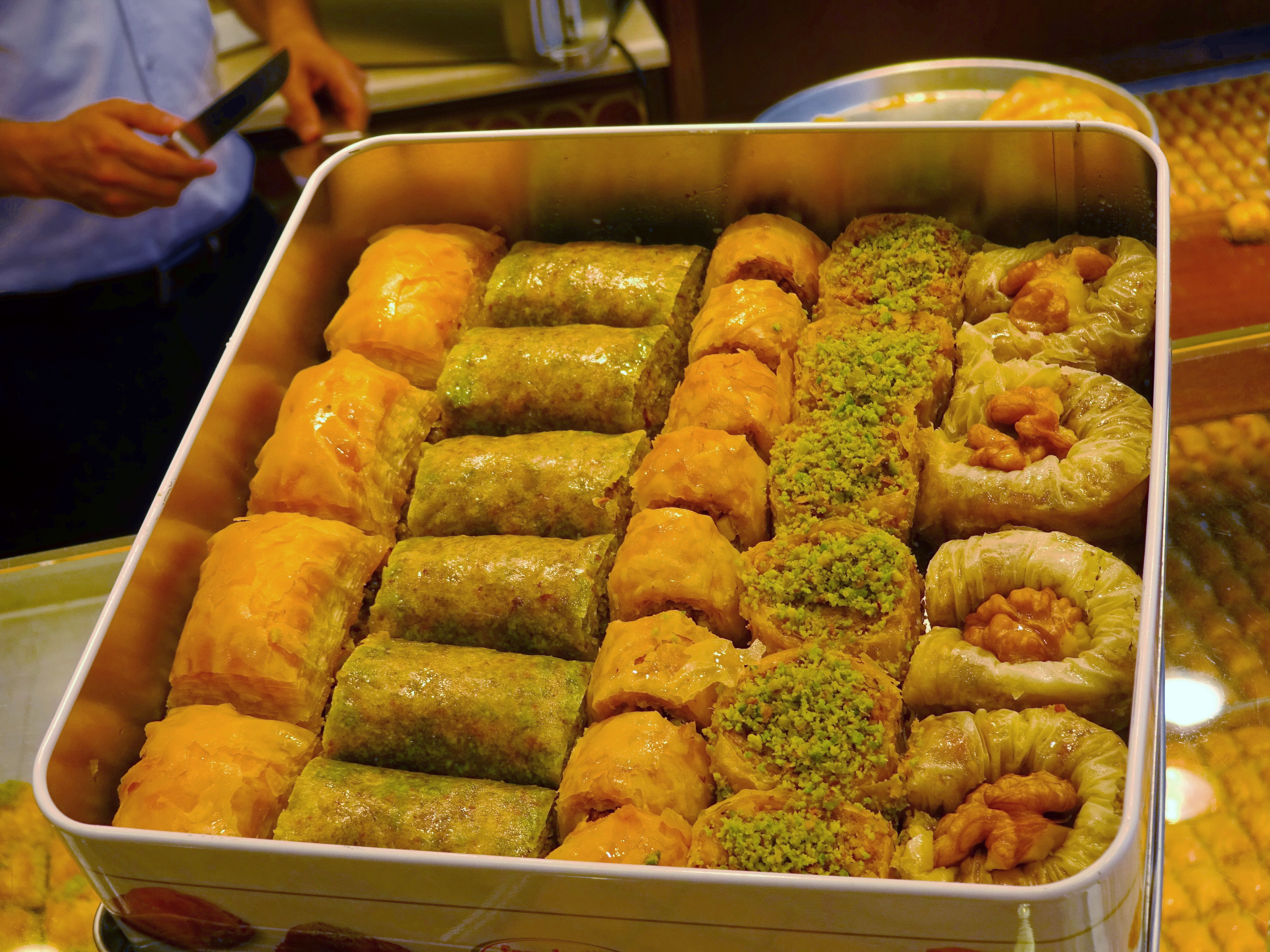
Several types of Baklava in Istanbul, sarma baklava can be seen (second from left)

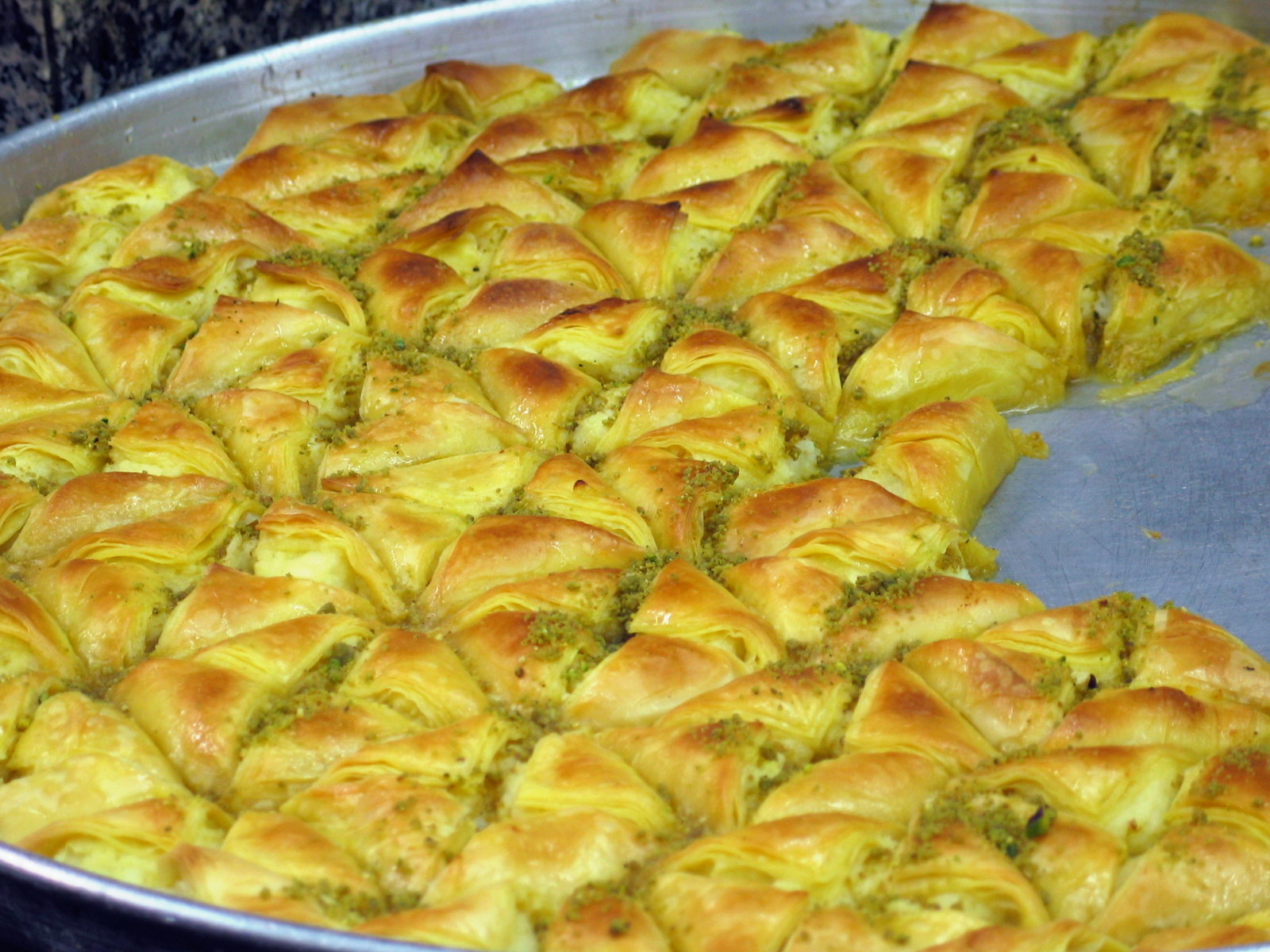
A tray of baklava in the Old City, Jerusalem

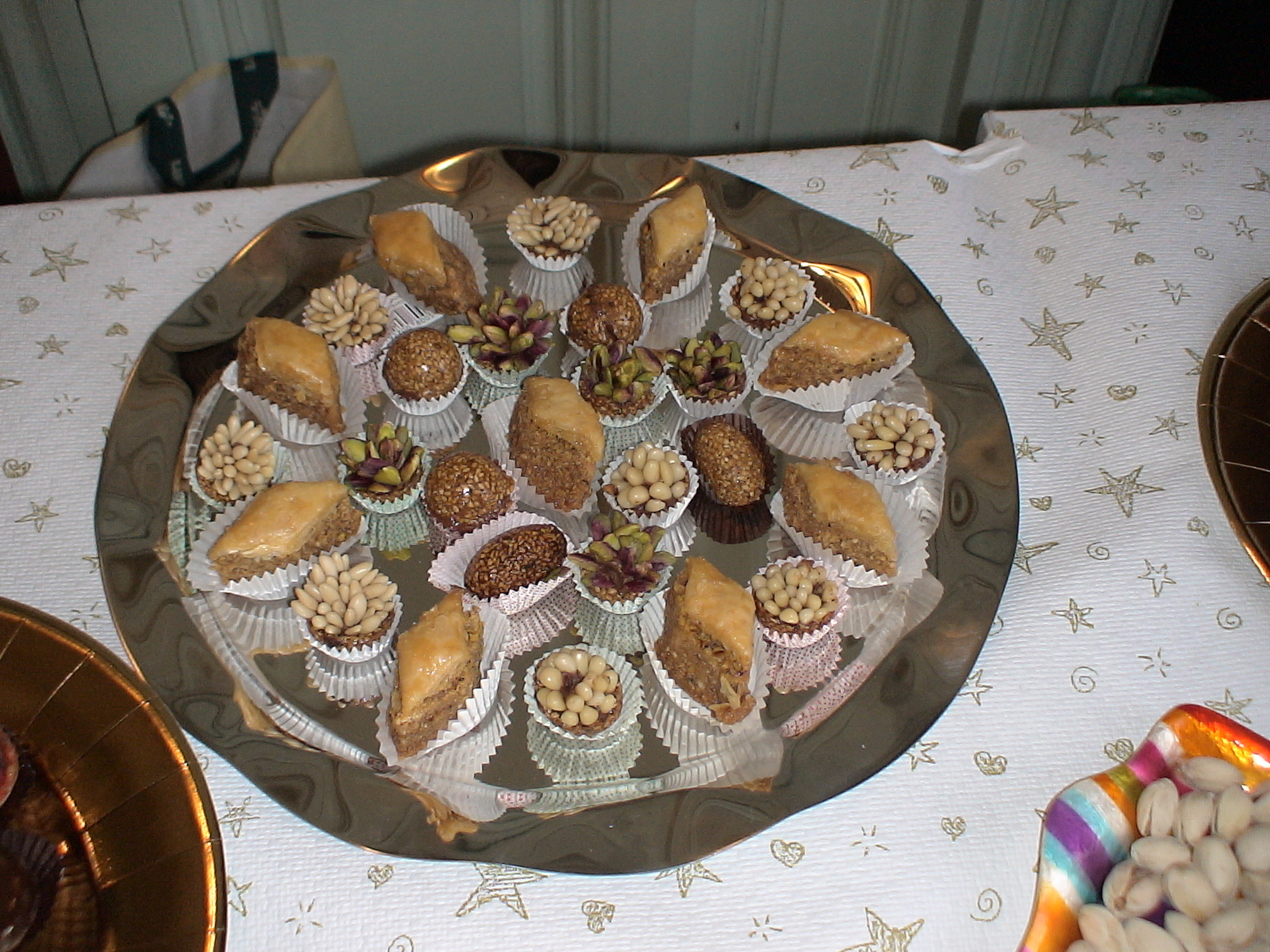
A tray of Tunisian pastries including baklava

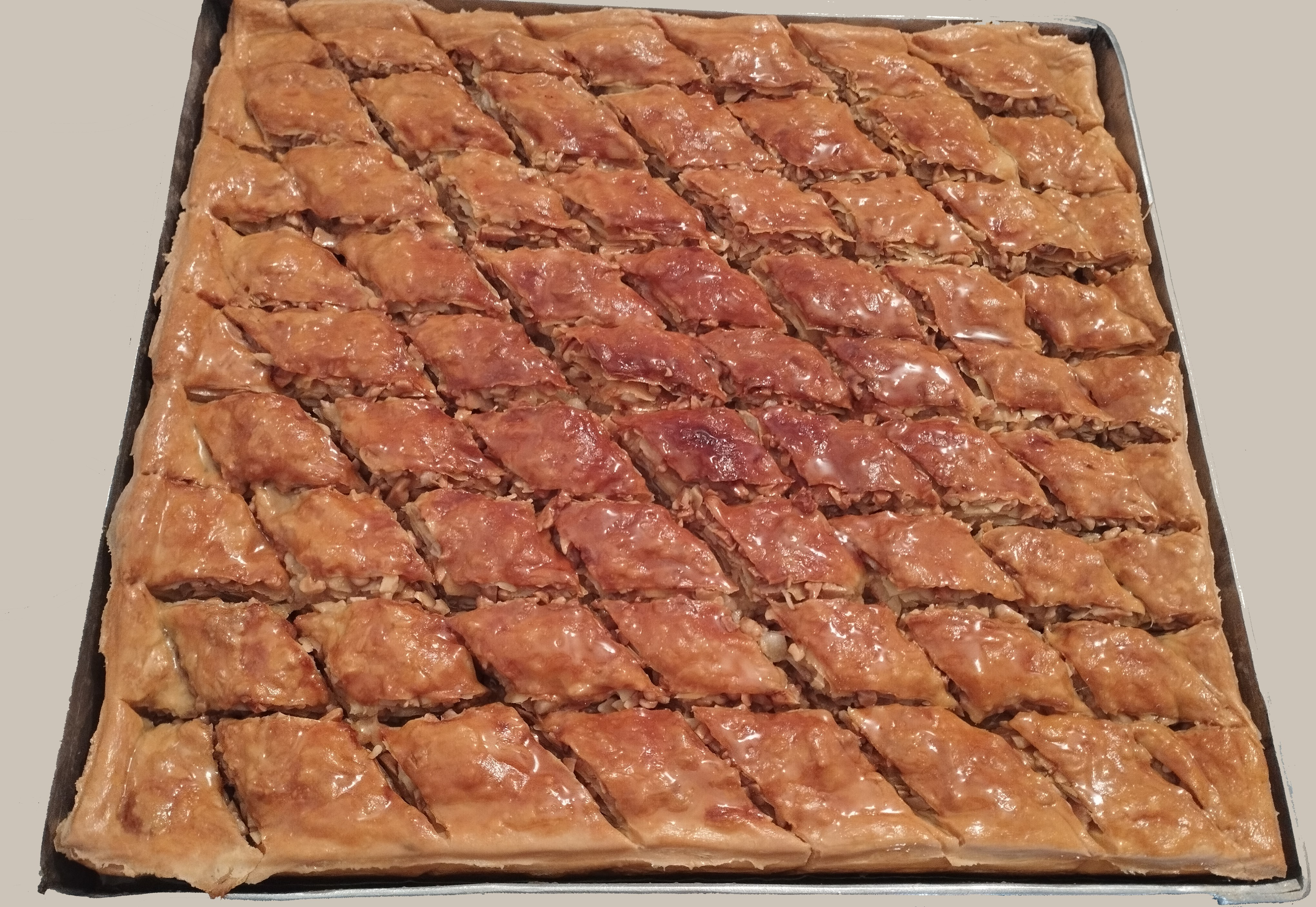
Armenian gavar baklava

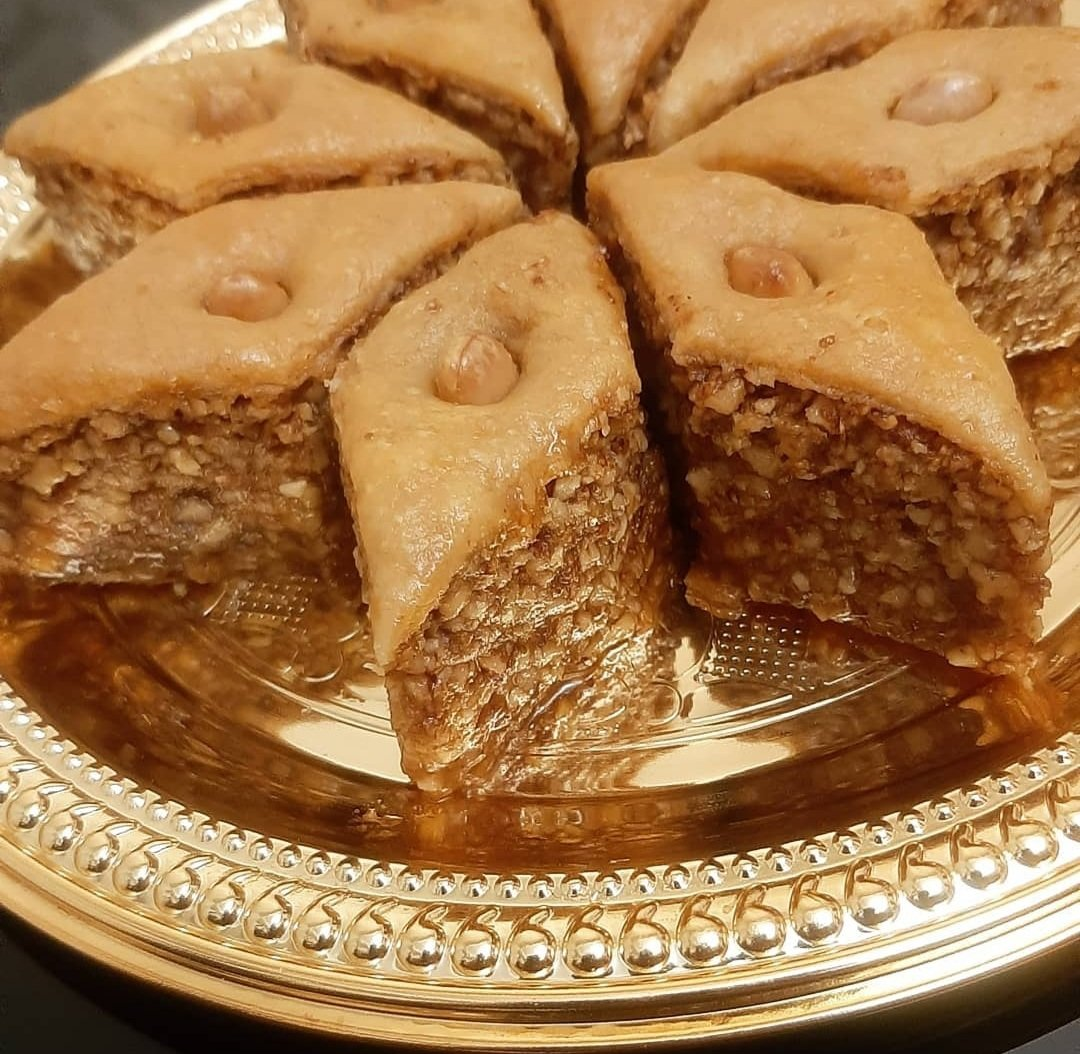
Algerian baklawa served during Eid

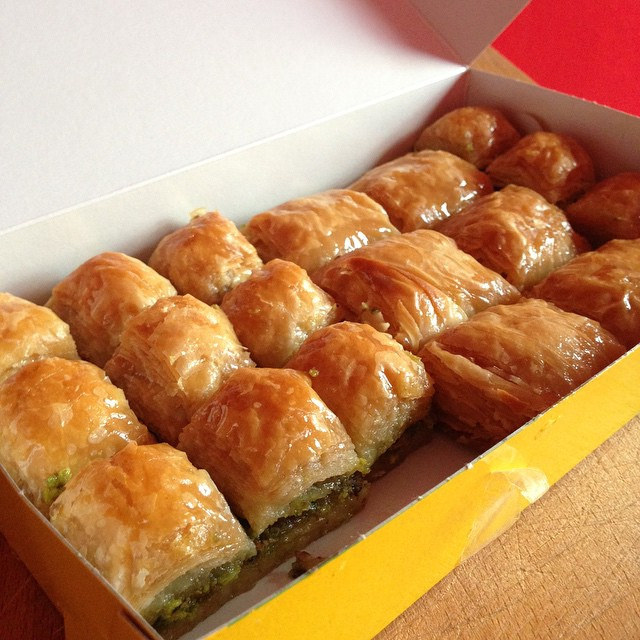
Gaziantep baklava

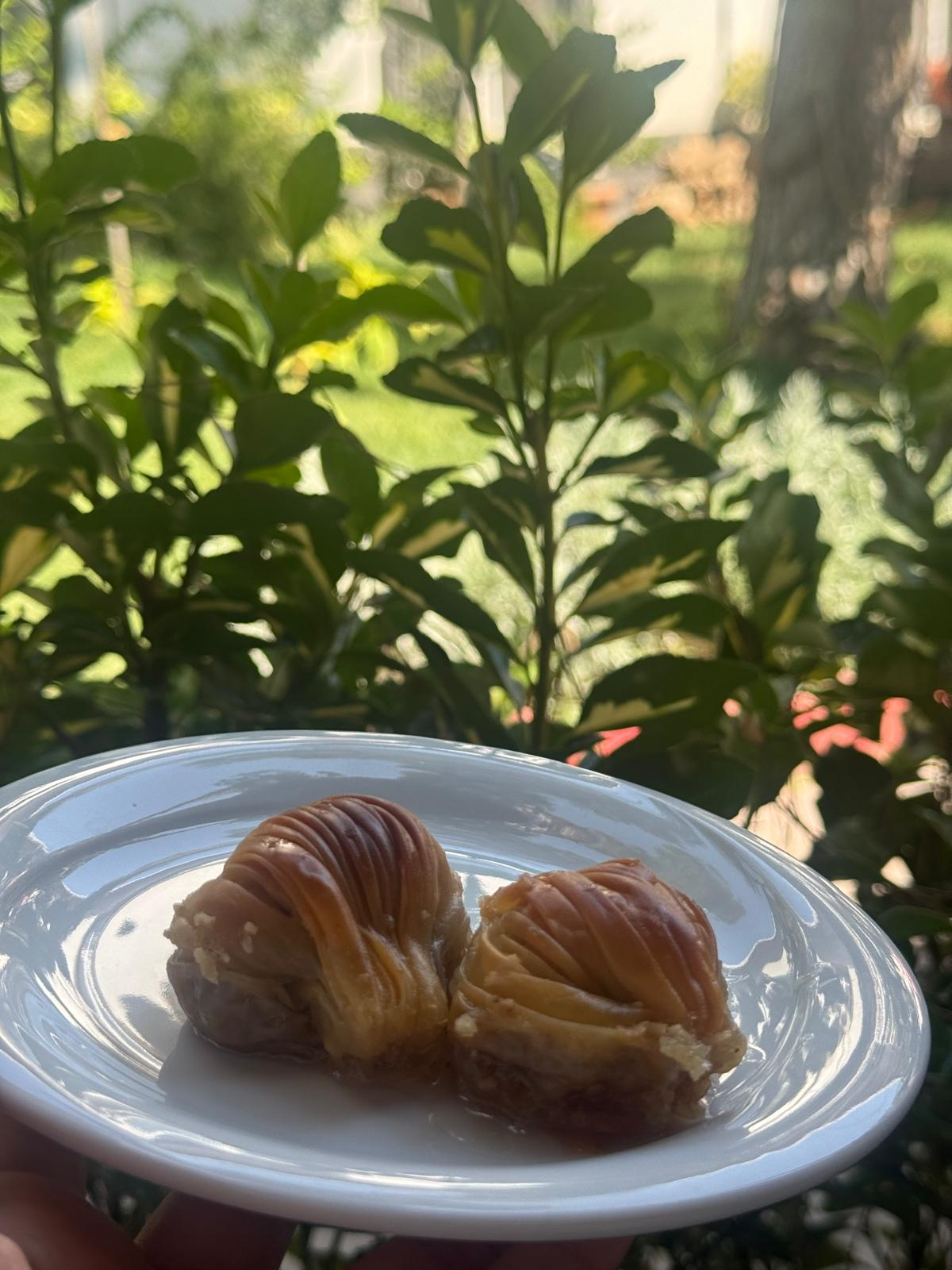
"Mussel"-shaped Midye-baklava, stuffed with walnuts

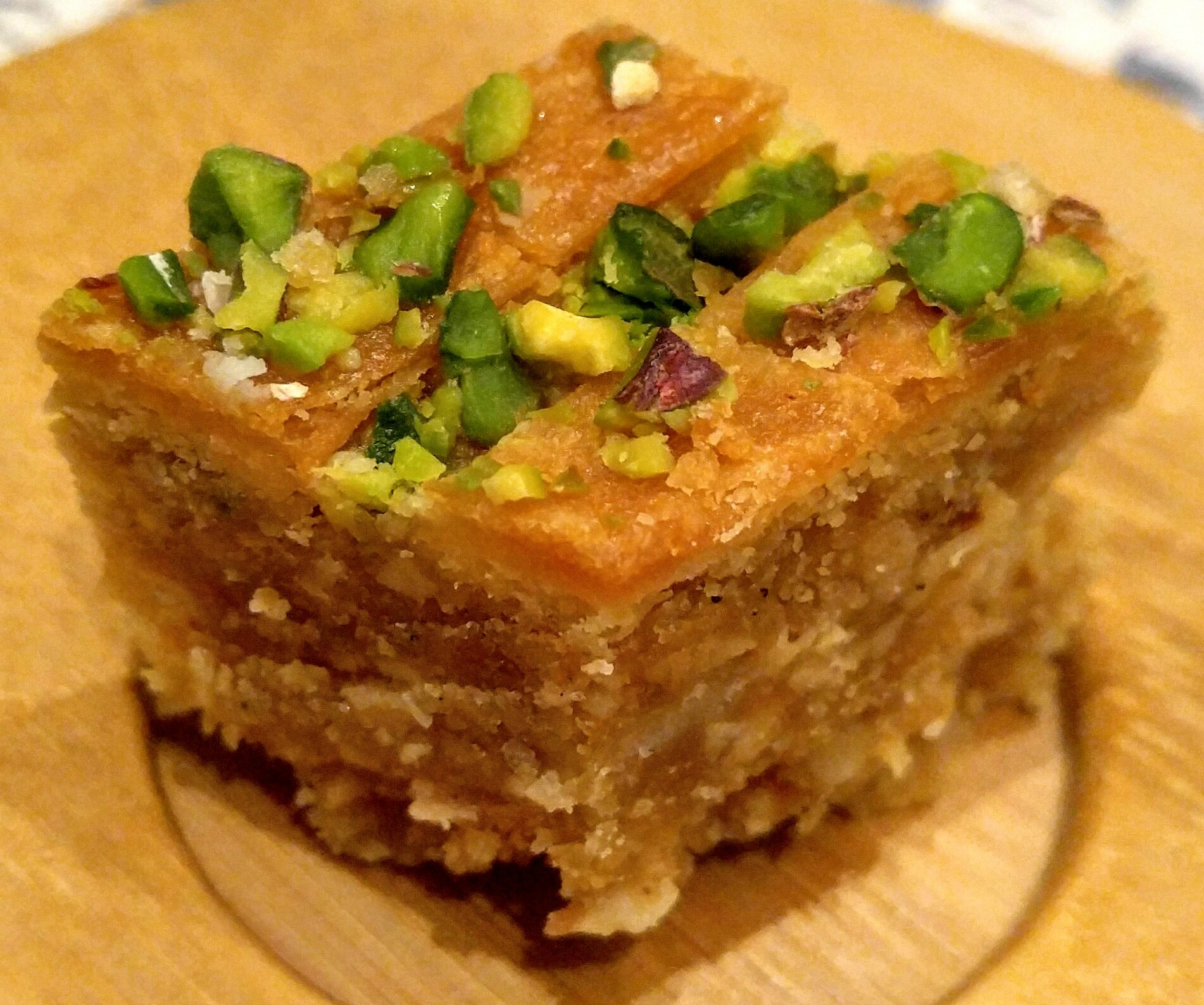
Yazdi baklava

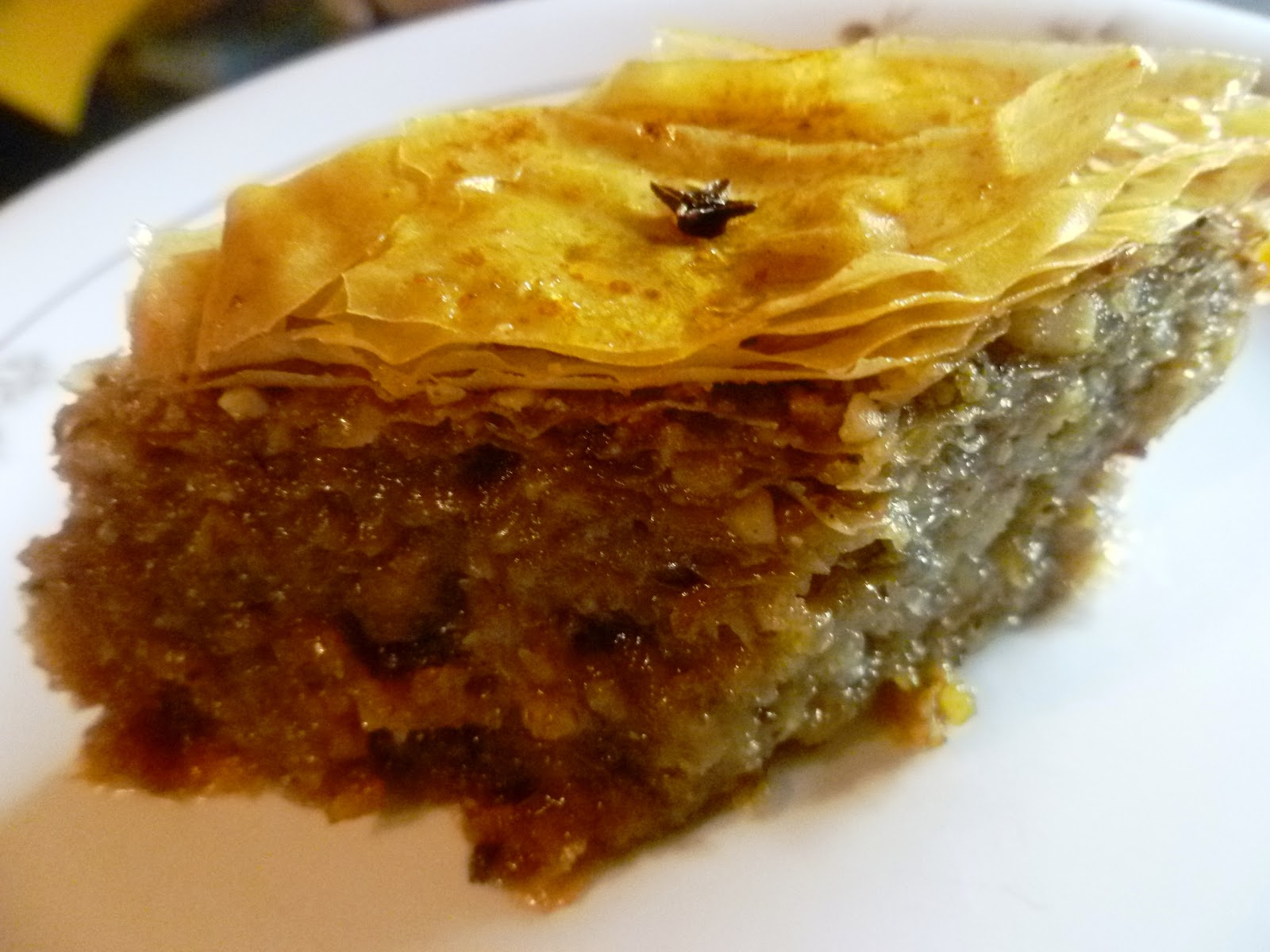
Greek baklava with walnuts

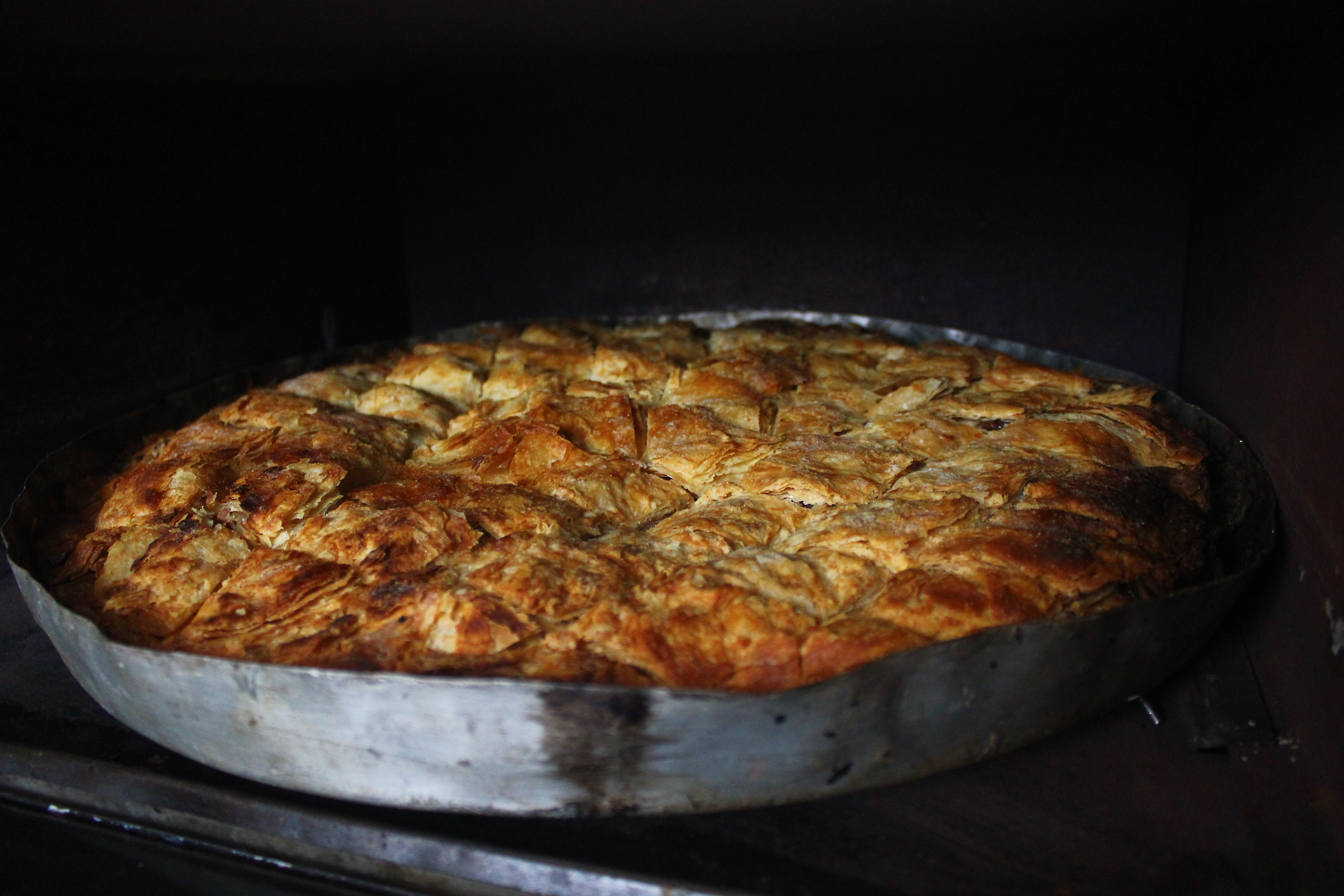
A tray of Albanian bakllava in Kosovo

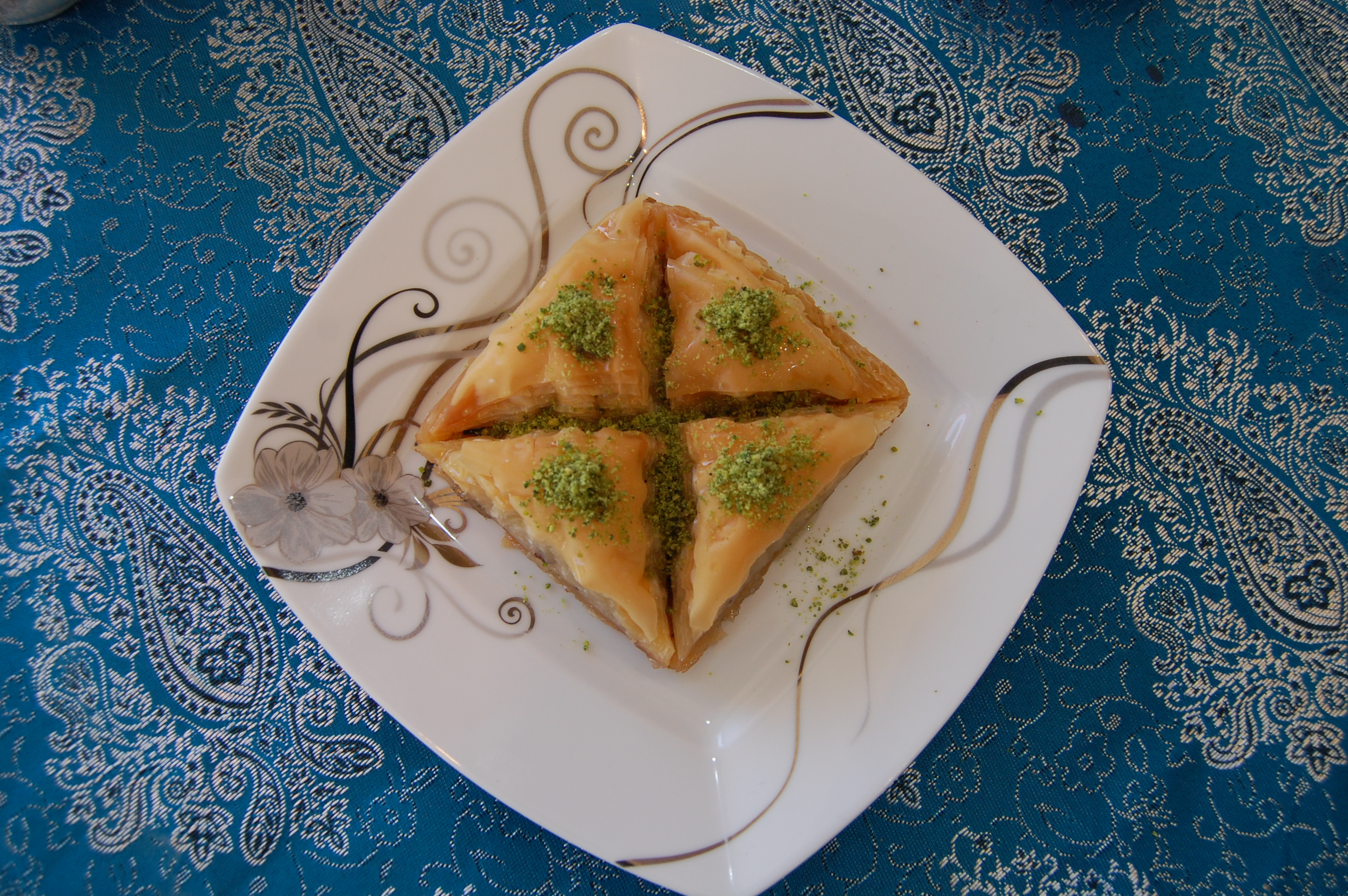
Syrian baklawa

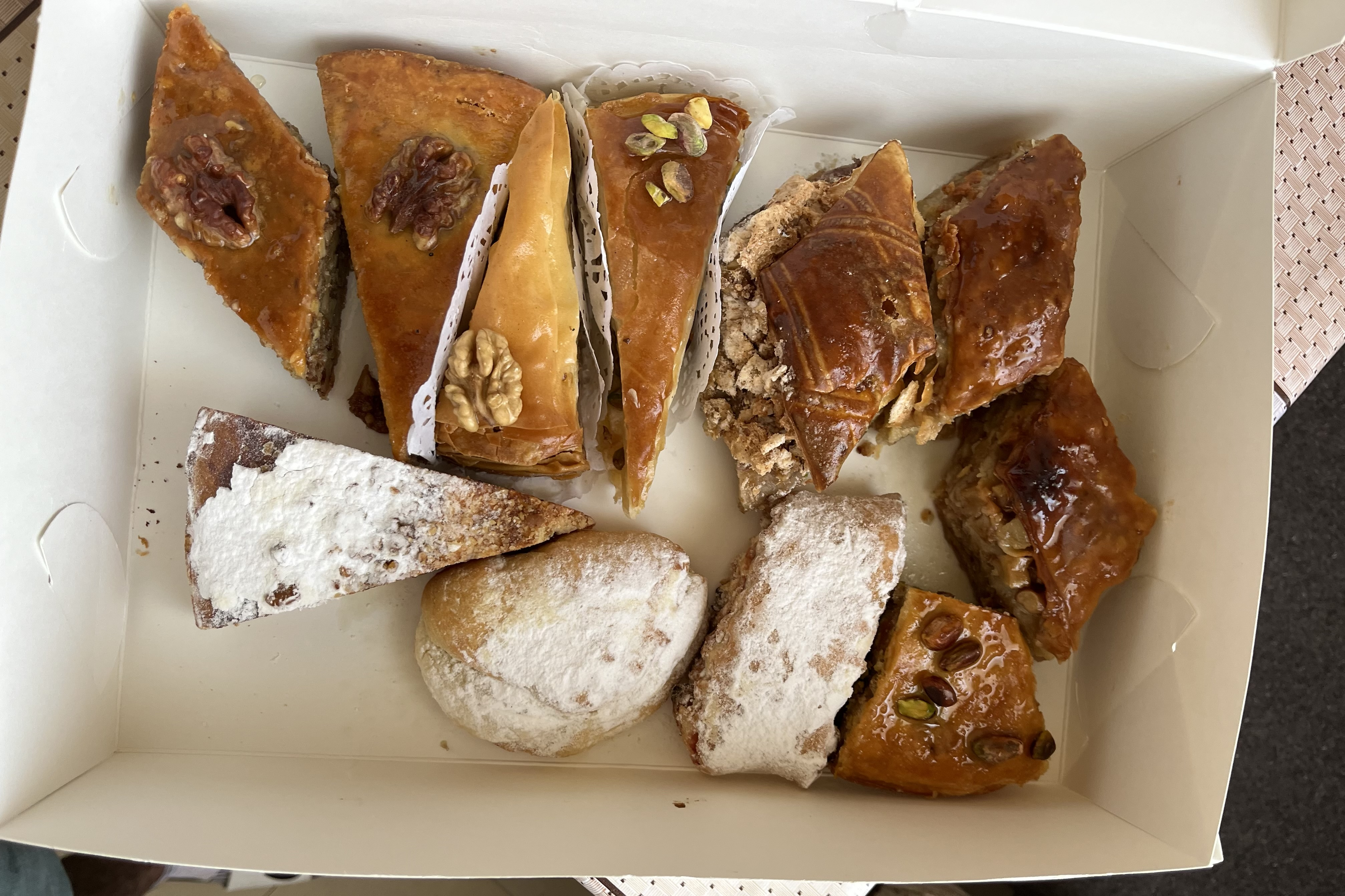
Armenian baklava alongside other Armenian pastries

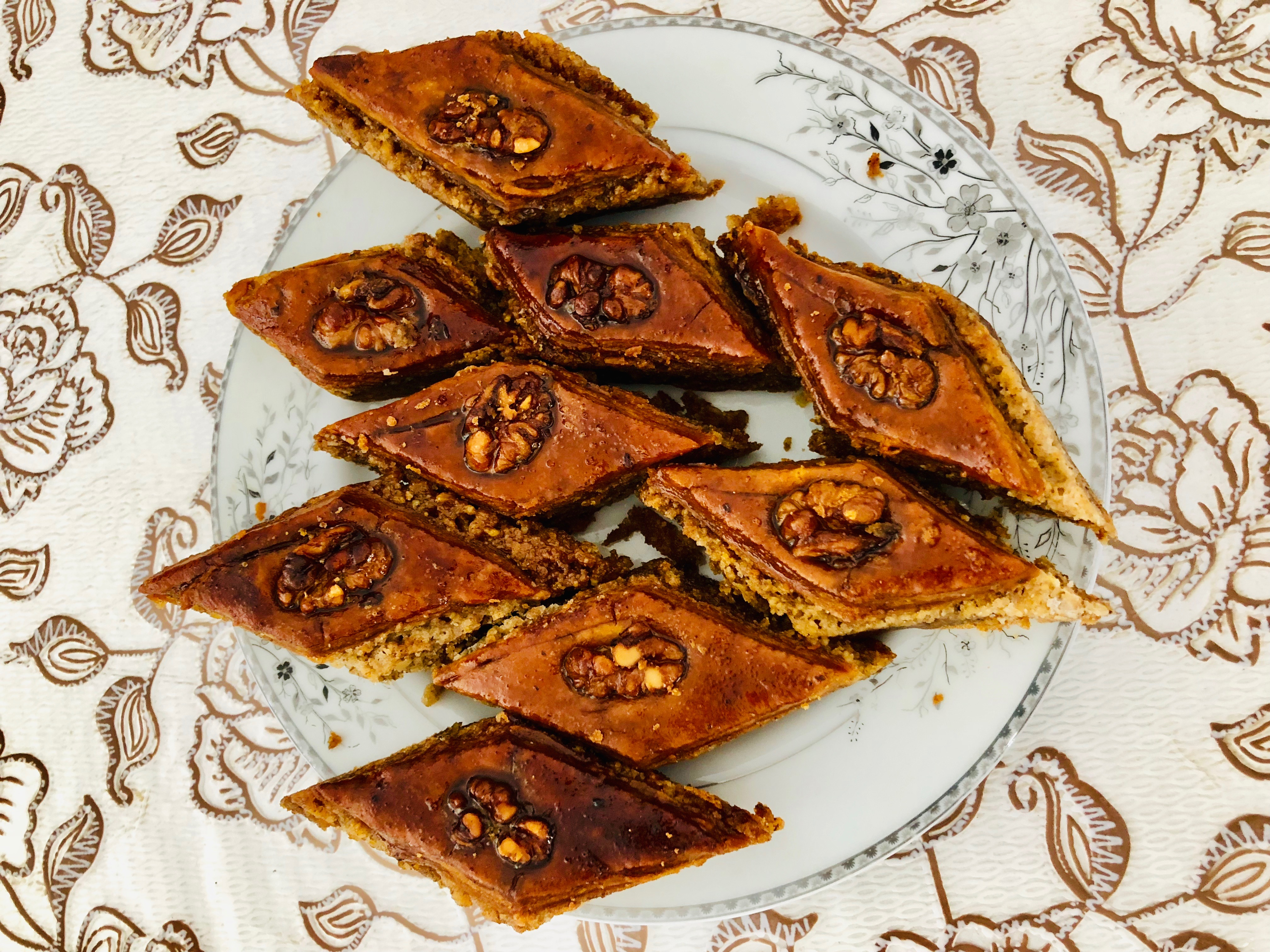
Armenian baklava from Artsakh

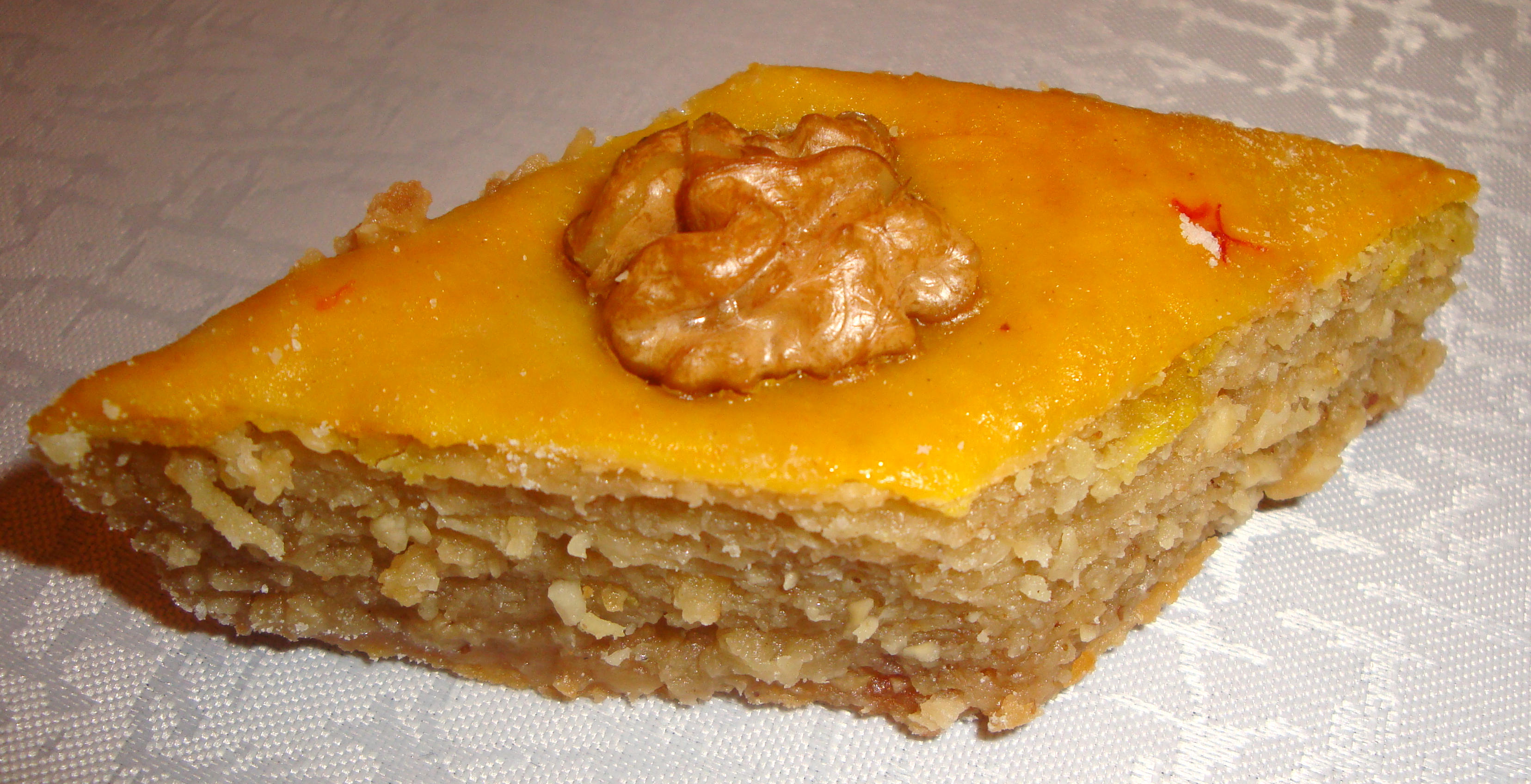
Azerbaijani baklava

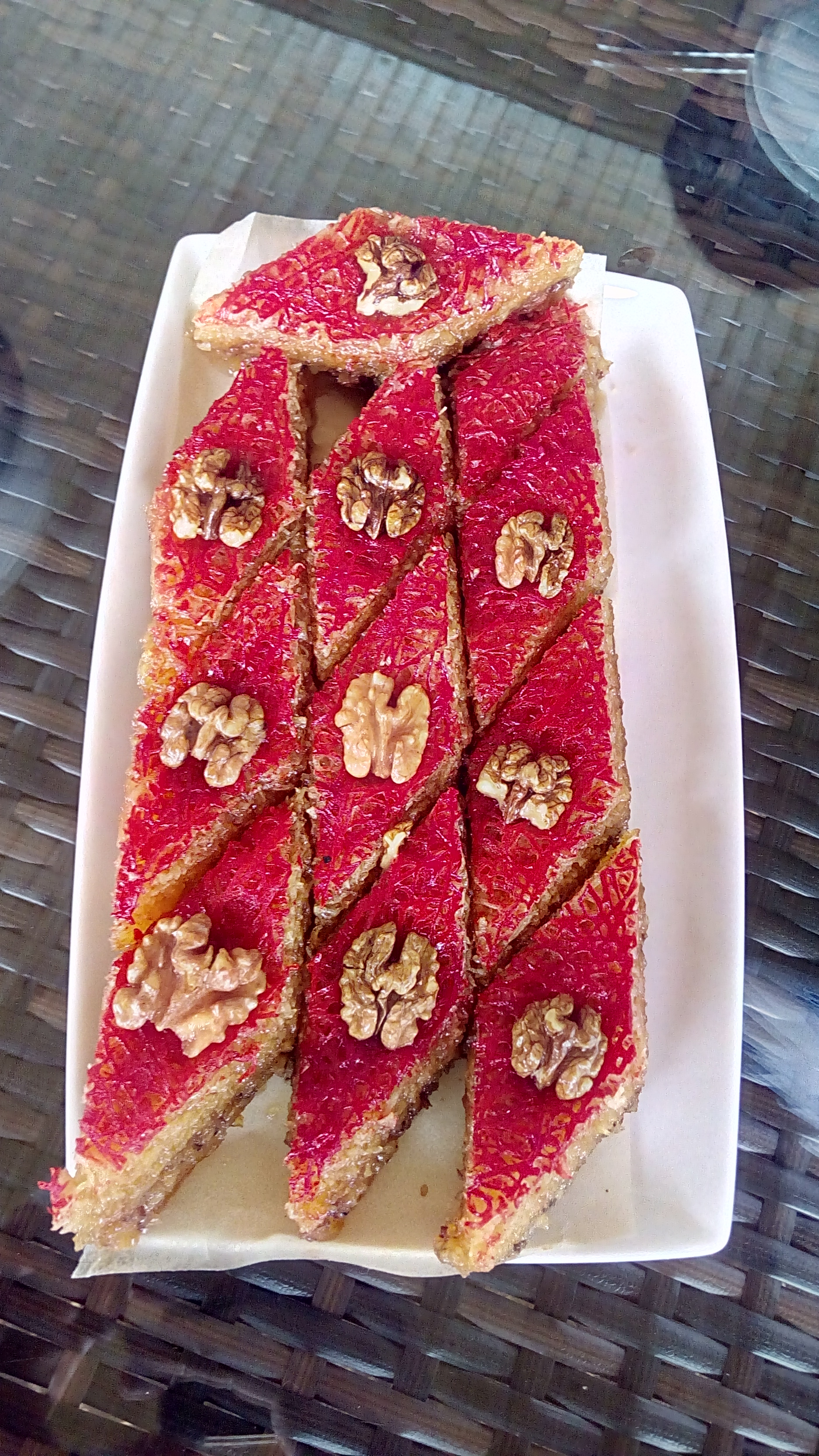
Quba baklava

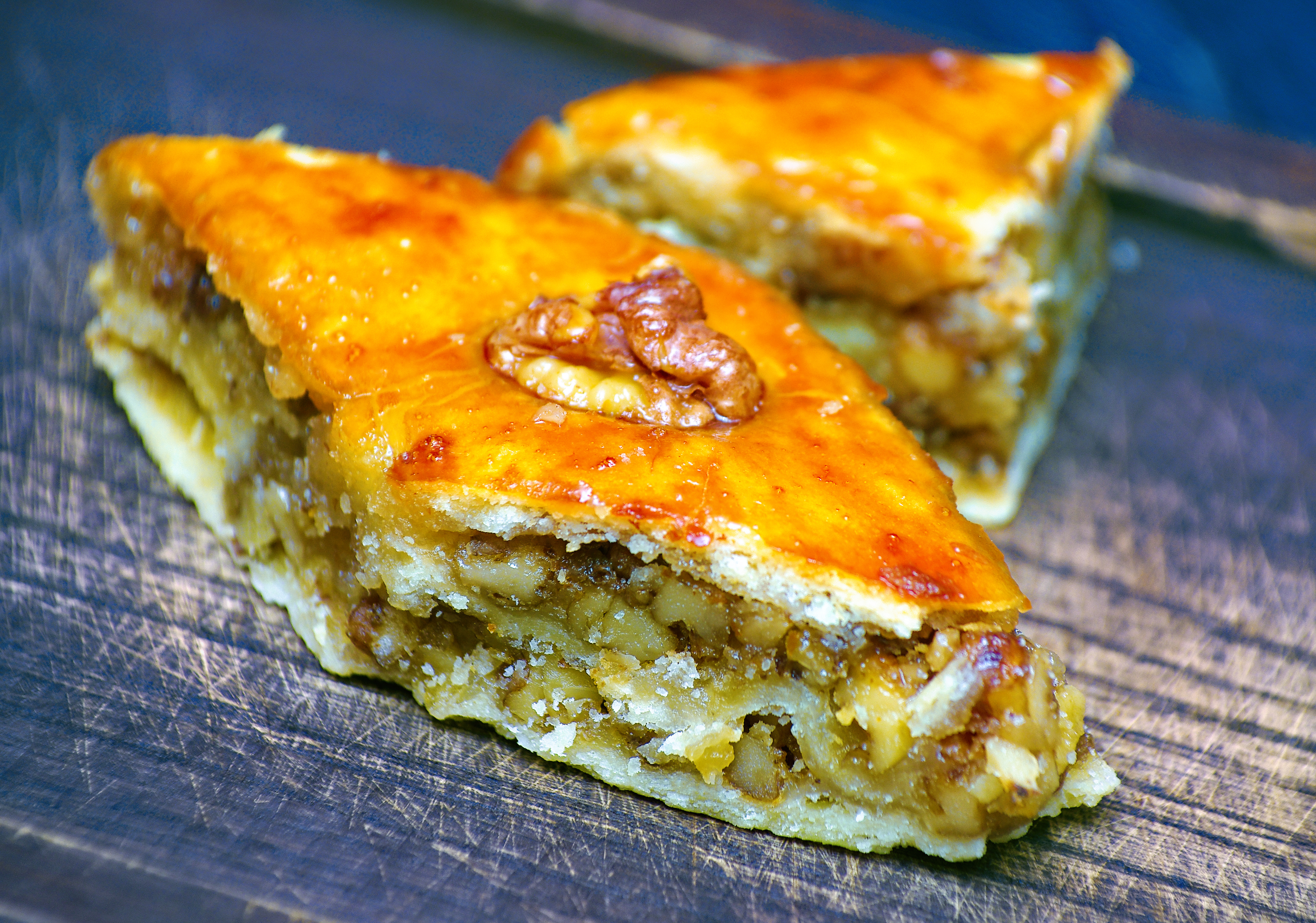
Armenian baklava

== See also ==
- Mille-feuille
- Strudel
- Sfogliatelle
- List of desserts
- List of foods with religious symbolism
- List of pastries
