= List of Intangible Cultural Heritage of Armenia =

This list is of the intangible cultural heritage of Armenia (Armenian: Հայաստանի Հանրապետության ոչ նյութական մշակութային ժառանգություն) as drawn up and published by The Ministry of Education, Science, Culture and Sport of the Republic of Armenia.

== Background ==
The Republic of Armenia ratified the UNESCO Convention for the Safeguarding of the Intangible Cultural Heritage on 18 May 2006. On 7 October 2009, Armenia adopted its domestic Law on Intangible Cultural Heritage. Defining the nation's intangible cultural heritage [hy] as "the customs, traditions, rites, representations and expressions, knowledge and skills, as well as the instruments, objects, artefacts and cultural spaces associated therewith", the Law applies to fourteen "domains":

1. Folklore (including (1) language and dialects (2) oral traditions)
2. Folk music
3. Folk dance
4. Folk theatre
5. Folk holidays
6. Folk life cycle customs
7. Relationship customs
8. Popular beliefs and customs
9. Folk practices
10. Economic life skills
11. Representations and knowledge of Nature
12. National cuisine
13. National games
14. Traditional cratsmanship

== List of Intangible Cultural Heritage ==
As of 2025, and after the 2021, 2022, and 2023 additions to the 2010 list, there were sixty-eight entries on the List of Intangible Cultural Heritage of Armenia (Armenian: ՀՀ ոչ նյութական մշակութային ժառանգության արժեքների ցանկն).

Value	Domain	Comments	Image	UNESCO
"Daredevils of Sassoun" epic «Սասնա ծռեր» էպոս	Folklore			
Echoes of "One Thousand and One Nights" in Armenian folk tales «Հազար ու մի գիշեր» հեքիաթի սյուժետային դրսևորումները հայ ժողովրդական հեքիաթներում	Folklore			
Satirical folklore of Shirak; Շիրակի երգիծական բանահյուսությունը	Folklore			
Kochari; Քոչարի; K'očari	Folk dance			
Yarkhushta; Յարխուշտա	Folk dance			
Batola; Բատոլա	Folk dance			
Tamzara; Թամզարա	Folk dance			
Song "Krunk" «Կռունկ» երգ	Folk music			
Song "Gatseq Teseq" «Գացեք, տեսեք» երգ	Folk music	("Go and see")		
Romance of the troubadours Աշուղական սիրավեպ	Folk music			
Musical Instrument Tar and Tar making Թառը եւ թառագործությունը	Folk music			
Sahari; Սահարի	Folk music			
Duduk and its music Դուդուկը եւ դրա երաժշտությունը	Folk music			
Instrument "Kanon" «Քանոն» երաժշտական նվագարանը	Folk music			
Song "[???]" «Անա նանան քե ղուրբան» երգ	Folk music			
Lavash, the preparation, meaning and appearance of traditional bread as an expression of culture in Armenia; Լավաշ. ավանդական հացի պատրաստումը, նշանակությունը եւ մշակութային դրսեւորումները	National cuisine			
Preparation of Gata and its cultural expressions Գաթայի պատրաստումը եւ մշակութային դրսեւորումները	National cuisine			
Making of vodka from fruits Մրգից օղիների պատրաստում	National cuisine			
The tradition of the preparation and use of matsun (yogurt); Մածունի պատրաստման ու կիրառման ավանդույթը	National cuisine			
Winemaking; Գինեգործություն	National cuisine			
The tradition of the ritual dish Kurkut in Kapan; Կուրկուտ ծիսական ուտեստի ավանդույթը Կապանում	National cuisine			
The tradition of making dried fruits from persimmons and figs in Meghri; Արքայանարնջի եւ թզի չրերի պատրաստման ավանդույթը Մեղրիում	National cuisine			
The tradition of making Chechil (string cheese) and braided cheese of the Shirak province Շիրակի մարզի չեչիլ եւ հյուսած պանիրների պատրաստման ավանդույթը	National cuisine			
The tradition of Kyavar pakhlava making and its use Քյավառի փախլավայի պատրաստման եւ կիրառման ավանդույթը	National cuisine			
Making of beetroot stem pickle Ճախաթթվի (ճըխըթթո) պատրաստում	National cuisine			
The tradition of sweet sharots making in Ashtarak; Քաղցր շարոցի պատրաստման ավանդույթը Աշտարակում	National cuisine			
The culture of making and using tolma Տոլմայի պատրաստման և կիրառման մշակույթը	National cuisine	cf. Dolma Festival in Armenia		
The tradition of making and using [???] in the Community of Vardenis; Տոմաստի պատրաստման և կիրառման ավանդույթը Վարդենիս համայնքում	National cuisine			
Traditional wedding ritual Ավանդական հարսանեկան ծիսակատարություն	Life cycle			
Khavits; Խավիծ	Life cycle			
Uvula raising Կատիկի բարձրացում	Life cycle			
Funeral rite Թաղման ծես	Life cycle			
Yezidi Wedding ritual Եզդիների հարսանեկան ծեսը	Life cycle			
First tooth selection ritual Ատամհատիկի ծիսական արարողությունը	Life cycle			
Symbolic use and ornamentation of tarehats (Year bread, Armenian national bread); Տարի հացի խորհրդանշանային կիրառում եւ նախշազարդում	Nature			
The folk tradition of breeding and training the "Yerevan Tumbler" Armenian racing pigeon Հայկական խաղացող աղավնու` «երևանյան կուդուլի» բուծման և վարժեցման ժողովրդական ավանդույթը	Nature	cf. Armenian Tumbler		
The tradition of collecting wild plants and fruits in the communities of the Tavush province of the Republic of Armenia; Վայրի բույսերի եւ պտուղների հավաքչության ավանդույթը ՀՀ Տավուշի մարզի համայնքներում	Economic life			
Going to the mountains: tradition of the culture of distant cattle-breeding in the Tavush province of the Republic of Armenia; Սար գնալ. հեռագնա անասնապահության մշակույթի ավանդույթը ՀՀ Տավուշի մարզում	Economic life			
The tradition of apiculture in the Community of Chambarak; Մեղվապահության ավանդույթը Ճամբարակ համայնքում	Economic life			
Traditional Forging; Ավանդական դարբնություն	Traditional crafts			
Craftsmanship of Khachkars (cross-stones); Խաչքարագործության վարպետություն	Traditional crafts			
Lace making Ժանեկագործություն	Traditional crafts			
Tradition of making and using tonir Թոնրի պատրաստման եւ կիրառման ավանդույթ	Traditional crafts			
Traditional rug weaving Ավանդական գորգագործություն	Traditional crafts			
Embroidery; Ասեղնագործություն	Traditional crafts			
Embroidery culture of the Syrian-Armenian community of Armenia; Հայաստանի սիրիահայ համայնքի ասեղնագործական մշակույթը	Traditional crafts			
Armenian manuscript illumination and its cultural expressions Հայկական մանրանկարչությունը և դրա մշակութային դրսևորումները	Traditional crafts			
The Gyumri goldsmithing and silversmithing tradition Գյումրիի ոսկերչության և արծաթագործության ավանդույթը	Traditional crafts			
The tradition and use of Dilijan wood carving Դիլիջանի փայտի փորագրության ավանդույթը և կիրառումը	Traditional crafts			
The tradition and practice of pottery in Sisian and Goris; Սիսիանի և Գորիսի խեցեգործության ավանդույթը և կիրառությունը	Traditional crafts			
The tradition of making and using a wooden amulet Փայտե հմայիլի պատրաստման եւ կիրառման ավանդույթ	Traditional crafts			
St. Sargis day Սուրբ Սարգսի տոն	Folk holidays			
Tiarn'ndaraj (Trndez); Տերընդեզ	Folk holidays			
Vardavar; Վարդավառ	Folk holidays			
Ascension day Համբարձման տոն («Վիճակ»)	Folk holidays			
Resurrection day ("Easter"); Սուրբ Հարության տոն («Զատիկ», «Սուրբ Զատիկ»)	Folk holidays			
New Year «Նոր տարի» տոն	Folk holidays			
Celebration of Musa Ler (mountain); Մուսա լեռան տոնակատարությունը	Folk holidays			
Celebration of the New Year of the Assyrians; Ասորիների Նոր տարվա տոնակատարությունը	Folk holidays			
Worship of Saint Tevatorus of Nigavan village of Aragatsotn province of RA; ՀՀ Արագածոտնի մարզի Նիգավան գյուղի Սուրբ Թեւաթորոսի պաշտամունք	Folk beliefs			
Worship of Tukh Manouk of Kasakh village of Aragatsotn province of RA; ՀՀ Արագածոտնի մարզի Քասախ գյուղի Թուխ Մանուկի պաշտամունք	Folk beliefs			
Pilgrimage to the monastery of St. Thaddeus the Apostle; Սուրբ Թադեոս առաքյալի վանքի ուխտագնացությունը	Folk beliefs			
Ster: sanctification of the bedding in Armenian Yezidi culture Ստեռ. անկողնու ծալքի սրբազնացումը Հայաստանի եզդիների մշակույթում	Folk beliefs			
Family tree Տոհմածառ	Relationship customs			
Armenian letter art and its cultural expressions Հայկական տառարվեստը եւ դրա մշակութային դրսեւորումները	Folklore (language)			
Ararat dialect Արարատյան բարբառ	Folklore (dialects)			
Karin dialect Կարնո բարբառ	Folklore (dialects)			
Backgammon; Կարնո բարբառ	National games			

== List of Intangible Cultural Heritage in need of Urgent Safeguarding ==
As of 2025, and after the 2019, 2021, and 2023 additions to the 2011 list, there were thirty-three entries on the List of Urgent Safeguarding Intangible Cultural Heritage of Armenia (Armenian: ՀՀ անհապաղ պաշտպանության կարիք ունեցող ոչ նյութական մշակութային ժառանգության արժեքների ցանկն).

ICH	Domain	Comments	Image	UNESCO
Epic "Karos Khach" «Կարոս խաչ» վիպասք	Folklore			
Karchevan dialect Կարճևանի բարբառ	Folklore (dialects)			
The Pontic dialect of the Greek population of Armenia; Հայաստանի հույն ազգաբնակչության պոնտիերեն բարբառ	Folklore (dialects)			
"Vichak" (ritual) Songs; Վիճակի երգեր	Folk music			
Song "Avetis" (good tidings); Ժողովրդական ավետիսներ	Folk music			
Bagpipes (tik); Պարկապզուկ (տիկ)	Folk music			
Ud; Ուդ	Folk music			
Kamani and kemano Քամանի և քեմանո	Folk music			
The tradition of tambourine performance and making Դափի կատարողական և նվագարանագործական ավանդույթ	Folk music			
The tradition of sant'ur performance and making Սանթուրի կատարողական և նվագարանագործական ավանդույթ	Folk music			
The tradition of saz performance and making Սազի կատարողական և նվագարանագործական ավանդույթ	Folk music			
Candle dance Մոմերով պար	Folk dance			
Tightrope walking Լարախաղացություն	Folk theatre			
Shadow puppet theatre Ստվերների տիկնիկային թատրոն	Folk theatre			
Barekendan (eve of Great Lent or Great barekendan); Բարեկենդան	Folk holidays			
"Khachbur"; Խաչբուռ	Nature			
"Kathnavov matagh" ritual «Կաթնավով մատաղ» ծես	Nature			
"Buka barane"" rain-making ritual «Բուկա բարանե» անձրևաբեր ծես	Nature			
The tradition of malt making Ածիկի պատրաստման ավանդույթ	National cuisine			
The tradition of whole grain and sourdough bread making and using Ամբողջահատիկ ալյուրից և թթխմորից հացի պատրաստման և կիրառման ավանդույթ	National cuisine			
Tradition of using wine jars Գինու կարասի կիրառման ավանդույթ	National cuisine			
Koch Wrestling; Կոխ ըմբշամարտ	National games			
Traditional equestrian vaulting Ավանդական ձիախաղեր	National games			
Seven stones Յոթը քար	National games			
Qarktik; Քարկտիկ	National games			
Vordan karmir (Armenian cochineal): traditional knowledge, skills and experience related to Armenian cochineal Որդան կարմիր. հայկական որդանին առնչվող ավանդական գիտելիքներ, հմտություններ և փորձառություն	Traditional crafts			
Shulal carpet Շուլալ կարպետ	Traditional crafts			
Felting; Թաղիքագործություն	Traditional crafts			
Klklan (cup) of Gyumri, Mushurba; Գյումրվա կլկլան (մուշուրբա)	Traditional crafts			
Gyumri carpentry Գյումրիի ատաղձագործություն	Traditional crafts			
Tradition of [???] in the Community of Meghri; Մեղրի համայնքի չաթանագործության ավանդույթ	Traditional crafts			
The tradition of pottery in Goris and Sisian; Գորիս և Սիսիան համայնքների բրուտության ավանդույթ	Traditional crafts			
Hazarashen (opening in the roof); Հազարաշեն	Traditional crafts			

== See also ==
- List of Intangible Cultural Heritage elements in Armenia
- Culture of Armenia
