= Sini Häkkinen =

Finnish volleyball player (born 1990)

Personal information
- Full name: Sini Häkkinen
- Nationality: Finnish
- Born: 19 March 1990 (age 36); Helsinki, Finland

Sini Häkkinen (born 1990) is a Finnish volleyball player. Her playing position is wing spiker. She has played 11 times with the Finnish national women's volleyball team. The clubs she has played for include Pihtiputaan Ploki, Pislaploki and LP Viesti Salo. She is right-handed and 1.83 m tall.
