= Lauzinaj =

Medieval Arabic and Persian almond confection

Lauzinaj (Arabic: لوزينج), also spelled lawzinaj, lawzinaq, luzina is an almond-based confection known from medieval Arab cuisine. Described as the "food of kings" and "supreme judge of all sweets", by the 13th-century lauzinaj had entered medieval European cuisine from the Andalusian influence, returning Crusaders and Latin translations of cookery books.

== History ==
References about the confection abound in Arabic literature. It is mentioned by the 10th-century poet Al-Ma'muni, and Sahnun, a qadi who advises one of his students that the reward for long hours of studying law is the prospect of earning enough wealth to eat pistachio filled lauzinaj.

Two versions of the dish are known from medieval texts:

1. Lauzinaj mugharraq or "drenched lauzinaj", some scholars believe this dish is an earlier version of baklava (though Charles Perry has written that "it was not much like baklava"). It was made by filling thin pastry dough with a mixture of ground almond (and sometimes other nuts like pistachio or walnut), rosewater, and sometimes luxury flavorings like mastic, ambergris, or musk. Perry notes that egg whites were sometimes used to stiffen the mixture.
2. Lauzinaj yabis was made with ground almonds cooked in boiling honey or sugar until reaching a taffy like consistency. The raw version, closer to marzipan in consistency, was made by blending the almonds with sugar and flavoring with camphor, musk and rosewater. The finished confection was molded into animal or other shapes, or cut into squares and triangles. A Middle-Persian predecessor, lawzenag, is mentioned in Khosrow and Ridag (#40).

One historic recipe is given in the 10th-century that describes how to make lauzinaj by blending crushed sugar and almonds with rosewater, and rolling it in thin dough, similar to sanbusaj (samosa) dough, but ideally even thinner. The poet Ibn al-Rumi compared the dough to grasshopper wings. The finished pastry would be drenched in rosewater-flavored simple syrup and garnished with crushed pistachio.
