= Gulkand =

Indian rose petal preserve

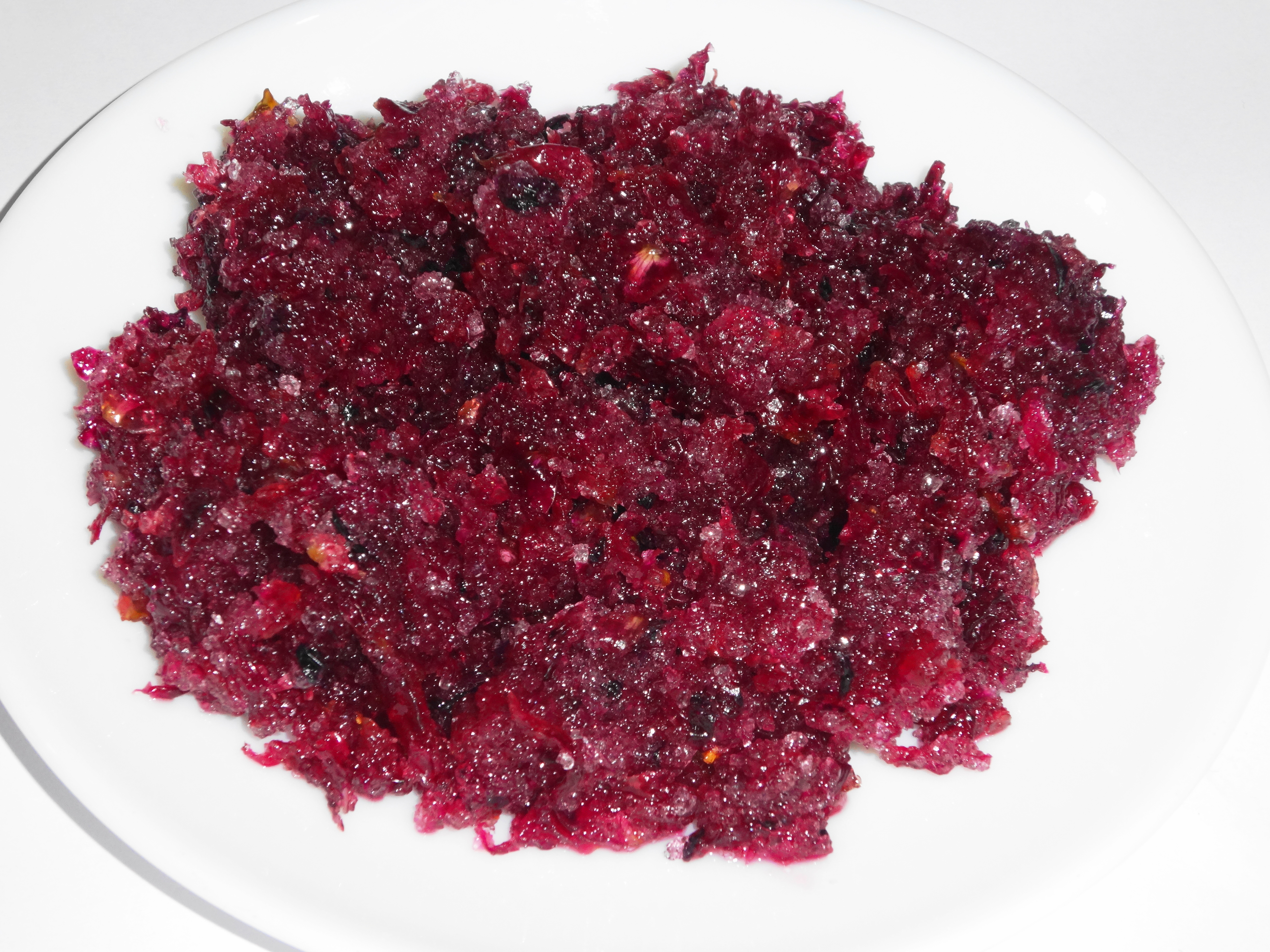
- A plate of gulkand
- Alternative names: Rose petal jam
- Region or state: Indian subcontinent
- Serving temperature: Room temperature
- Main ingredients: Rose petals, sugar

Gulkand (also written gulqand or gulkhand) is a sweet preserve of rose petals originating in the Indian subcontinent. The term is derived from Persian; gul (rose) and qand (sugar/sweet).

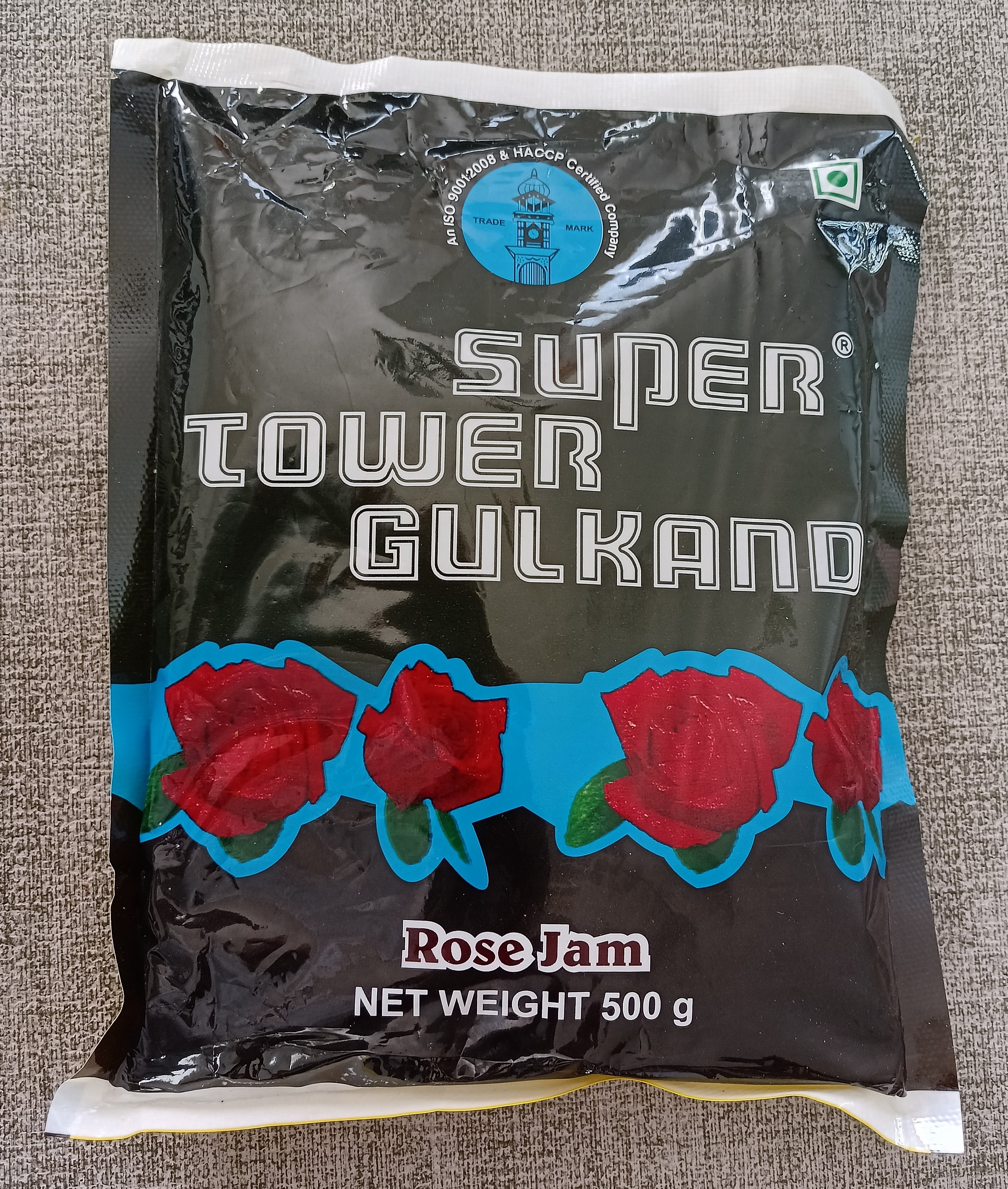
A package of gulkand

== Preparation ==
Traditionally, gulkand is prepared with Damask roses. Other common types of roses used include China rose, French rose, and Cabbage rose. Rose petals are slow-cooked with sugar, which reduces the juices into a thick consistency.

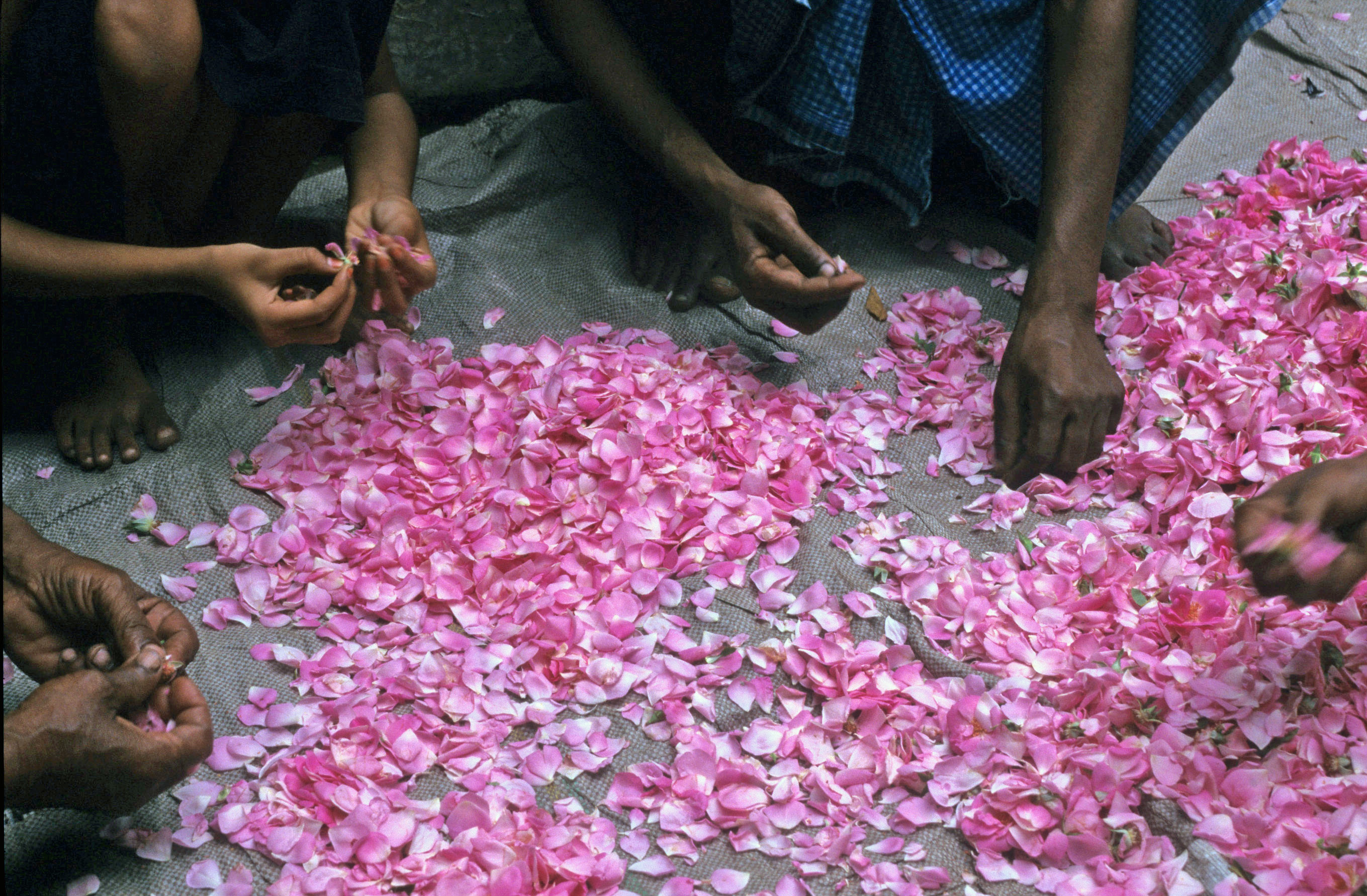
Rose petals being prepared for gulkand

== Uses in holistic medicine ==
Gulkand is used in the Unani system of medicine as a cooling tonic. It is also used in Ayurvedic and Persian medicine to help with bodily imbalances.
