= Sini, Chaharmahal and Bakhtiari =

Sini سيني
- Village
- Location within Iran
- Coordinates: 31°33′24″N 51°02′46″E
- Country: Iran
- Province: Chaharmahal and Bakhtiari
- County: Lordegan
- Bakhsh: Khanmirza
- Rural District: Khanmirza

Population (2006)
  - Total: 1,314
- Time zone: UTC+3:30 (IRST)

Sini (Persian: سيني, also Romanized as Sīnī) is a village in Khanmirza Rural District, Khanmirza District, Lordegan County, Chaharmahal and Bakhtiari Province, Iran. At the 2006 census, its population was 1,314, in 276 families.
