= List of goat cheeses =

Cultured products of milk of domestic goats

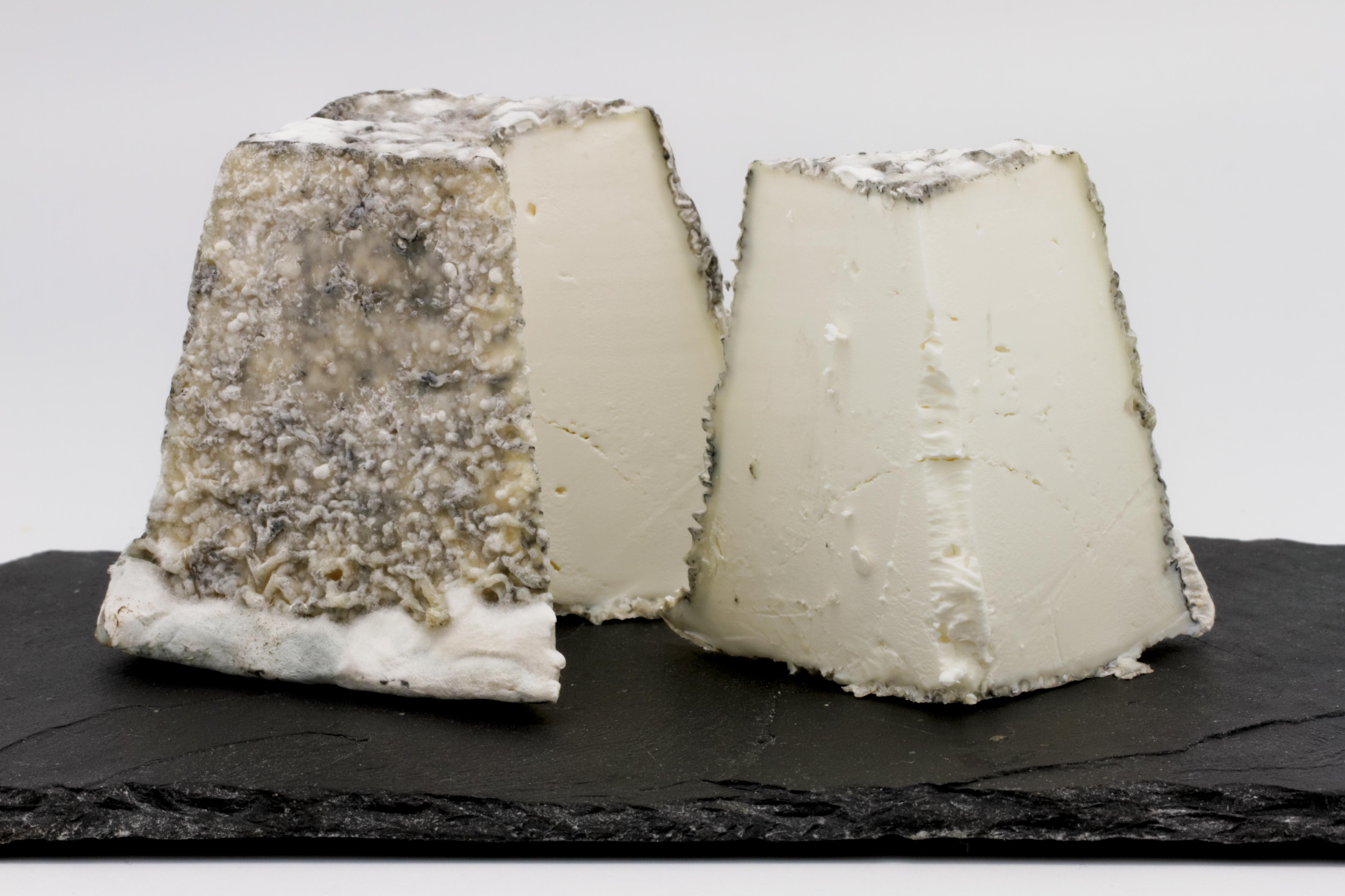
Valençay cheese

Goat cheese is produced using goat milk, the milk of domestic goats. Goat milk is commonly used to make cultured dairy products, including cheese. Myriad goat milk cheeses are produced around the world.

== Traditional varieties ==
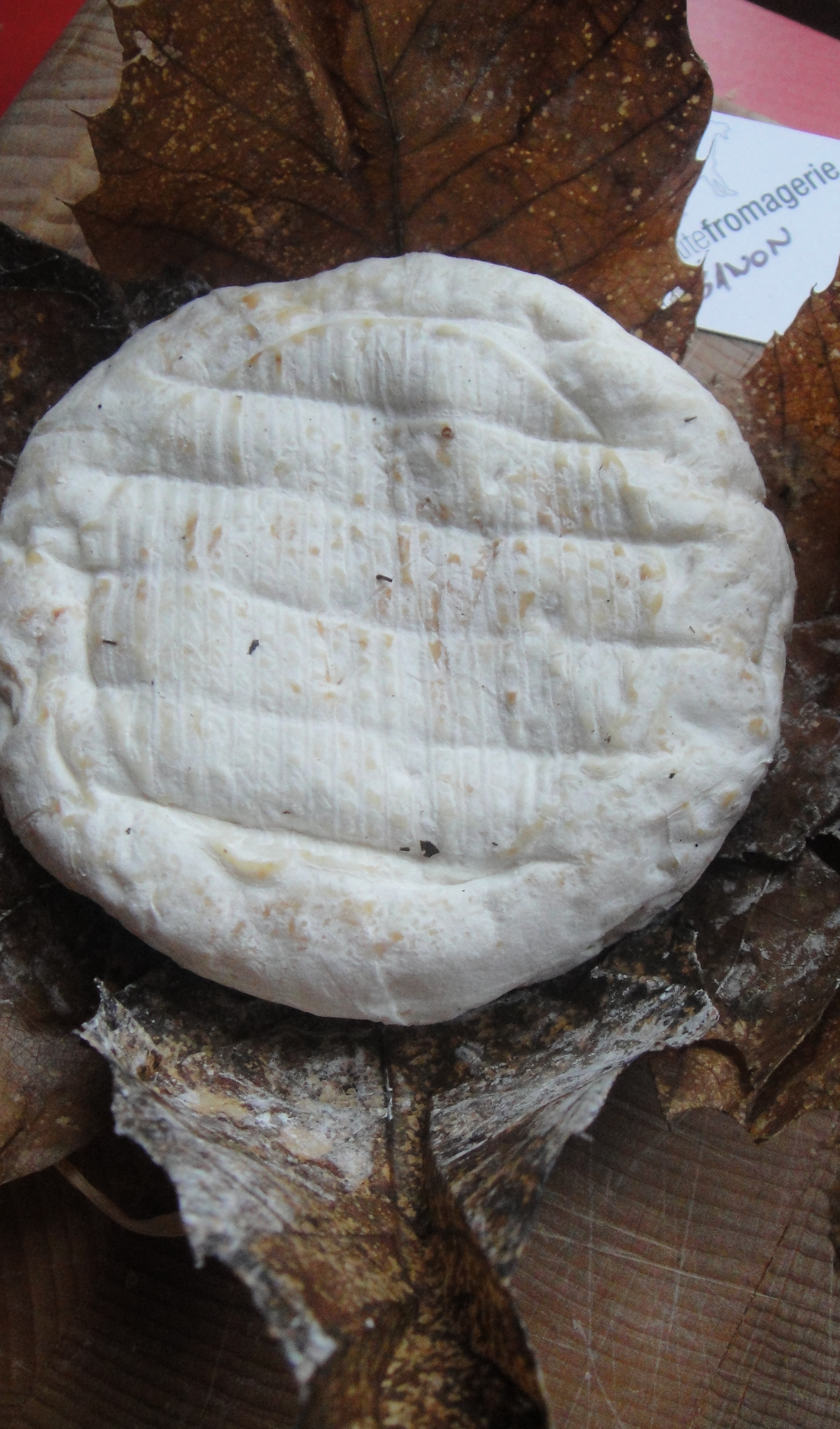
Banon wrapped in chestnut leaves

- Anari cheese – Type of goat cheese
- Añejo cheese – a firm, aged Mexican cheese traditionally made from skimmed goat's milk, but most often available made from skimmed cow's milk.
- Anthotyros – Traditional Greek whey cheese
- Banon cheese – French goat cheese
- Bastardo del Grappa – Italian cheese
- Brunost (known as Geitost when made with goat milk) – a Norwegian brown goat cheese with a sweet flavor profile

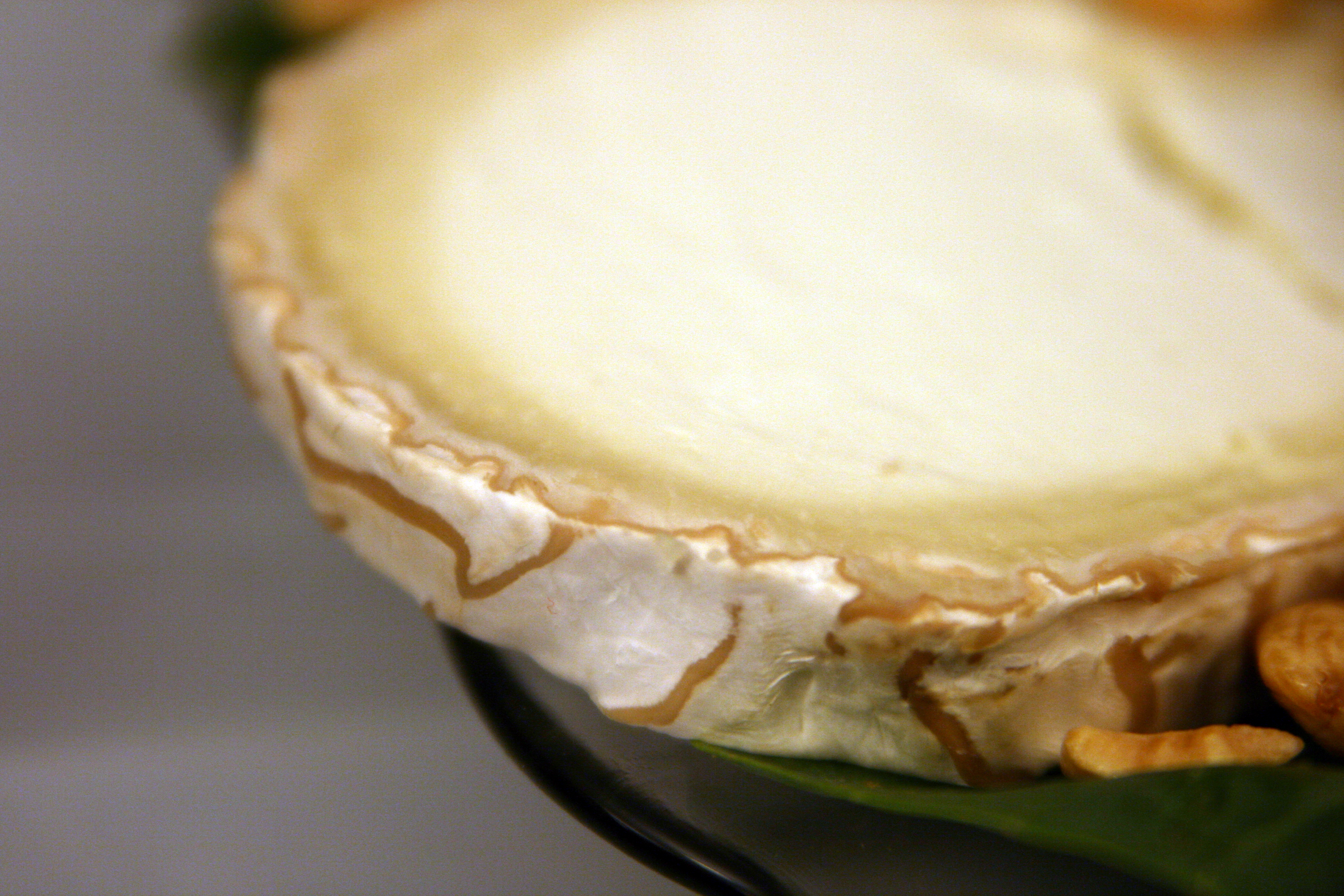
Bucheron

- Bucheron – native to the Loire Valley in France
- Cabécou
- Cabrales cheese
- Caciotta
- Caprino cheese
- Castelo Branco cheese
- Cathare

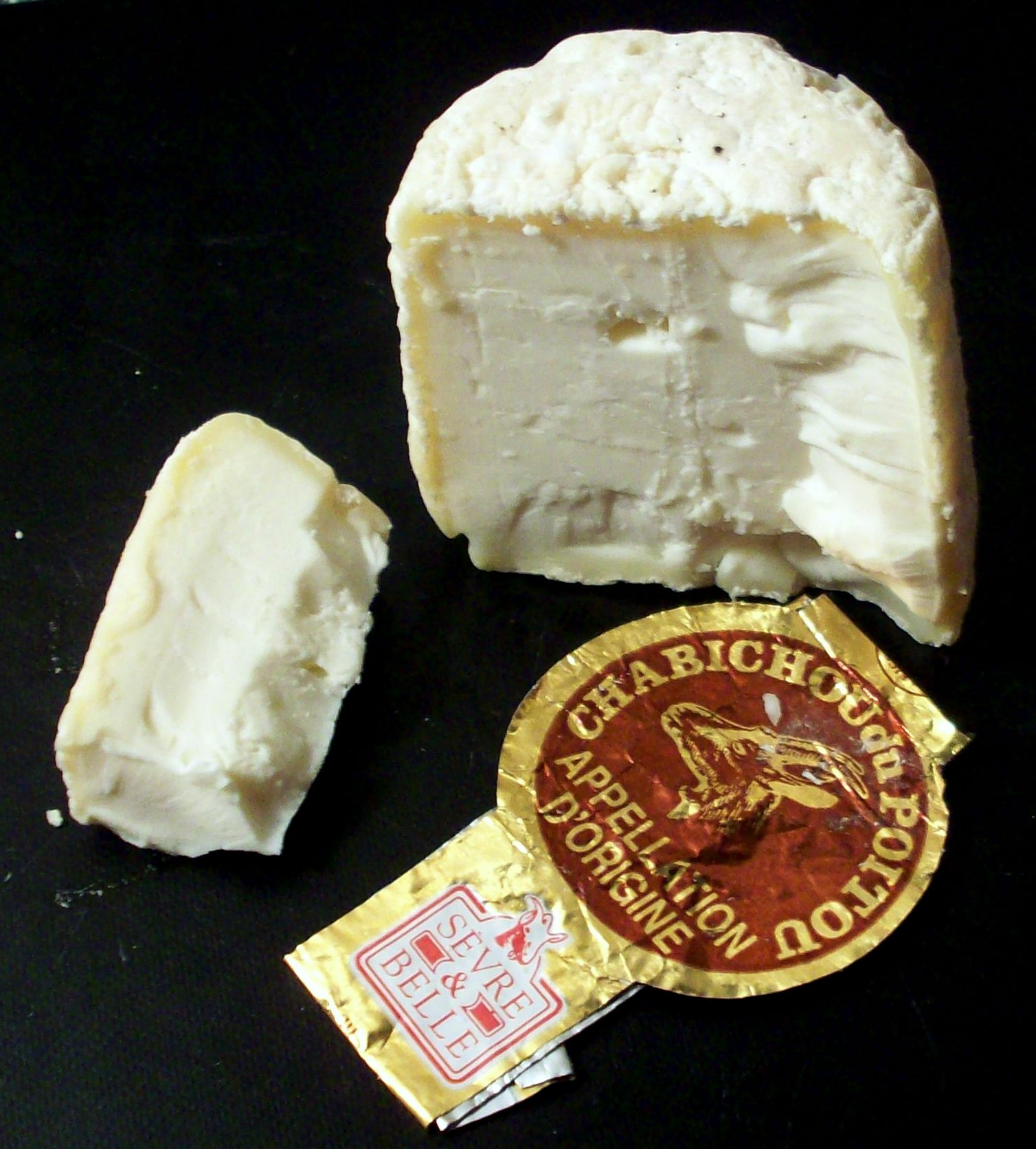
Chabichou

- Chabichou
- Chabis
- Chevrotin
- Circassian cheese
- Circassian smoked cheese
- Couronne lochoise

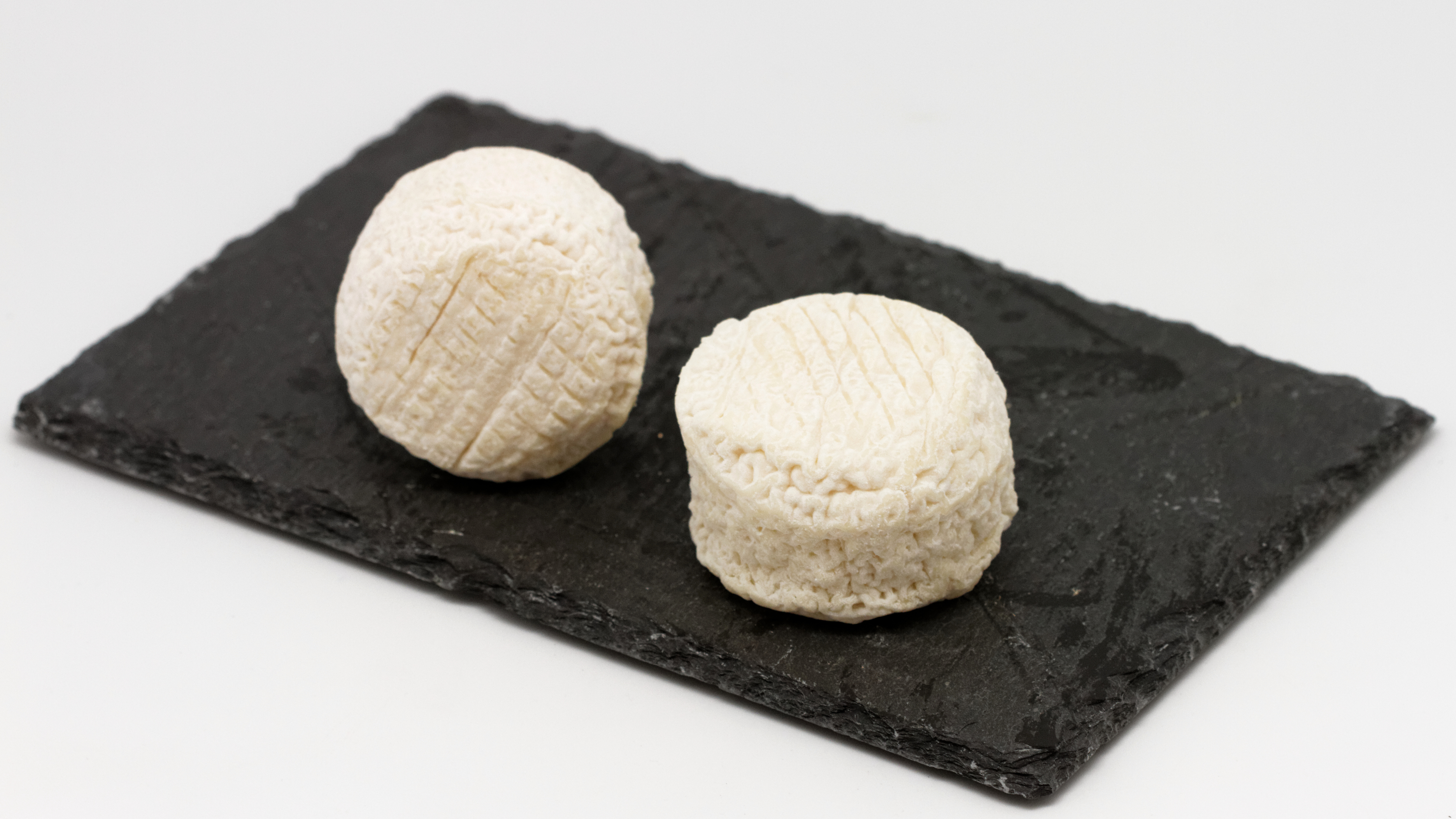
Crottin de Chavignol

- Crottin de Chavignol
- Dolaz cheese
- Faisselle – a non-protected French cheese made of raw milk from goats, cows or sheep
- Feta
- Formaela

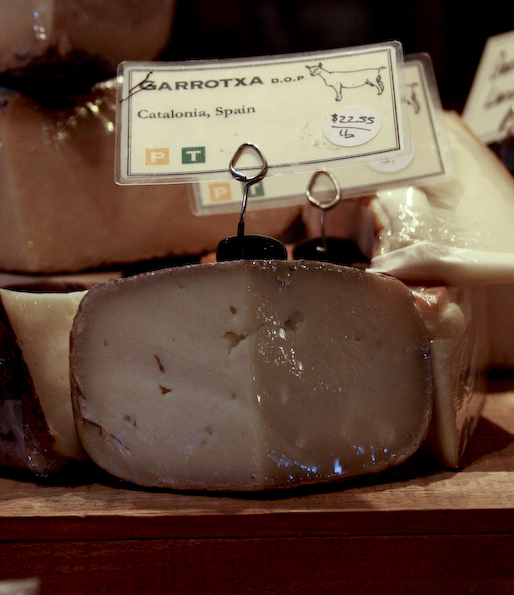
Garrotxa cheese

- Garrotxa cheese
- Gbejna friska - a fresh cheeselet similar to ricotta in texture - native to Maltese Islands
- Gbejna tal bzar - same as above but aged and coated in black pepper - native to Maltese Islands
- Gbejna mghoxxa - same as the fresh cheeslet but left to air dry - native to Maltese Islands
- Halloumi
- Jibneh Arabieh
- Jben- traditional Moroccan cheese made from pure goat or goat/cow mixed milk.
- Kars gravyer cheese
- Kasseri
- Kefalotyri
- Leipäjuusto

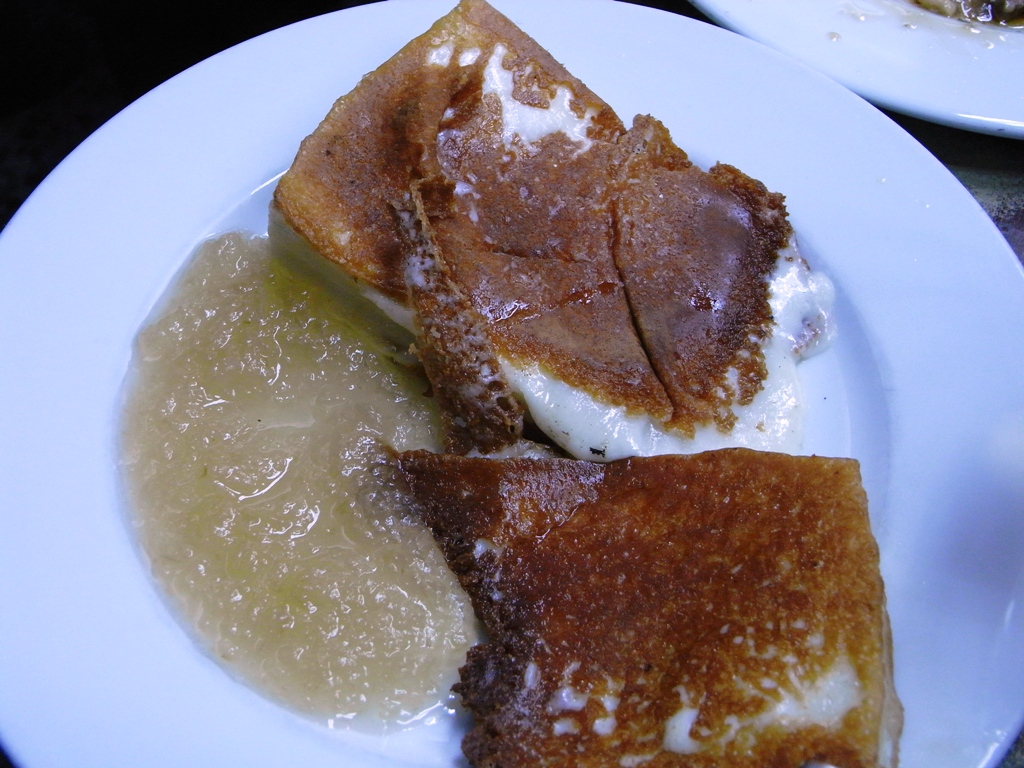
Majorero

- Majorero – from Spain, it is similar to Manchego, and is protected under European Law with Protected Designation of Origin (PDO) status.
- Manouri
- Mató
- Mizithra
- Nabulsi cheese
- Payoyo cheese
- Pélardon

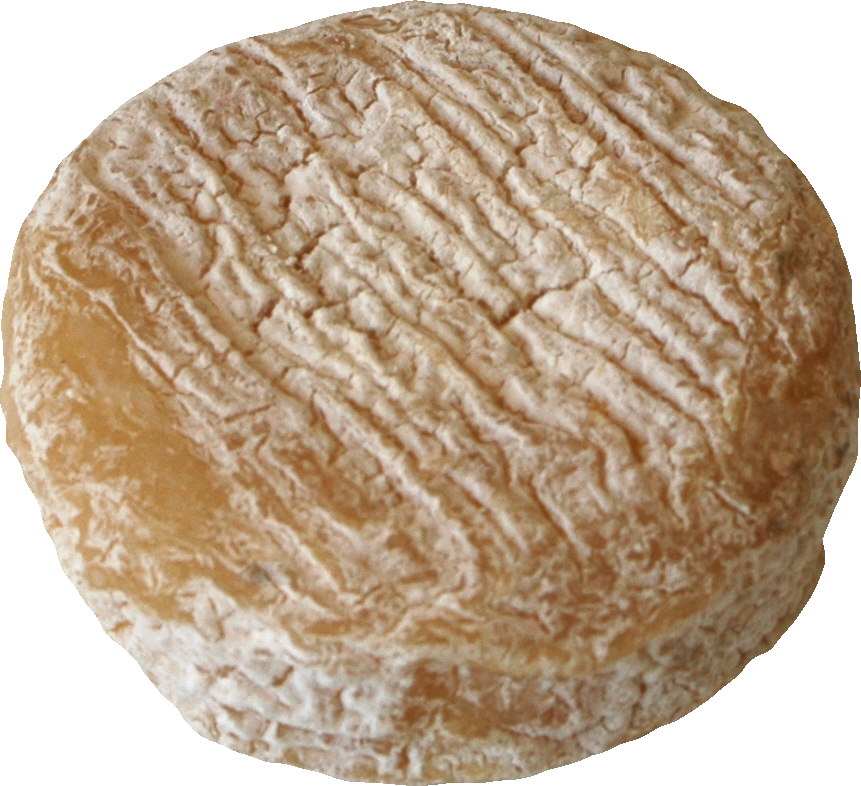
Picodon

- Picodon
- Picón Bejes-Tresviso
- Pouligny-Saint-Pierre cheese
- Rigotte de Condrieu
- Robiola
- Rocamadour cheese
- Rubing

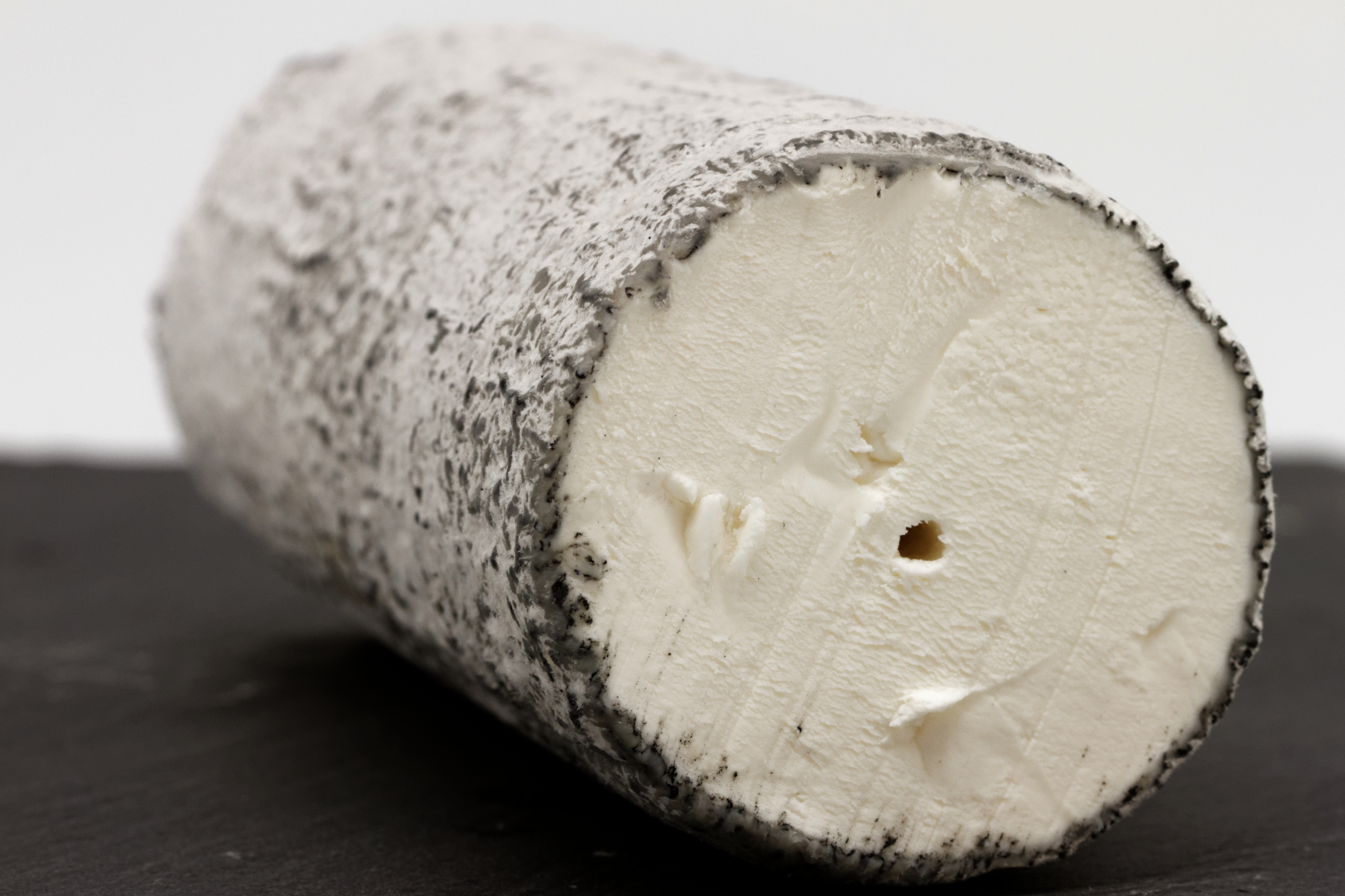
Sainte-Maure de Touraine

- Sainte-Maure de Touraine
- Santarém cheese
- Selles-sur-Cher cheese
- Snøfrisk
- Testouri
- Tulum cheese
- Valençay cheese
- Van herbed cheese
- Xynomizithra
- Xynotyro

== Commercial brands ==
- Ardagh Castle Cheese
- Ardsallagh Goat Farm
- Blue Rathgore
- Bluebell Falls
- Bonne Bouche
- Bouq Émissaire
- Capricious
- Chaubier – a washed rind French Cheese made from half goat's milk and half cow's milk
- Chavroux
- Chèvre noir
- Clochette
- Clonmore Cheese
- Cooleeney Farmhouse Cheese
- Corleggy Cheese
- Gleann Gabhra
- Glyde Farm Produce
- Harbourne Blue
- Humboldt Fog
- Kunik cheese
- Pantysgawn
- St Tola

== See also ==
- List of goat dishes
- List of cheeses
- List of dairy products
- Lists of prepared foods
