= Banon cheese =

French goat cheese

Banon
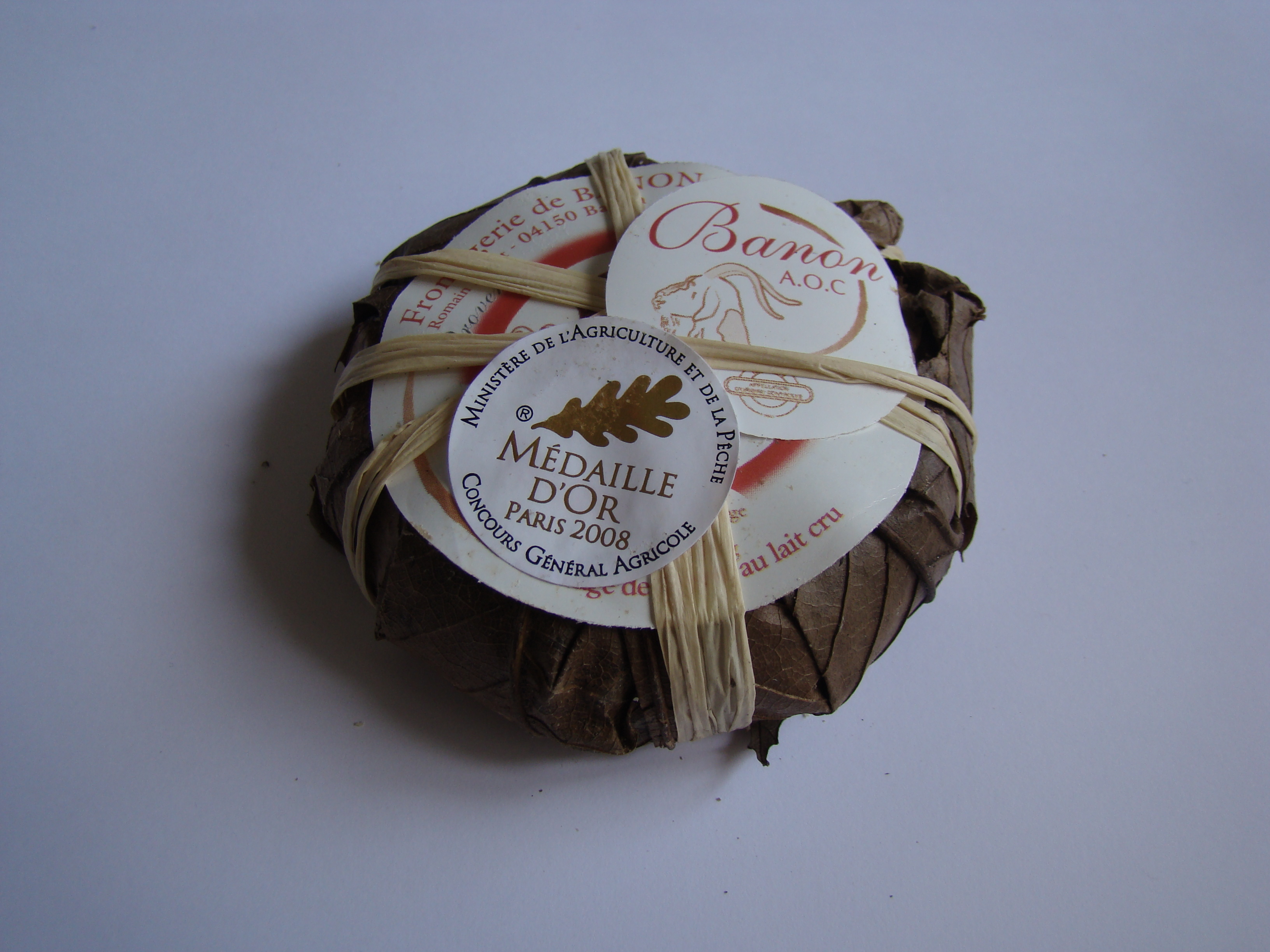
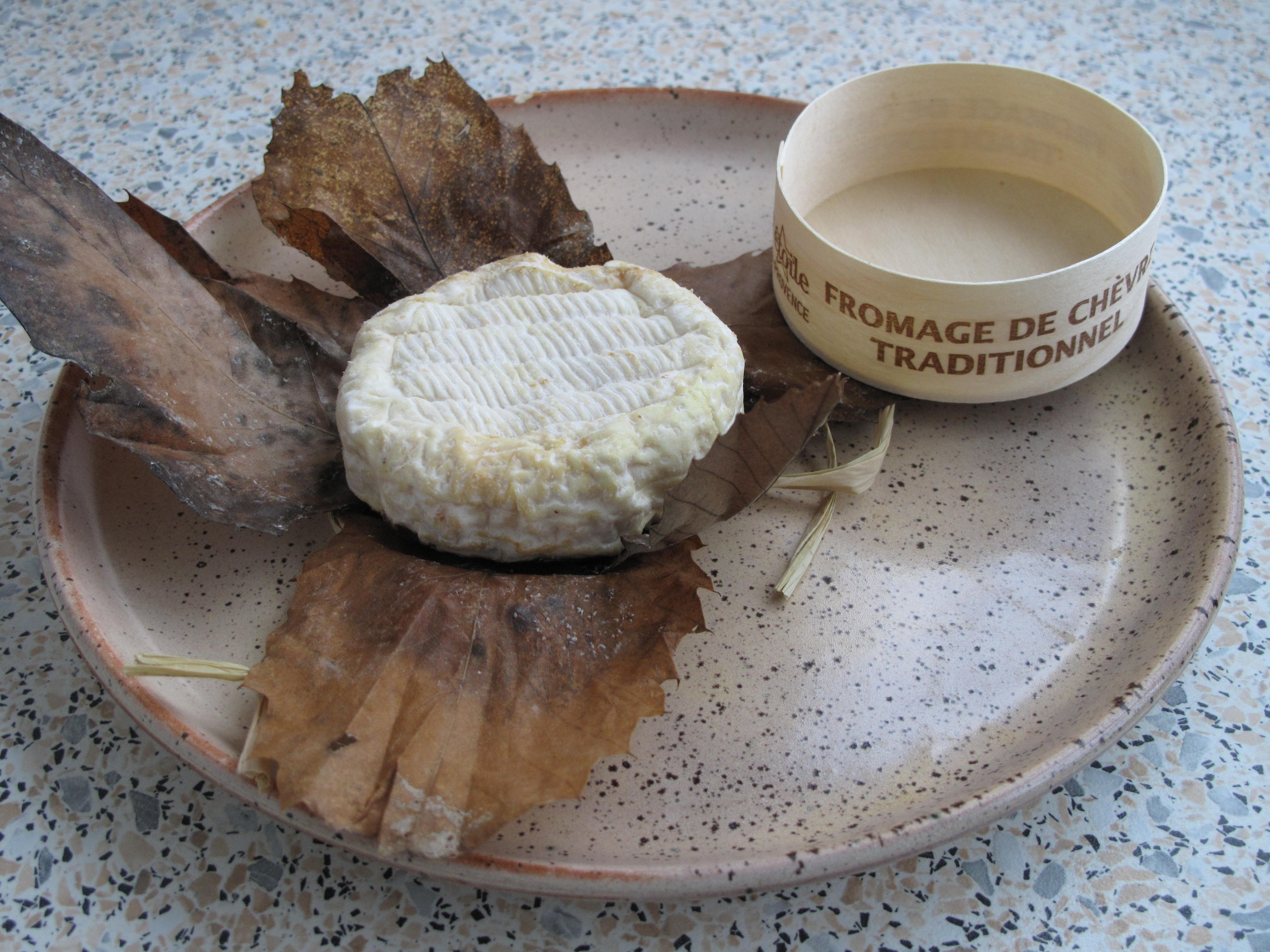
- Wrapped Banon Unwrapped Banon
- Country of origin: France
- Region, town: Alpes-de-Haute-Provence, Banon
- Source of milk: Goats
- Pasteurized: No
- Texture: Soft-ripened
- Aging time: at least 3 weeks
- Certification: French AOC 2003, PDO
- Named after: Banon

Banon (French pronunciation: [banɔ̃]) is a French cheese made in the region around the town of Banon in Provence, south-east France.

Also known as Banon à la feuille, it is an unpasteurized cheese made from goat's milk and is circular in shape, around 7 cm (2.8 in) in diameter and 2.5 cm (0.98 in) in height, and weighing around 100 g. This pungent uncooked, unpressed cheese consists of a fine soft white pâte that is wrapped in chestnut leaves and tied with raffia prior to shipment.

The Provençal specialty fromage fort du Mont Ventoux is created by placing a young banon in an earthenware jar. The cheese is then seasoned with salt and pepper, doused in vinegar and eau-de-vie and left in a cool cellar to ferment. The concoction will develop an increasingly fierce taste capable of lasting for many years.

== History ==
Small goat's cheeses have been made in the dry hills of Provence since Roman times. As it is sold today, the cheese was first made by a couple in the village of Puimichel near to the town of Banon in the département of Alpes-de-Haute-Provence.

== Manufacture ==
The affinage period lasts for two weeks, following which it is dipped in eau de vie and wrapped in chestnut leaves that have been softened and sterilized by boiling in a mixture of water and vinegar. The collection of leaves, which must be harvested when brown, takes place in the autumn during their fall. They are gathered by teams of seasonal workers on the Albion Plateau, in the Cévennes, in Corsica, and in Ardèche. The Fromagerie de Banon (responsible for 60% of the production) alone uses 5 million leaves per year.

Ready to be consumed, Banon cheese has the shape of a disc measuring 8 cm in diameter and 2 to 3 cm in height, with a weight of 100 g.

The cheese is at its best when made between spring and autumn.

Banon was awarded the Appellation d'Origine Contrôlée (AOC) label in July 2003. It is the first cheese from the Provence-Alpes-Côte d'Azur region to receive an AOC label. This recognition covers 111 communes in Alpes-de-Haute-Provence, 33 communes in Hautes-Alpes, 21 communes in Drôme, and 14 communes in Vaucluse, for a total of 179 communes authorized for milk production and cheese making.

Milk production, as well as the making and aging of the cheeses, must be carried out within the designated appellation area. Production levels are low, making this AOC one of the rarest and smallest in France in terms of volume. There are eighteen farm producers, two artisanal processors, and an annual production of 75 tonnes of cheese (80% from dairies and 20% from farms). Ten milk producers supply the two artisanal companies. The Banon Cheese Factory supplies barely 50 tonnes per year to the market.

== Gastronomy ==
=== Tasting ===
This cheese can be enjoyed on a slice of rustic country bread, accompanied by cherry or fig jam. It pairs well with white wines from Côtes-du-Rhône, Ventoux, or Luberon regions.

=== Banon Cheese Festival ===
Since 1993, the village of Banon has organized a festival celebrating its goat cheese every May. The event aims to pay tribute to this local specialty. The festival was canceled in 2020 due to health concerns related to the COVID-19 pandemic.

== See also ==
- List of goat milk cheeses
- Fontina
- Robiola
- Reblochon
- Stracchino
