= Picodon =

French goat cheese

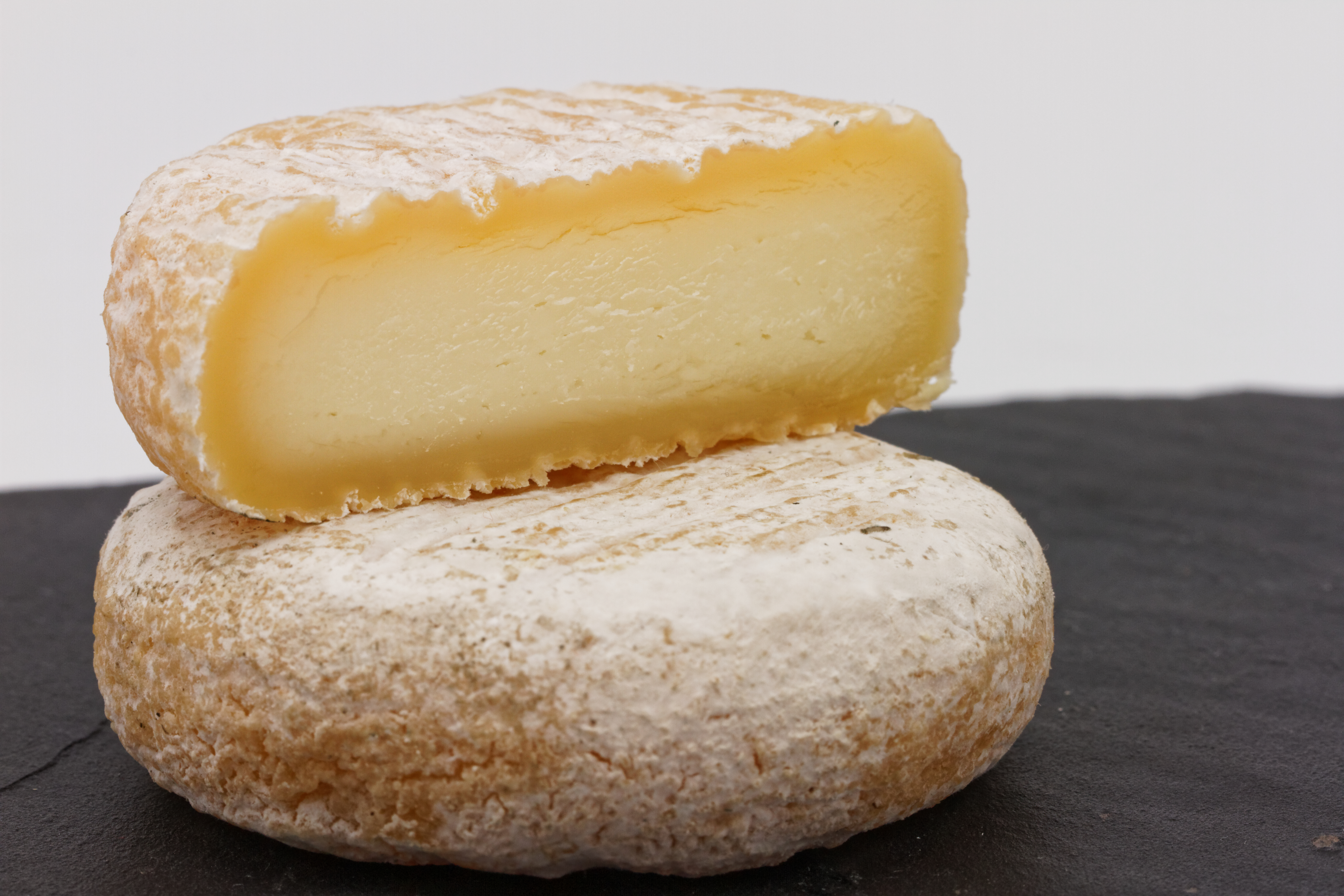
- Country of origin: France
- Region, town: Drôme, Ardèche
- Source of milk: Goats
- Pasteurised: No
- Texture: Soft/hard
- Aging time: 2-4 weeks
- Certification: French AOC 1983

Picodon (French pronunciation: [pikɔdɔ̃]) is a goats-milk cheese made in the region around the Rhône in southern France. The name means "spicy" in Occitan.

The cheese itself comes in a number of varieties, each small, flat and circular in shape varying from speckled white to golden in colour. Between 5 and 8 cm (2.0 and 3.1 in) in diameter and between 1.8 and 2.5 cm (0.71 and 0.98 in) in height, they range from around 40 to 100 grams. The pâte of the cheese is spicy and unusually dry, whilst retaining a smooth, fine texture.

Whilst young the cheese has a soft white rind and has a gentle, fresh taste. If aged for longer, the cheese can lose half of its weight resulting in a golden rind with a much harder centre and a more concentrated flavour.

== Varieties ==
Picodon is manufactured in a number of varieties, each conforming to the AOC regulations. These include:

- Picodon de l'Ardèche - (40-60g) the most common variety, with noticeable acidity.
- Picodon de Crest - (60g) made with the highest quality milk giving a stronger flavour.
- Picodon du Dauphiné - generally sold well matured.
- Picodon de Dieulefit - (40-90g) sold in both young and mature varieties.
- Picodon de la Drôme - (45g) low acidity, with both salty and sweet flavours.
- Picodon à l'huile d'olive - marinated in bay and olive oil.

== Manufacture ==
The lower valley of the Rhône is mostly too dry for the production of wine, but ideal for goats to feast on the sparse grass and hardy bushes that are scattered along the hillsides.

Picodon is made from milk with only a small quantity of rennet added before being poured into small moulds dotted with tiny holes. Lactic protein, frozen curd, and concentrated or powdered milk are all prohibited by regulation. The cheese is twice salted using fine, dry salt. The cheese is left to dry for at least fourteen days, although four weeks is more common.

Cheeses labelled with affinage méthode Dieulefit (after the commune of Dieulefit) indicates that the affinage included hand-washing the surface of the cheese with water, following which the cheese is left to mature in covered earthenware jars for at least a month.

Production is fermier, artisanal, and industriel, and the final product is a minimum of 45% fat. Picodon is manufactured throughout the year, although fermier production only occurs between spring and autumn. In total 584 tons were produced in 2005.

Manufacture primarily takes place in the departments of Ardèche and Drôme, though regulations also permit the canton of Barjac in Gard and Valréas in Vaucluse.

AOC status was granted in 1983.

== See also ==
- Pélardon
- List of goat milk cheeses
