= Kunik cheese =

Brand of American cheese

Kunik is a brand of cow and goat milk cheese. It is described by the producer as a semi-aged, triple cream wheel cheese made from 25% Jersey cow cream and 75% goat's milk. It has an edible, bloomy white rind; a tangy, buttery flavor; and a thick, smooth, creamy texture. The addition of high-milkfat Jersey cow cream makes the cheese more rich and flavorful than a brie cheese, but less pungent than a pure goat cheese. Anne Saxelby, reviewing the cheese for Esquire, stated "it may very well be the sexiest cheese in the U.S.A."

== Production ==
Kunik is produced at Nettle Meadow Goat Farm in Thurman, New York. The farm is essentially an animal sanctuary, funded by the income from cheese sales.

== See also ==
- List of cheeses
- List of goat milk cheeses
