= Vermont Creamery =

Creamery and butter maker in Websterville, Vermont

Coordinates: 44°10′17″N 72°29′16″W

Vermont Creamery is a creamery and artisanal cheese and butter-maker in Websterville, Vermont, USA. It was founded in 1984 by business partners Allison Hooper and Bob Reese. Previously known as the Vermont Butter and Cheese Company, the company adopted its current name in 2013.

== History and products ==
The creamery produces a variety of fresh and aged dairy products from cows' and goats' milk. Cow cream and butter products sold by the company are crème fraîche, crème fraîche-vanilla and cultured butter. Cows' fresh cheese products sold by the company are fromage blanc, mascarpone and quark. Goats' aged cheese products sold by the company are bijou, Bonne Bouche, Coupole and Cremont. Goats' fresh cheese products sold by the company are creamy goat cheese, feta, fresh crottin, fresh goat cheese and fresh goat cheese-crumbled.

Cows' milk is sourced from the St. Albans Cooperative Creamery in St. Albans, Vermont, while goats' milk is sourced from approximately 20 Vermont farms and Hewitt's Dairy in Hagersville, Ontario, Canada. In 2012, Vermont Creamery launched the Ayers Brook Goat Dairy initiative, with the goal of becoming the first goat dairy demonstration farm in the United States.

The company was initially based in Brookfield, Vermont, where it began in a small barn by Hooper's house, before moving to larger premises in Websterville in 1989. In 2014, the Creamery employed approximately 45 individuals.

The company introduced the French fromage blanc to the United States and is well known for this cheese. The Bonne Bouche, another signature product, is an "ash-dusted" goats' cheese.

On March 29, 2017, Hooper announced they were selling Vermont Creamery to Land O'Lakes.

== See also ==
- List of cheesemakers
