= Santarém =

Santarém may refer to:

== Places ==
- Santarém, Pará, Brazil
- Santarém District, a district in Portugal
- Santarém, Portugal, Capital of the Ribatejo province
- Roman Catholic Diocese of Santarém, Portugal

== Other ==
- Santarém cheese, a Portuguese goat cheese
- Santarém, an alternative name for the Portuguese wine grape Periquita
- João de Santarém, a 15th-century Portuguese explorer
