= Bouché =

Bouché may refer to:

== People ==
- Auguste Bouché-Leclercq (1842–1923), French historian
- Carl David Bouché (1809–1881), German botanist and gardener
- Claudine Bouché (1925–2014), French film editor
- Donatien Bouché (1882–1965), French Olympic sailor
- Louis Bouché (1896–1969), American muralist
- Peter Friedrich Bouché (1785–1856), German botanist and entomologist, uncle of Carl David
- René Bouché (c. 1905–1963), artist and fashion illustrator

== Music ==
- A French term for hand stopping

== See also ==
- Bonne Bouche, a type of goat cheese
- La Bouche, German-American dance music duo
