= Bucheron =

French goat cheese

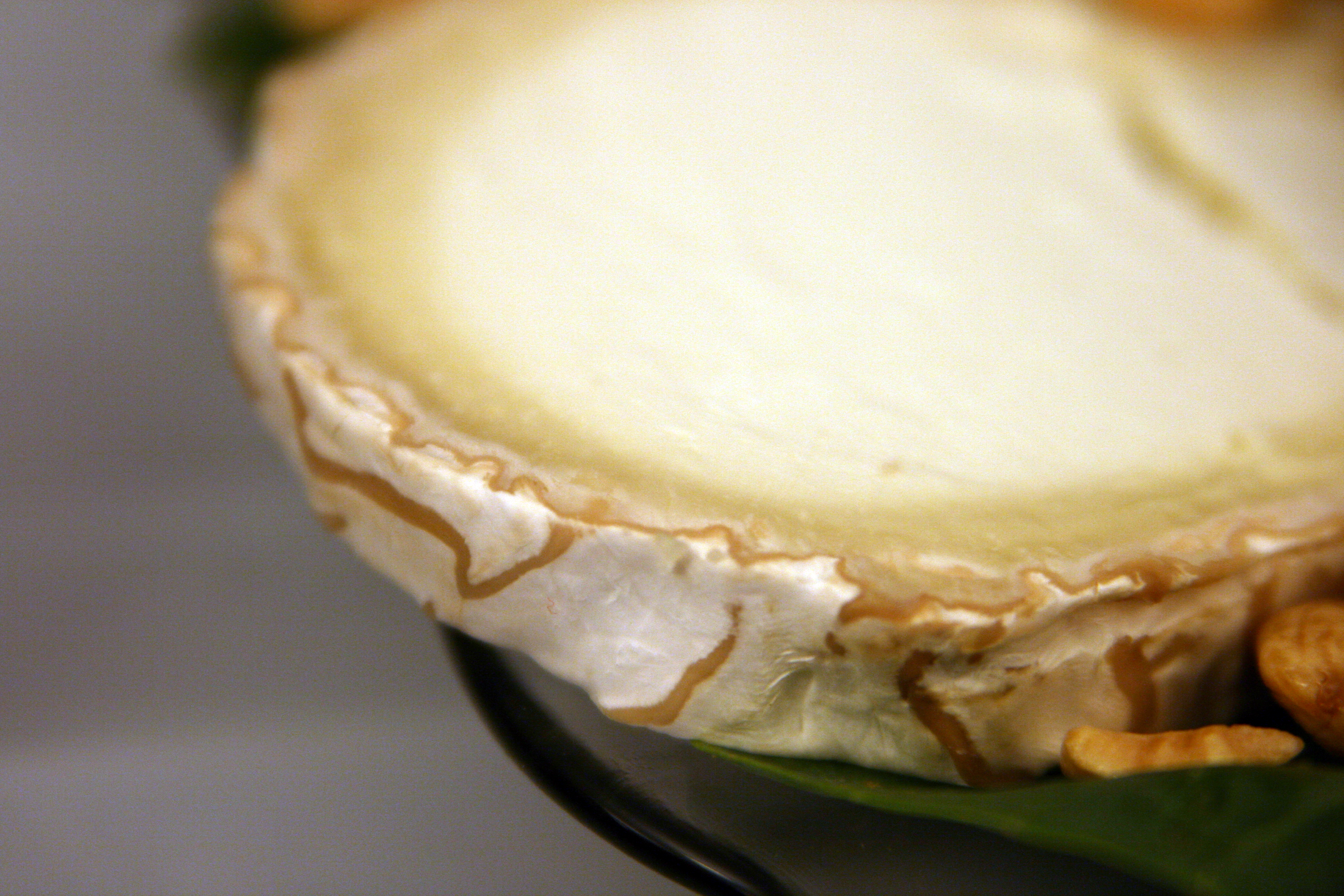
Edge of boucheron

Bûcheron (sometimes Boucheron, Bucherone, Boucherond, or Bucherondin) is a goat's milk cheese native to the Loire Valley in France. Semi-aged, ripening for 5 to 10 weeks, Bucheron is produced as short logs that weigh 3 to 4 pounds (1.4 to 1.8 kg) that are sliced and sold as small rounds in food stores.

Bûcheron has an ivory-colored centre surrounded by a bloomy white rind. Soft, but semi-firm in texture, this cheese when young has a mild taste and it has a harder texture. As it ages, is gets a softer texture and a sharper, more intense taste. It is a good cheese for salads or for snacking with hearty grained breads, crackers, grapes and fresh figs.

The French word bûcheron means "woodcutter" or "lumberjack".

== See also ==
- List of goat milk cheeses
