= Garrotxa cheese =

Spanish goat cheese

Garrotxa
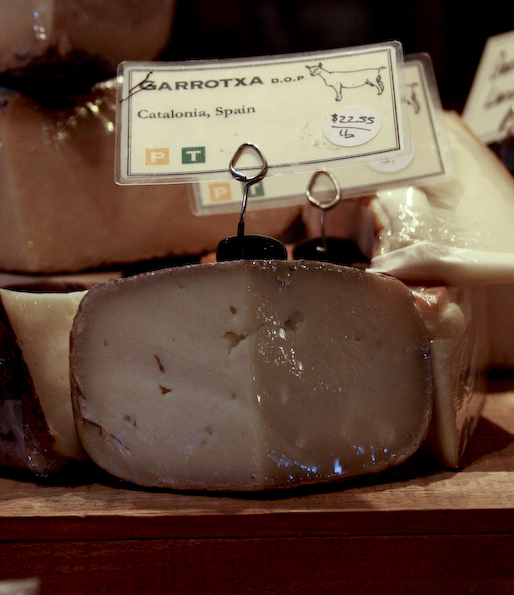
- Country of origin: Spain
- Region, town: Garrotxa, Catalonia
- Source of milk: Goats
- Pasteurized: Yes
- Texture: Semifirm
- Aging time: 1 to 2 months
- Certification: PGI (2022)

Garrotxa is a traditional Catalan goat cheese. Almost extinct by the early 1980s, it has been revived by a young cheesemakers and goat farmers' cooperative in the Garrotxa area of Catalonia. The revival began in 1981, and the cheese has since become widespread in artisanal production.

Garrotxa is traditionally made from the milk of Murciana goats and aged in caves to enhance mold development and the resulting flavor. Garrotxa is described as having a powdery gray or grayish-blue rind, a firm texture, an ivory-colored interior, and an earthy flavor. The cheese is semi-soft. Cheese wheels of Garrotxa are small (typically around three pounds) and mature relatively quickly in the humid Pyrenees. Maturing time varies, but is typically between four and eight weeks. The cheese is pasteurized.

Garrotxa pairs well with crusty country bread, pears, and nuts, such as toasted hazelnuts, or almonds or walnuts. It may be served as tapas or at the end of a meal. Garrotxa is sometimes described as a dessert cheese. The cheese is mildly acidic.

Wine pairing include white wines such as a Catalan Priorat, or Pinot Gris, Verdejo, or Chardonnay with "texture to complement the cheese's buttery sweetness," or fino or dry amontillado sherry, to bring out the cheese's nuttiness.

As of 2010, some Catalans were seeking designation of origin status for Garrotxa. Garrotxa received the Protected Geographical Indication (PGI) status on 11/13/2022

== In popular culture ==
Garrotxa was used to create a hole in a sail by firing it from a cannon, by MythBusters (ep. 128), to declare "plausible" the apocryphal tale of Captain Coe and the Battle of the Cheese.

== See also ==
- List of goat milk cheeses
