= Chevrotin =

French goat cheese

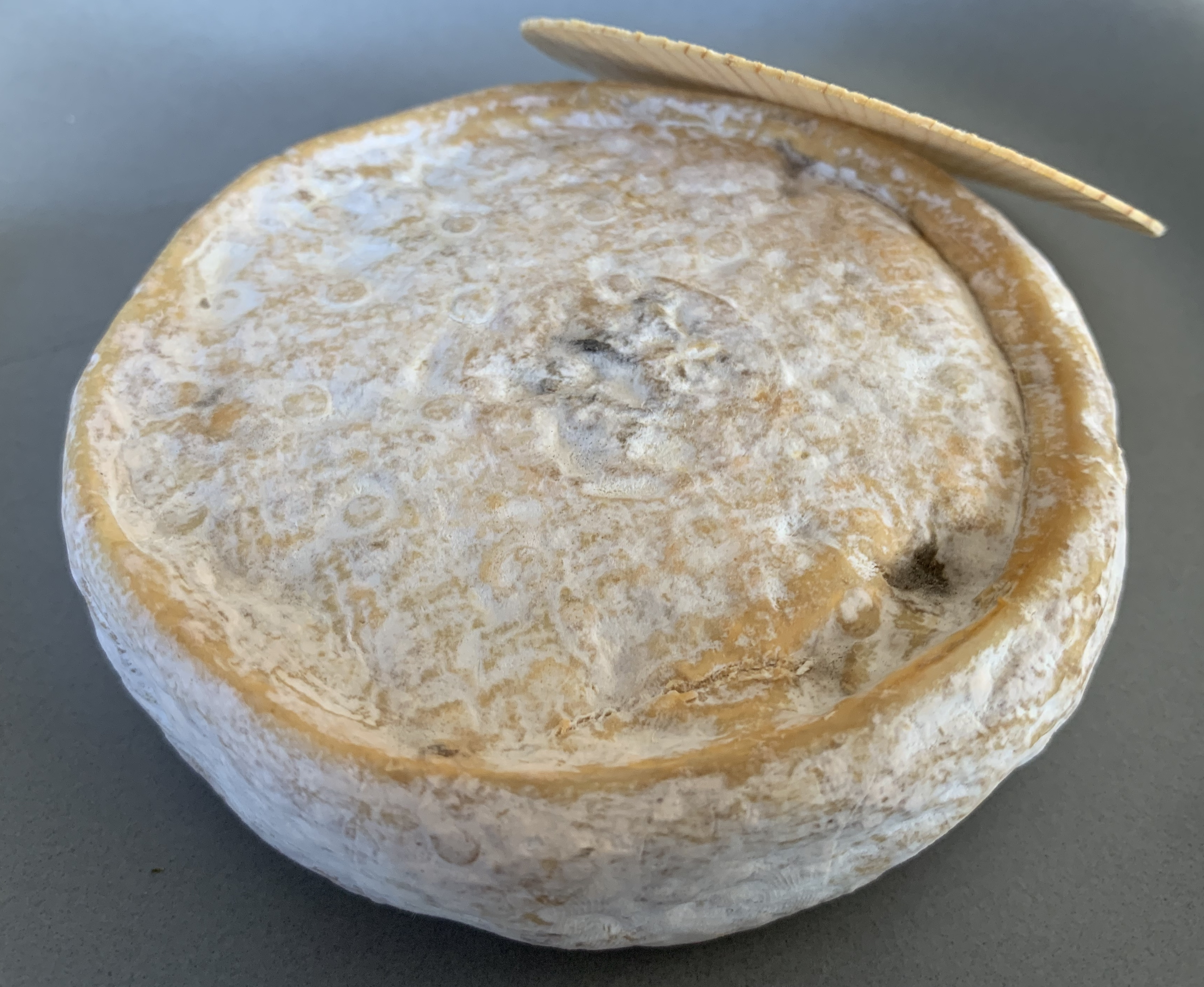
A wheel of chevrotin

Chevrotin (French pronunciation: [ʃəvʁɔtɛ̃]) is a soft goat milk based cheese produced in the historical region of Savoy (France). Since 2002 it has had an AOC designation.

== Production ==
Chevrotin has been produced since the 17th century in the Alpine foothills of the Savoyard Chablais, Bauges and Aravis districts. The landscape presents difficulties to agriculture, with steep gradients, a damp climate and a thin limestone-based soil that supports a restricted vegetation. The only domesticated animals that can feed here are goats that are able to move around with the same sure-footedness as the chamois who live nearer the mountain peaks. Chevrotin is made from filtered but unpasteurised goat milk. In order to produce cheese meeting the AOC criteria, the milk must be produced by a herd of 80% alpine breed goats.

The cheese is a fresh cheese with only a brief maturation period. Production tends to be a small-scale artisanal process. At a minimum, it needs three weeks to ripen. This takes place on pine timber shelves, and during ripening time each cheese is turned and washed with brine three times per week. Chevrotin received the Appellation d'Origine Contrôlée (AOC) and protected designation of origin (AOP) in 2002.

== Appearance ==
The cheese takes the form of a flattened cylinder, with a diameter of 9 – 12 cm and a thickness of 3 – 4½ cm. It generally weighs 250 - 350 g. Chevrotin features a thin coating of soft reddish-brown, not unlike the rind of such better known cheeses as Munster. Chevrotin appears similar to Reblochon which is made in the same regions of Savoy, applying similar processes, but which is produced lower down the valleys using cow's milk.

== Taste ==
The cheese has a full flavor with an aromatic sourness reminiscent of the wild herbs included in the spring and summer diets of the mountain goats. Chevrotin can be eaten with bread at breakfast, or as part of a cheese-board at the end of a main meal. The best season during which to eat chevrotin is generally between May and September, approximately five weeks after manufacture, but it can be enjoyed any time between April and November.

During the winter months, the goats are housed in sheds. Their winter diet of hay does not produce the subtle herb based flavor for which enthusiasts value chevrotin.

== See also ==
- List of cheeses
- List of French cheeses
- List of goat milk cheeses – Cultured products of milk of domestic goats
