= Chabis =

French goat cheese

Chabis is a French cheese with a delicate flavour and a texture that becomes firmer as it matures.

Chabis is a soft cheese produced without heating or pressing, using goat's milk. It features a "croûte fleurie" coating of soft white mould reminiscent of such better known cheeses as Camembert.

Originating in the Nouvelle-Aquitaine region of western France, the cheese is formed in small discs each of approximately 100 g. Both farm-produced and factory-manufactured versions exist.

The best time of year for Chabis is between April and August, though it can be enjoyed through from March until December. Ideally, the cheese should be left to ripen for about twenty days following manufacture. Herbs and spices are frequently added to the cheese for taste.

== See also ==
- List of goat milk cheeses
