= Cypress Grove Chevre =

American cheese company

Cypress Grove
- Founded: 1983
- Headquarters: Arcata, California, USA
- Products: Goat cheese
- Owner: Emmi
- Website: www.cypressgrovecheese.com

Cypress Grove is a cheese manufacturer located in Arcata, California. They specialize in goat cheeses including the award-winning Humboldt Fog.

== History ==
Cypress Grove was founded in 1983 in McKinleyville, California, by Mary Keehn. In 2004, they moved operations to nearby Arcata as part of an expansion.

On August 22, 2010, Cypress Grove was acquired by Swiss company Emmi. Operations stayed in Arcata.

== See also ==
- List of cheesemakers
