= Chèvre noir =

Brand of Canadian goat cheese

Chèvre noir is a firm pasteurized goat's milk cheese made by Fromagerie Tournevent in Chesterville, Quebec, Canada. Launched in 1988, Chèvre Noir is made in the style of a cheddar but from goat's milk. The cheese was created by cheesemaker Louise Lefebvre, who has been at Tournevent since 1984. It is coated with black wax and its aroma is reminiscent of cheddar.

== See also ==
- List of cheeses
- List of goat milk cheeses
