= Chavroux =

Brand of French goat cheese

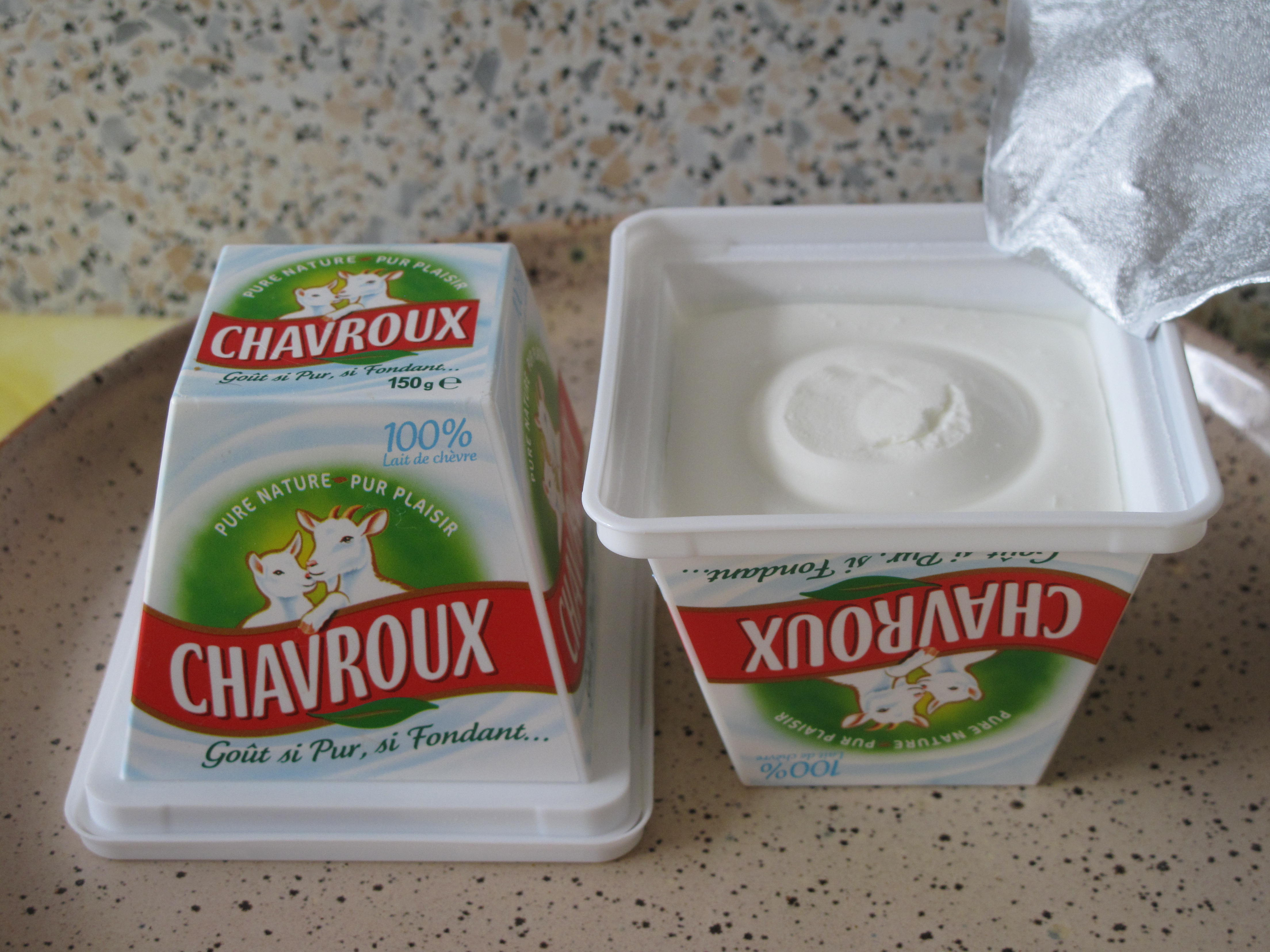
Chavroux in the form of a topless pyramid

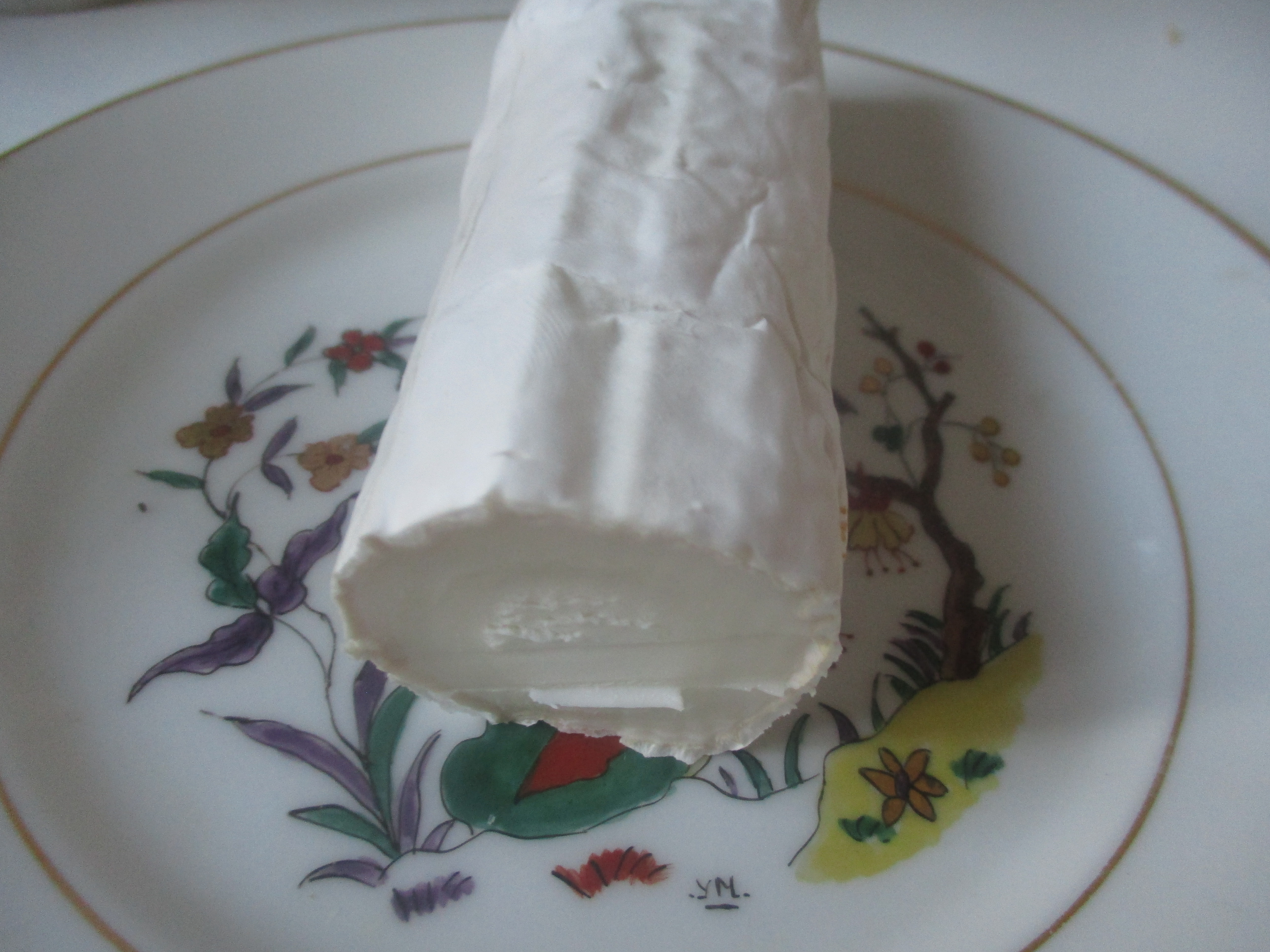
Chavroux in the form of a cylinder

Chavroux is a French factory produced soft cheese made using goat's milk.

The cheese is sold, most usually, in small containers in the form of a truncated pyramid, each of 150 g, or in the form of a cylinder. It can be eaten all round the year and is recommended for eating with salads, but can also be used with any meal as a form of cheese spread.

Chavroux was launched in 1985 and is manufactured in a small factory that employs approximately 200 people, making the plant the leading employer in the village of Réparsac, some 11 km (6.8 mi) from Cognac.

The business is owned by Savencia, a producer of a wide range of specialist cheeses and France's second largest cheese producer overall.

== See also ==
- List of goat milk cheeses
