= Coulommiers cheese =

French soft ripened cheese

Coulommiers
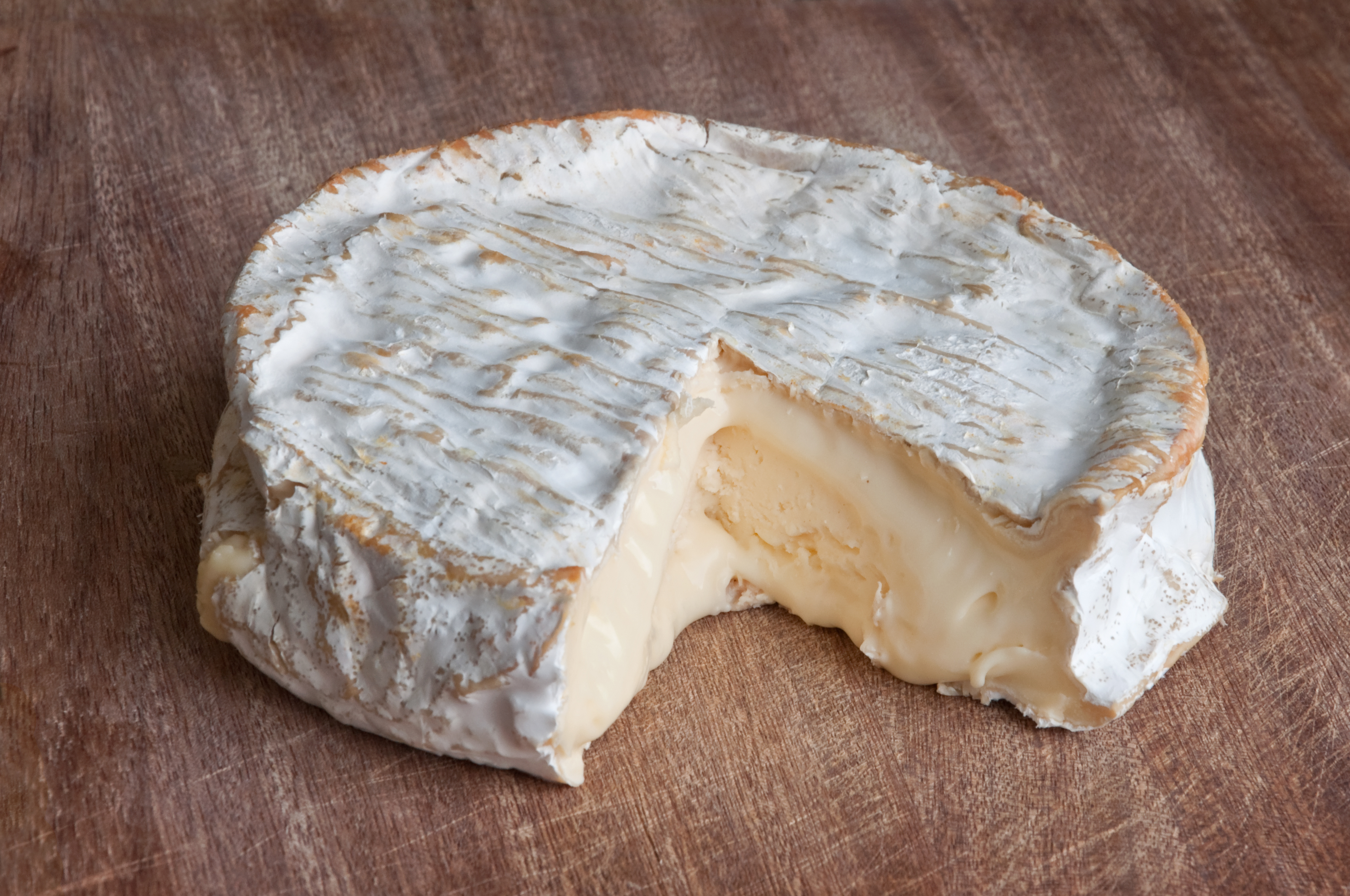
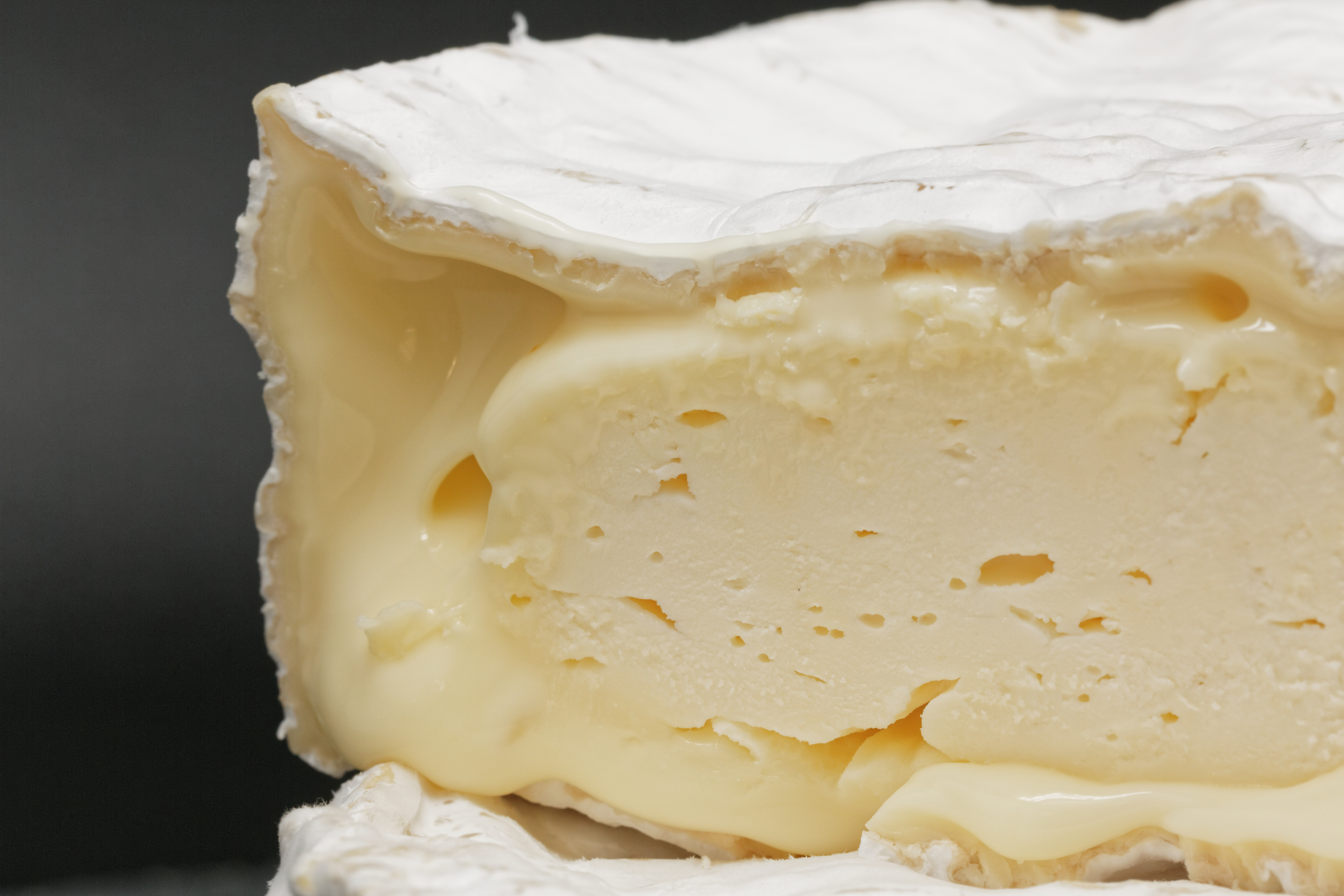
- Coulommiers Texture of Coulommiers
- Country of origin: France
- Region: Coulommiers
- Source of milk: Cows
- Pasteurized: yes or no
- Texture: Soft
- Dimensions: 13 cm (5.1 in)
- Weight: 12 oz (340 g)
- Aging time: 3-8 weeks
- Named after: Coulommiers

Coulommiers (French pronunciation: [kulɔmje]) is a soft ripened cheese from Coulommiers, Seine-et-Marne, France. It is made from cow's milk, and is usually in the shape of a disc with white, bloomy, edible Penicillium candidum rind. When produced as an artisanal or "farmhouse" cheese from unpasteurized milk, it has some reddish blush in parts of the rind. The period of ripening when made of pasteurised whole milk is about four to six weeks. The fat content is 40 per cent.

Coulommiers is a lesser-known cousin of Brie, although it has been produced for longer. It is smaller and thicker than Brie and with a nuttier flavour, but otherwise has similar characteristics, with a similar buttery colour and supple texture. The cheese may be either farmer-made or industrially produced; however, the industrial version lacks the depth of an unpasteurized cheese. Because it is not an AOC cheese, producers can make it with pasteurized milk and export it to the United States.

== History ==
In 1930, there were 250 cheesemakers coming from Coulommiers, selling their cheese to "affineurs" at the Coulommiers market every Wednesday. In 1946, affineurs started to make cheese. Meanwhile, the number of cheesemakers declined; there were only 60 left in 1946. They were all making brie de Coulommiers (by definition) of different sizes, but only the specific size, diameter 13 to 15 cm (5.1 to 5.9 in), was unique to the Coulommiers market. Today, this cheese is commonly called Coulommiers. In 2008, local councillors led by Franck Riester, Deputy Mayor, and journalists launched the PDO project to raise the importance of a unique Coulommiers cheese.

== See also ==
- List of cheeses
