= Robiola =

Italian soft cheese

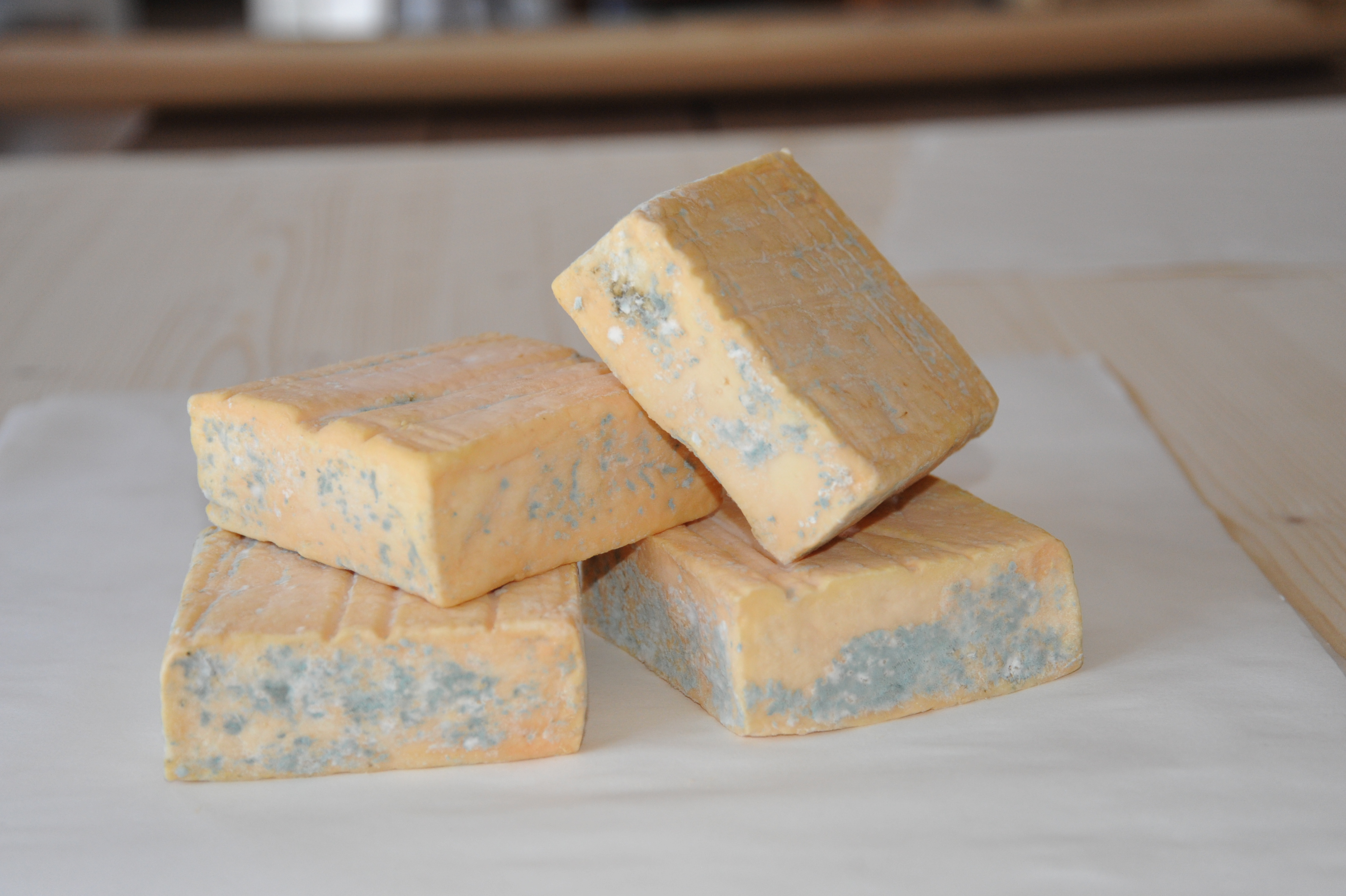
- Robiola della Valsassina
- Country of origin: Italy
- Region: Lombardy; Piedmont
- Source of milk: Cows, goats, sheep or a blend
- Pasteurized: Best if not pasteurized, though can be with live lactic yeasts blended in
- Texture: Soft-ripened
- Aging time: None to 20 days
- Certification: Robiola di Roccaverano: DOC/PDO

Robiola is an Italian soft-ripened cheese of the stracchino family. It is from the Langhe region and made with varying proportions of cow's, goat's, and sheep's milk. One theory is that the cheese gets its name from the comune (municipality) of Robbio, in the province of Pavia; another that the name comes from the word rubeole (ruddy) because of the color of the seasoned rind.

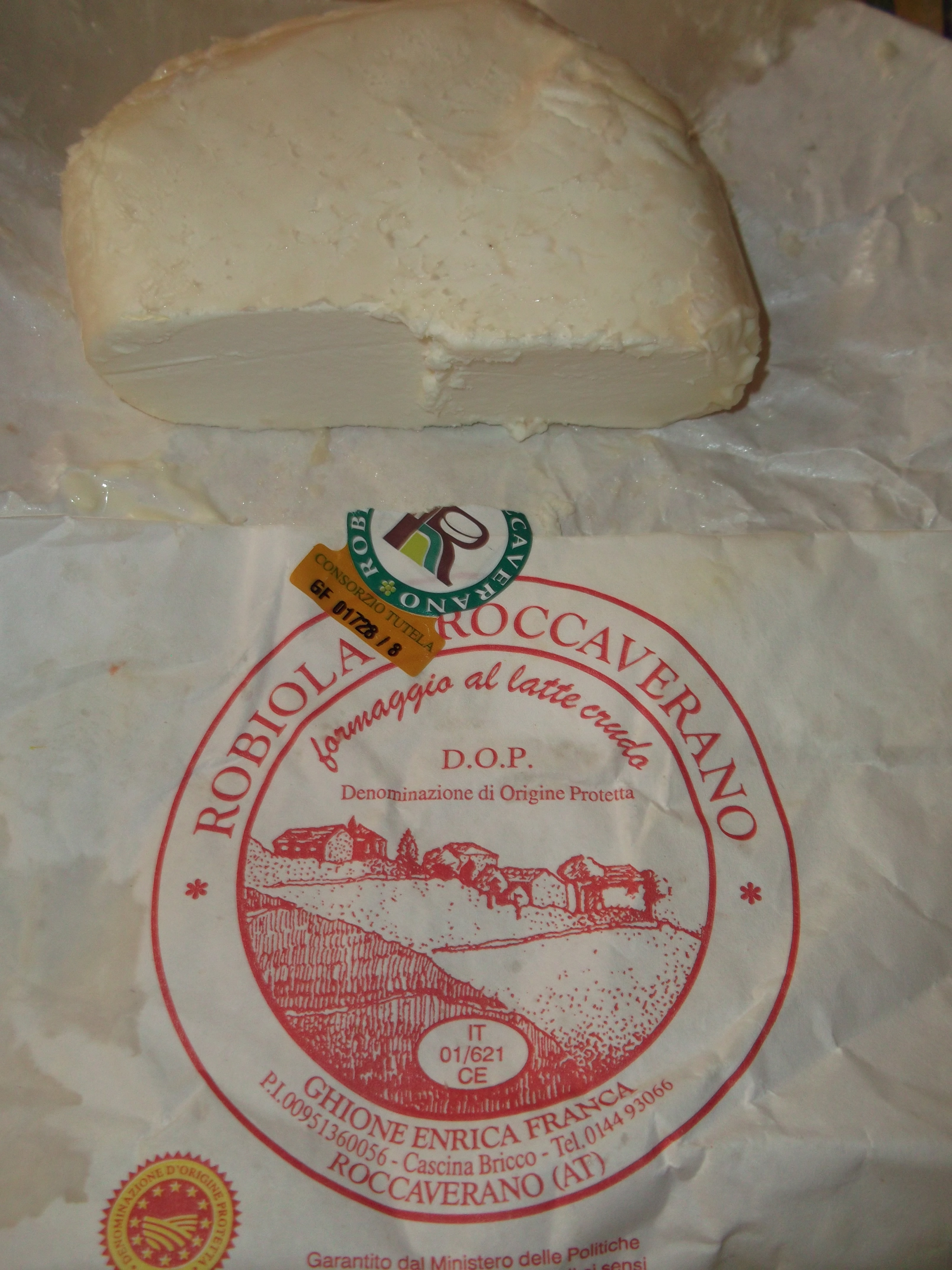
Robiola di Roccaverano

Varieties of robiola are produced across Piedmont from the provinces of Cuneo, Asti and Alessandria and into Lombardy. It is one of the specialties of the Aosta Valley. The taste and appearance of robiola vary depending on where it was produced. Robiola di Roccaverano DOC/PDO has no rind and a slightly straw-yellow coloring with a sweet, yielding taste. Robiola Lombardia has a thin, milky-white to pink rind and tends to be shaped like small rolls. The cream-colored cheese underneath its bloomy rind has a smooth, full, tangy and mildly sour flavor, probably due to the high (52%) fat content. Its rind can be cut away, but is mild with no ammonia and adds a subtle crunch to the cheese. La Tur has a cake-like rind over a tangy-lactic layer of cream and is representative of Piedmont's robiola style of cheese where the fresh curds are ladled into molds, and drained under their own weight before aging rather than by pressing with weights. Robiola from the Piedmont region is a fresh cheese, and is usually eaten on its own, or with a little honey.

The cheese has a long history that is sometimes traced back to the Celto-Ligurian farmers of the Alta Langa: the virtues of cheese from Ceba (today Ceva) were extolled by the first-century Pliny the Elder in his Natural History, but any identification of that cheese with the robiola of today must be speculative. However, in his Summa Lacticiniorum, the fifteenth-century dairy produce expert Pantaleone da Confienza did describe the manufacture, and praise the quality, of a cheese with this name.

== See also ==
- List of Italian cheeses
