= Couronne lochoise =

French goat cheese

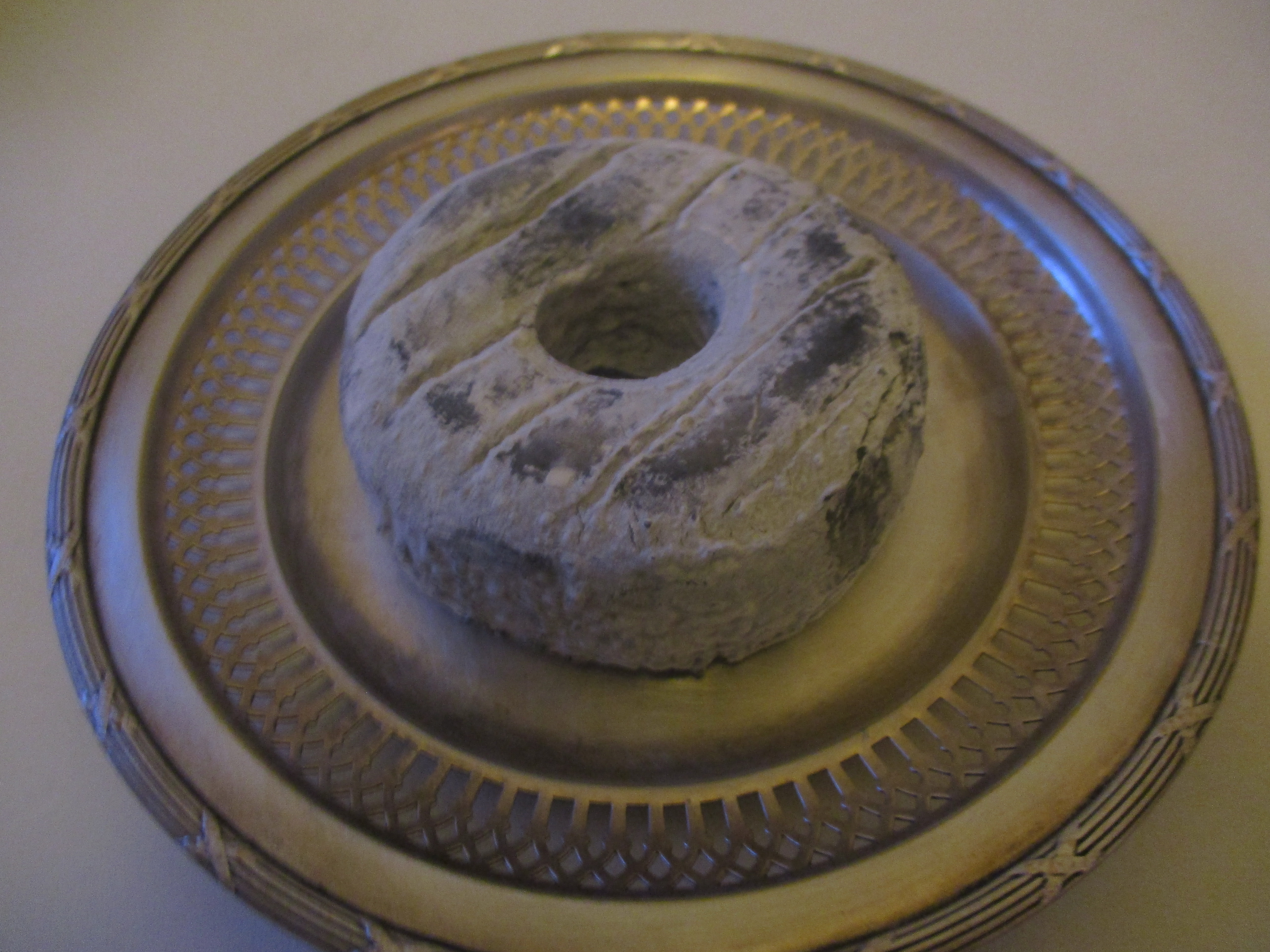
Couronne lochoise.

Couronne lochoise is a soft and creamy raw goat's milk cheese originating in the farmlands of the Loches area of Touraine in the Loire Valley, France. Its name translates to "Crown of Loches". It is made in donut-like moulds, covered in vegetable ash and aged for at least ten days. Its texture and taste resembles that of buttered pastry.

== See also ==
- List of goat milk cheeses
