= Humboldt Fog =

Brand of American goat cheese

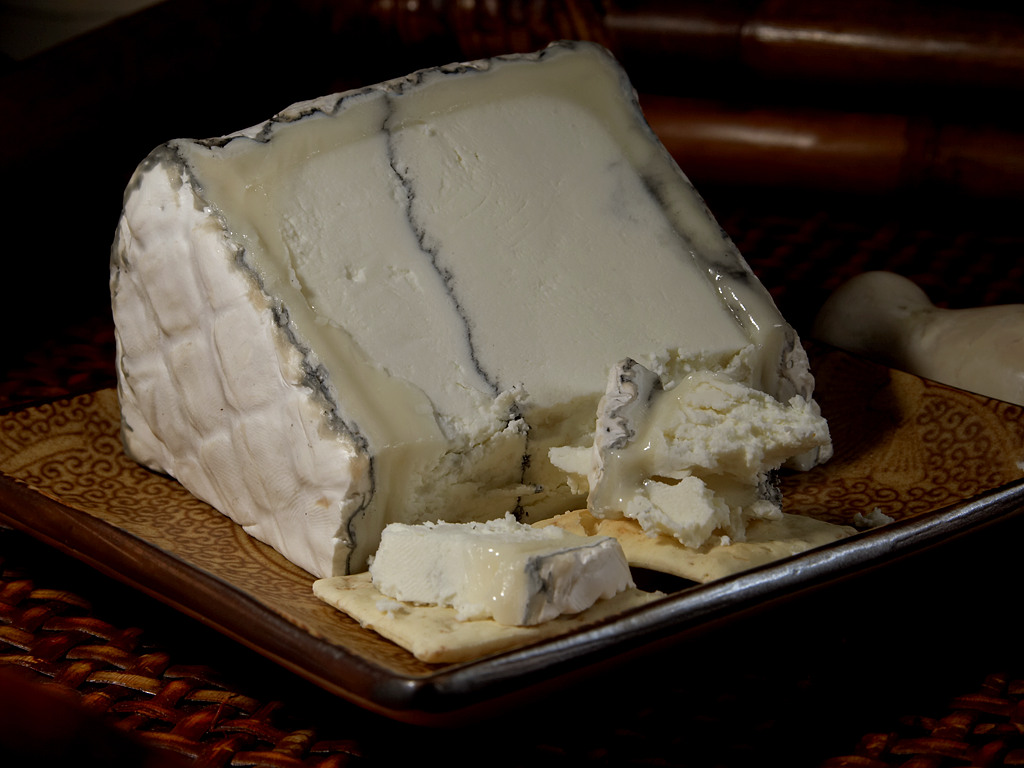
- Country of origin: United States
- Region, town: California
- Town: Arcata, Humboldt County
- Source of milk: Goats
- Pasteurized: Yes
- Texture: semi-soft
- Aging time: 60 days
- Certification: None

Humboldt Fog is a goat milk cheese made by Cypress Grove, of Arcata, California, in Humboldt County. It is named for the local ocean fog which rolls in from Humboldt Bay. It is an uncooked pressed cheese made from pasteurized goat's milk.

Humboldt Fog is a mold-ripened cheese with a central line of edible white ash much like Morbier. The cheese ripens starting with the bloomy mold exterior, resulting in a core of fresh goat cheese surrounded by a runny shell. As the cheese matures, more of the originally crumbly core is converted to a soft-ripened texture. The bloomy mold and ash rind are edible but of minute distinct taste. The cheese is creamy, light, and mildly acidic with a stronger flavor near the rind.

This cheese won first-place awards from the American Cheese Society in 1998, 2002 and 2005.

== See also ==
- List of American cheeses
- List of goat milk cheeses
