= Cathare =

French goats' milk cheese

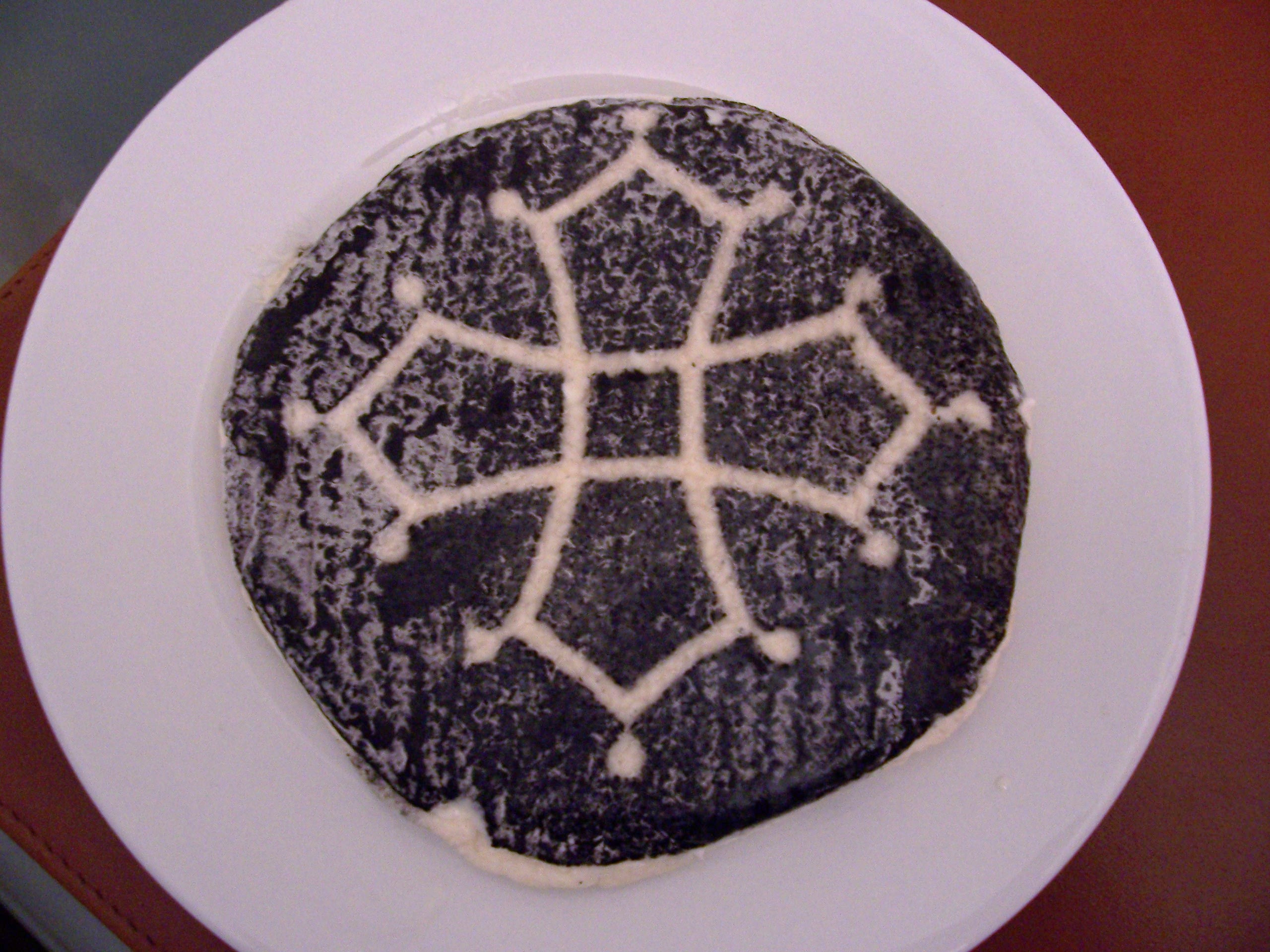
- Country of origin: France
- Source of milk: Goat

Cathare (Occitan: Catara) is a goat's milk cheese from the Languedoc-Roussillon region of France. The cheese comes in flat discs whose face is covered in charcoal powder with the Occitan cross inscribed. Under the rind, Cathare is pure white with a soft, creamy texture. Its goat-milk flavor intensifies as it ages, and reaches its prime after two to three weeks, which makes it typically unavailable in the United States, due to the Food and Drug Administration's stance that raw milk soft cheeses can pose a health risk. The sale of raw milk cheese aged under 60 days is illegal in the United States.

== See also ==
- List of goat milk cheeses
