= Majorero =

Spanish goat cheese

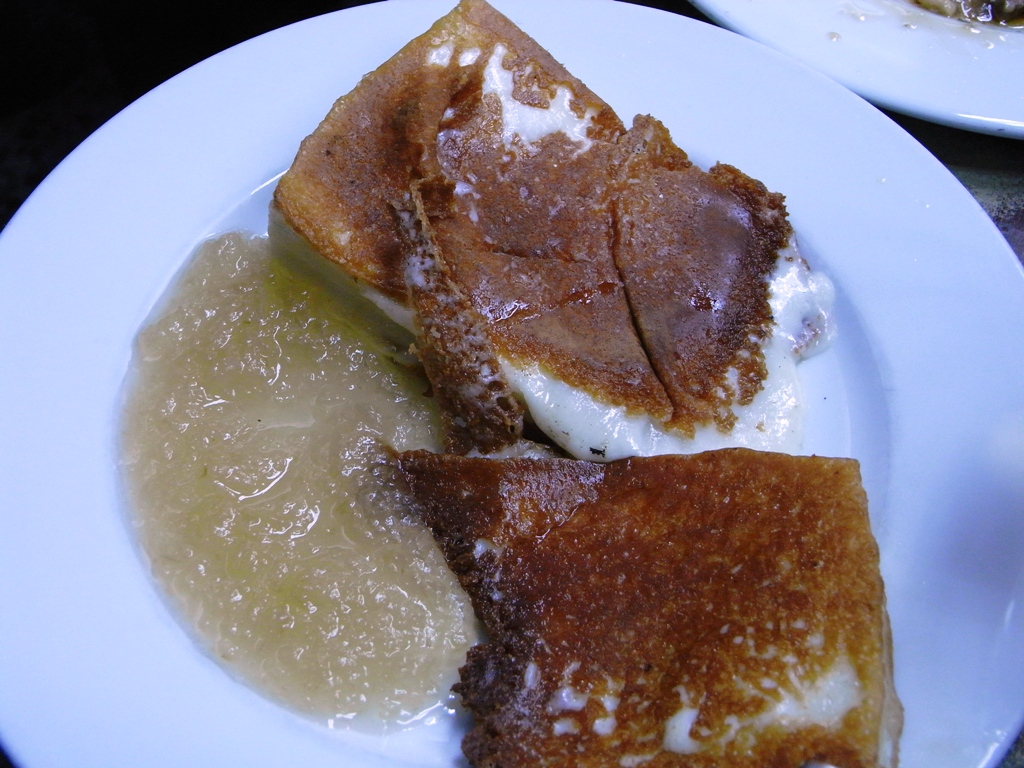
- Country of origin: Spain
- Region: Canary Islands
- Source of milk: Goat
- Pasteurised: No
- Texture: Semi-hard
- Certification: PDO
- Named after: Fuerteventura

Majorero (Spanish: [maxoˈɾeɾo]) is a goat milk cheese from Spain. Similar to Manchego, this firm cheese has a milky, nutty flavour that goes well with various pear products. It is pale white in colour, and comes in large wheels. Currently, it is protected under European Law with Protected Designation of Origin (PDO) status.

Majorero comes from the island of Fuerteventura in the Canary Islands. The word Mahorero (Majorero) is a Guanche word still used today to describe the people of Fuerteventura. This island has a rich farming tradition, and goats were very important to their economy. It is from the Majorera goat that this particular cheese is made. The goat produces a thick, aromatic and high-fat milk.

Majorero cheese is usually available in three ways: in its natural rind rubbed with oil, rubbed with pimenta, or with roasted gofio. The cheese has a slightly gummy texture. The taste is acidic, with a buttery but not salty taste. This cheese is very versatile, and can be used with pastas, potatoes and many vegetables.

After milking, lamb rennet is added and after an hour a curdle develops. This curdles must be beaten and drained to remove the whey. The cheese is then heavily pressed and shaped. Dry salt is rubbed on the top. The cheese must be aired for several days before it can be eaten, or it can be set in dry rooms to age. After ageing, the cheese can be rubbed with oil or gofio to prevent excessive drying and give it different tastes and textures.

== See also ==
- List of cheeses
- List of goat milk cheeses
