= Bouq Émissaire =

Brand of Canadian goat cheese

Bouq Émissaire is a raw milk goat cheese with an ash-covered rind made by Fromages Chaput of Châteauguay, Quebec, Canada. It is aged by Dépendances du Manoir of Brigham, Quebec. The name is a misspelling of the French term for "scapegoat".

== See also ==
- List of goat milk cheeses
- List of cheeses
