= Santarém cheese =

Portuguese goat cheese

Santarém
- Country of origin: Portugal
- Source of milk: Goat
- Texture: Semi-hard

Santarém is a goat cheese from Portugal produced in several different regions, most notably in the Santarém district and in Serra de Santo António in the Ribatejo province of Portugal.

It is considered to taste best ripe after aging, in servings of between 50 and 100 grams (1.8 and 3.5 oz). Best production practices call for it being preserved in good quality edible oil.

== See also ==
- List of goat milk cheeses
