= Pélardon =

French goat cheese

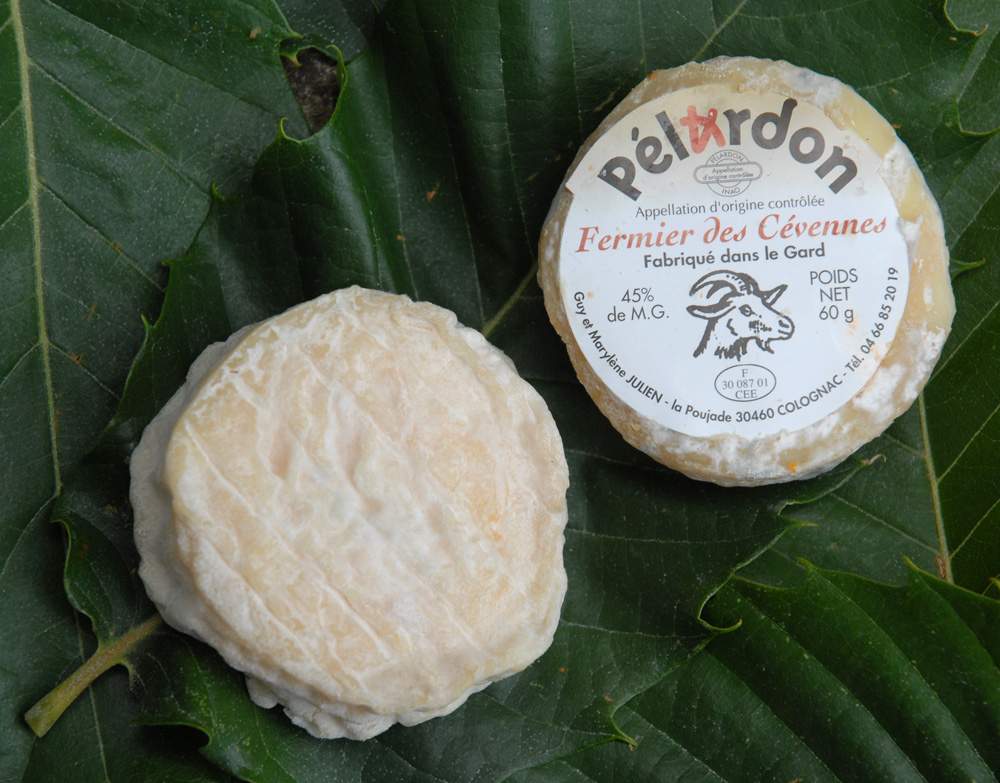
- Other names: paraldon, pélardou, péraudou
- Country of origin: France
- Region: Cévennes range, Languedoc-Roussillon
- Source of milk: Goats
- Dimensions: 60-70 mm (diameter) x 22-27 mm (height)
- Weight: 60 grams

Pélardon (French pronunciation: [pelaʁdɔ̃]), formerly called paraldon, pélardou and also péraudou, is a French cheese from the Cévennes range of the Languedoc-Roussillon region. It is a traditional cheese made from goat's milk. It is round soft-ripened cheese covered in a white mold (à pâte molle à croûte fleurie) weighing approximately 60 grams, with a diameter of 60–70 mm and a height of 22–27 mm. Pélardon has benefited from Appellation d'origine contrôlée (AOC) status since August 2000.

== See also ==
- List of goat milk cheeses
