= Chabichou =

French goat cheese

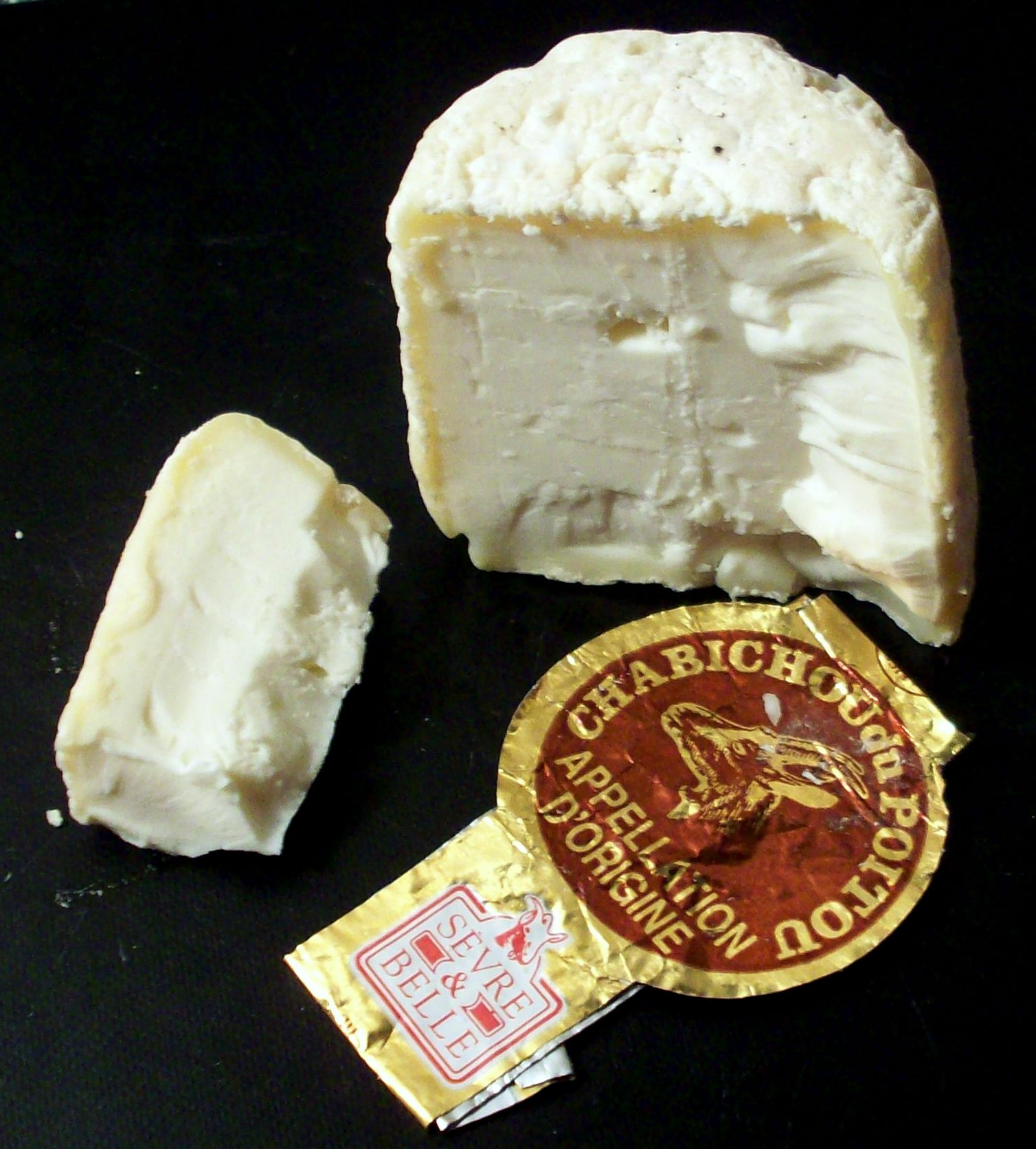
- Other names: Chabichou du Poitou
- Country of origin: France
- Source of milk: Goats
- Pasteurized: Sometimes
- Texture: Semi-soft

Chabichou (French pronunciation: [ʃabiʃu]; also known as Chabichou du Poitou) is a traditional semi-soft, unpasteurized, natural-rind French goat cheese (or Fromage de Chèvre) with a firm and creamy texture. Chabichou is formed in a cylindrical shape which is called a "bonde", per the shape of the bunghole of a wine barrel. and is aged for 10 to 20 days. It is the only goat cheese that is soft ripened allowed by Protected Designation of Origin regulations to be produced using pasteurized milk. Chabichou is very white and smooth, and flexible to the palate, with a fine caprine odor.

== History ==
The legend of Chabichou goes back to 732, at the time of the defeat of the Arabs in the area, in the 8th century, after the Battle of Poitiers. Many of them left the area but some settled there with their families and, in particular, their goat herds. The countryside was appropriate for grazing the "poor man's cow", as the pastures were excellent. The cheese was then named cheblis ("goat", in Arabic), which would become "chabichou" thereafter. However, the domestication of the goat in this area is supposed to date back to Roman colonization, and extends up to the present.

== Le Chabichou du Poitou ==
Chabichou du Poitou, made exclusively in the north of Nouvelle-Aquitaine region, acquired its AOC status in 1990 with the assistance of the efforts of Ségolène Royal. It is known for its characteristic label. Its production rose to 555 tons in 2003.

Since 1782, Chabichou du Poitou has been mentioned in the French "Guide du voyageur à Poitiers et aux environs". When regional wine production slowed in the late 1800s due to the European phylloxera crisis, production of Chabichou increased; production increased again with the development of the cooperative dairies (1906 in Bougon).

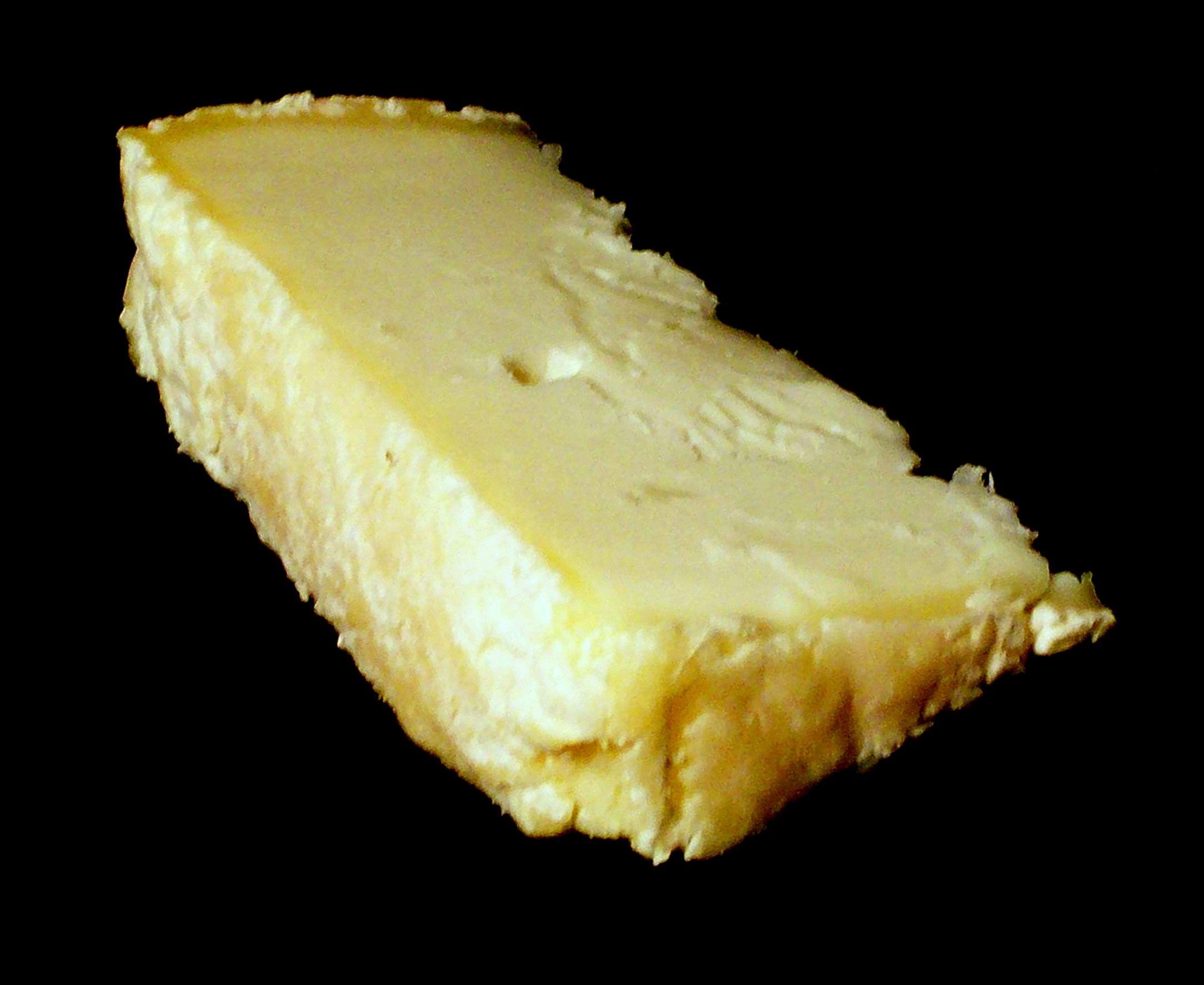
A small slice of Chabichou du Poitou AOC cheese.

The AOC production zone is limited to an area south of Haut-Poitou: the south of Vienne, the Deux-Sèvres and the north of the Charente. See the official website of Chabichou du Poitou at http://www.chabichou-du-poitou.eu..

== Manufacture ==
Chabichou of Poitou is made of fresh and whole goat's milk. It is quickly but slightly pressurized: less than 100 microliters per liter of milk. They then let the milk coagulate during a 24-hour period between 20 and 22 °C. This curd is then moulded manually with a ladle or mixer into perforated and truncated moulds and left to drain for another 18 to 24 hours while turning it over it two or three times, maintaining it at 22 °C. Afterwards, they are removed from the moulds and salted with dry salt or sometimes in a brine bath. It is then laid out in drying rooms, i.e. it is drained while being placed in moulds for 24 to 48 hours. Afterwards it is left to mature in cellars at between 10 and 12 °C and within 80% to 90% humidity. It remains there for at least 10 days, but generally for two or three weeks. Some are even preserved for months for a more vigorous flavor.

== See also ==
- List of goat milk cheeses
