= Bonne Bouche =

Brand of American goat cheese

- Country of origin: United States
- Region, town: Vermont
- Source of milk: Goat
- Pasteurised: Yes
- Texture: semi-soft
- Fat content: 21%
- Weight: 4 ounces
- Aging time: 10 days (plus up to 90 days in stores)
- Certification: None

Bonne Bouche is an aged goat's milk cheese made by Vermont Creamery, of Websterville, Vermont, United States. "Bonne bouche" is French for "tasty bite".

Made with fresh pasteurized goats’ milk from Vermont and Canadian farms, the curd is hand ladled, sprinkled with poplar ash, and aged to develop a rind. This cheese develops a wrinkled, geotrichum-rind also known as a "geo" rind. After aging for ten days at the creamery, the cheeses are packaged and sent to market where they will continue to age up to eighty days. As a young cheese, the rind has a pleasant yeast flavor and creamy interior becoming softer and more piquant with time.

== Awards ==
- 2011 — Soft goats’ milk cheese plain, mold ripened: World Cheese Awards
- 2012 — Best Cheese or Dairy Product: Fancy Food Show
- 2013 — 1st Place American Originals Recipe: American Cheese Society

== See also ==
- List of goat milk cheeses
