= Dolaz cheese =

Sheep or goat cheese from Turkey

- Country of origin: Turkey
- Region, town: Isparta, Afyon and Antalya

Dolaz cheese is a traditional cheese produced from whey by nomad (Karakoyunlu, Hayta, Honamlı, Sarıkeçili Yörüks) in the Lakes region (Isparta, Afyon and Antalya) in Turkey. It is generally made from ewe's and goat's milk.

== See also ==
- Turkish cuisine
