= Circassian cheese =

Type of cheese common in the North Caucasus

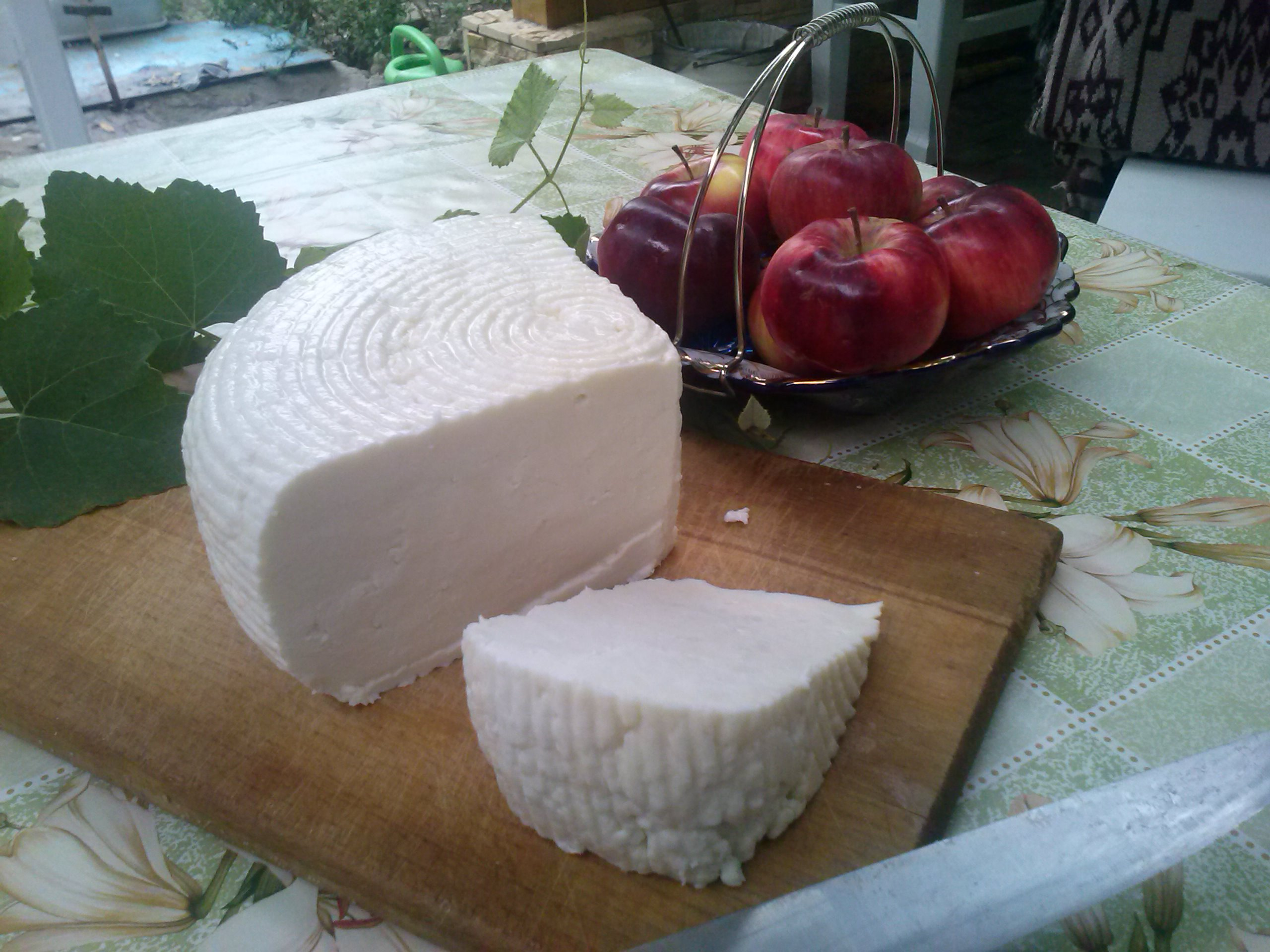
- Country of origin: North Caucasia
- Region: Circassia
- Source of milk: Cow, sheep or goat milk
- Pasteurised: Depends on variety
- Texture: Depends on variety

Circassian cheese (Adyghe: адыгэ къуае Adyghe pronunciation: [aːdəɣa qʷaːja], Russian: адыгейский сыр adygeyskiy syr), is a cheese found across the North Caucasus, the Levant and other areas with a Circassian diaspora.

The cheese is prepared with raw cow, sheep and/or goats milk (Adyghean cheese - only with cow milk) and molded into a wooden basket. Circassian cheese is a mild type of cheese that does not melt when baked or fried, and can be crumbled. Circassian cheese is often consumed fresh, or after having been dried by the sun or in the oven. There is also a smoked Circassian cheese.

There is an annual festival for Circassian cheese in Maykop, the capital of the Republic of Adyghea, Russia, held during the Circassian cultural festival with participants from different regions in the North Caucasus, competing in producing the best types of Circassian cheese.

The small Circassian community in Israel, most of whom live in Kfar Kama and Rehaniya in the Upper Galilee, operates boutique dairies that produce traditional Circassian cheese.
