= Bloomy rind =

Cheese rind that is soft and fluffy and white in color

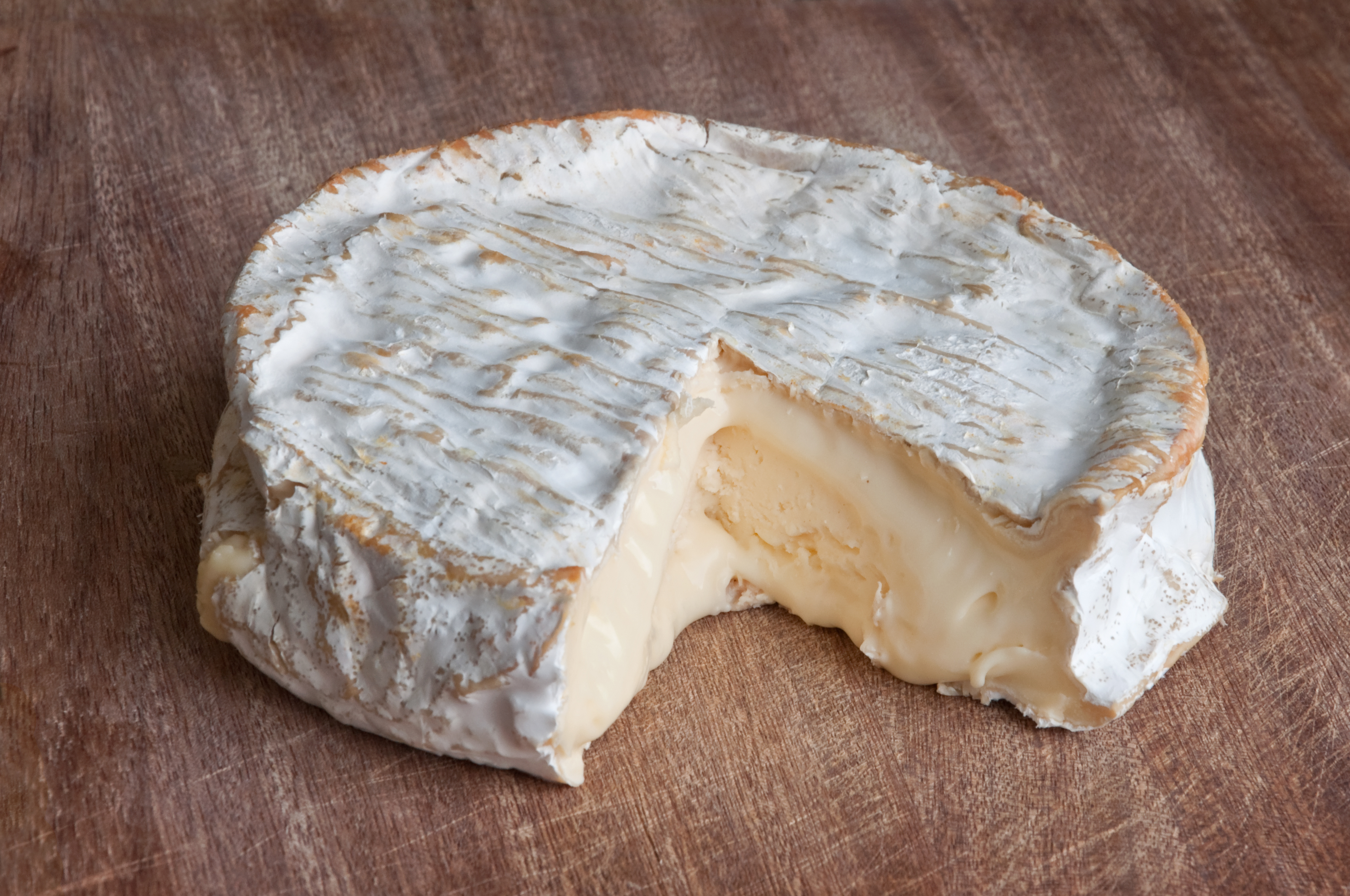
- A Coulommiers cheese with a bloomy rind
- Source of milk: Any milk
- Texture: Creamy

A bloomy rind is an edible white cheese rind that is soft and fluffy. Cheese that uses Penicillium camemberti is prone to developing bloomy rind. Bloomy rind cheese can be described as having "mild and lactic" flavors that may resemble onion or mushroom. They are described as being "ripened from the outside", and usually have creamy textures.

Brie is a type of cheese prone to bloomy rind. Chabichou du Poitou, Crottin de Chavignol, Humboldt Fog, and Camembert are also known for their bloomy rinds.

== See also ==
- Types of cheese
