= Circassian smoked cheese =

North Caucasian cheese

- Country of origin: North Caucasia
- Region: Circassia

Circassian smoked cheese is a smoked low-fat Circassian cheese, especially produced in the eastern Marmara region of Turkey. It is light yellow or cream-colored with a thick crust. After curdling and straining, the bottom and top of the cheese are salted and it is smoked with pinewood or thick pitch pine in smoking rooms. This process makes the cheese both more flavorful and more long-lasting.

== See also ==
- List of smoked foods
