= Crottin de Chavignol =

French goat cheese

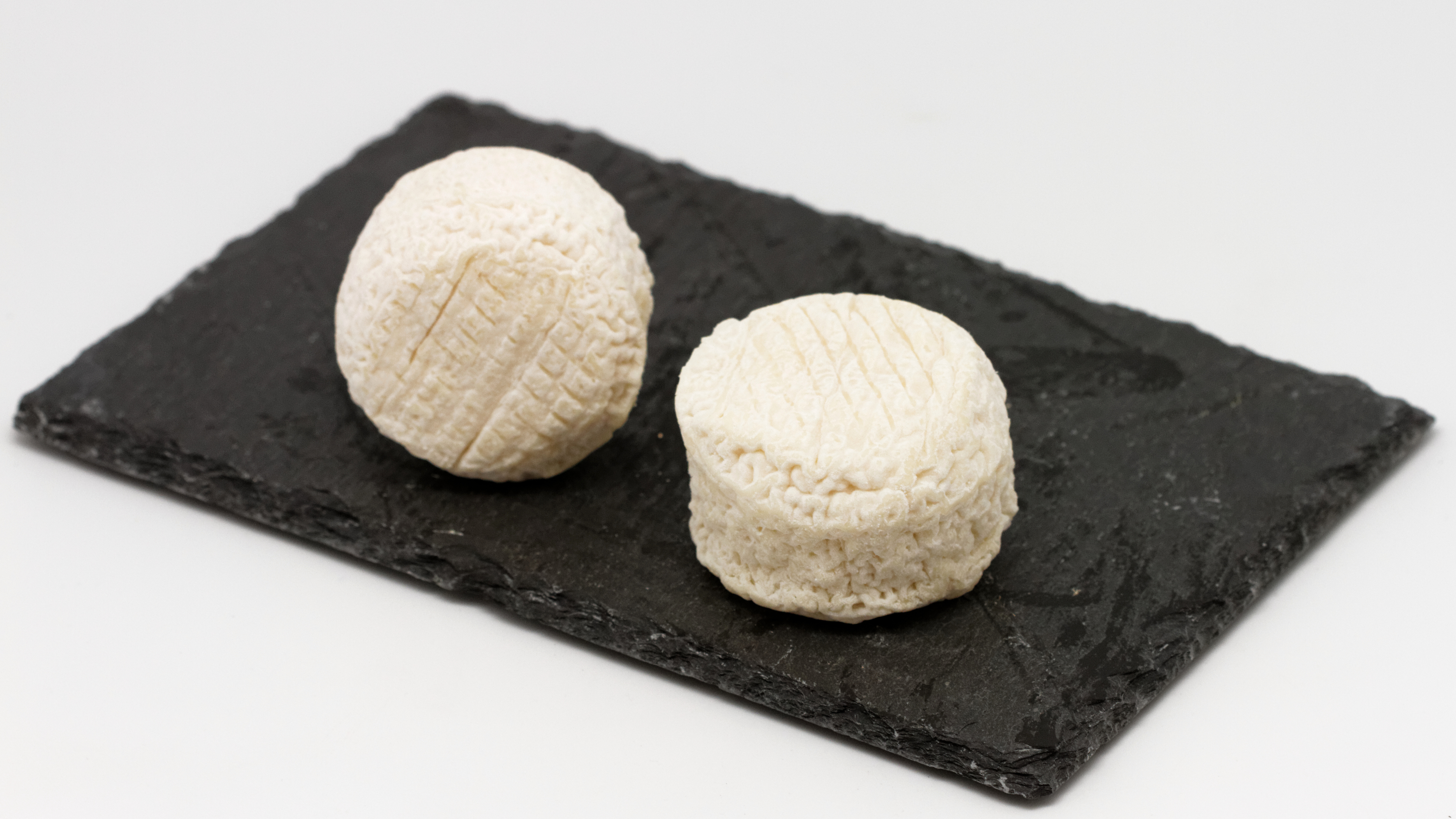
- Country of origin: France
- Region, town: Loire, Chavignol
- Source of milk: Goat
- Pasteurised: No
- Texture: Soft-ripened, crumbly
- Aging time: At least 4 weeks
- Certification: French AOC 1976
- Named after: Chavignol[*]

Crottin de Chavignol (French pronunciation: [kʁɔtɛ̃ d(ə) ʃaviɲɔl]) is a goat cheese produced in the Loire Valley. This cheese is the claim to fame for the village of Chavignol, France, which has only two hundred inhabitants.

== History ==
The small cylindrical goat cheese from the area around Chavignol has been produced since the 16th century, but the earliest extant written record dates from 1829 when its name and brief details of the cheese were recorded by a tax inspector.

The etymology is dubious: the word crot described a small oil lamp made from burned clay, which resembles the mould used to prepare the cheese. Another explanation is that old Crottin gets harder and browner and tends to look like dung, the French word for an animal dropping being crotte.

== Quality control ==
Protected by the AOC Seal, Crottin de Chavignol is produced today with traditional methods. If a cheese is labelled "Crottin de Chavignol", it has to be from the area around Chavignol, and it has to meet the stringent AOC production criteria.

== Flavour and age ==
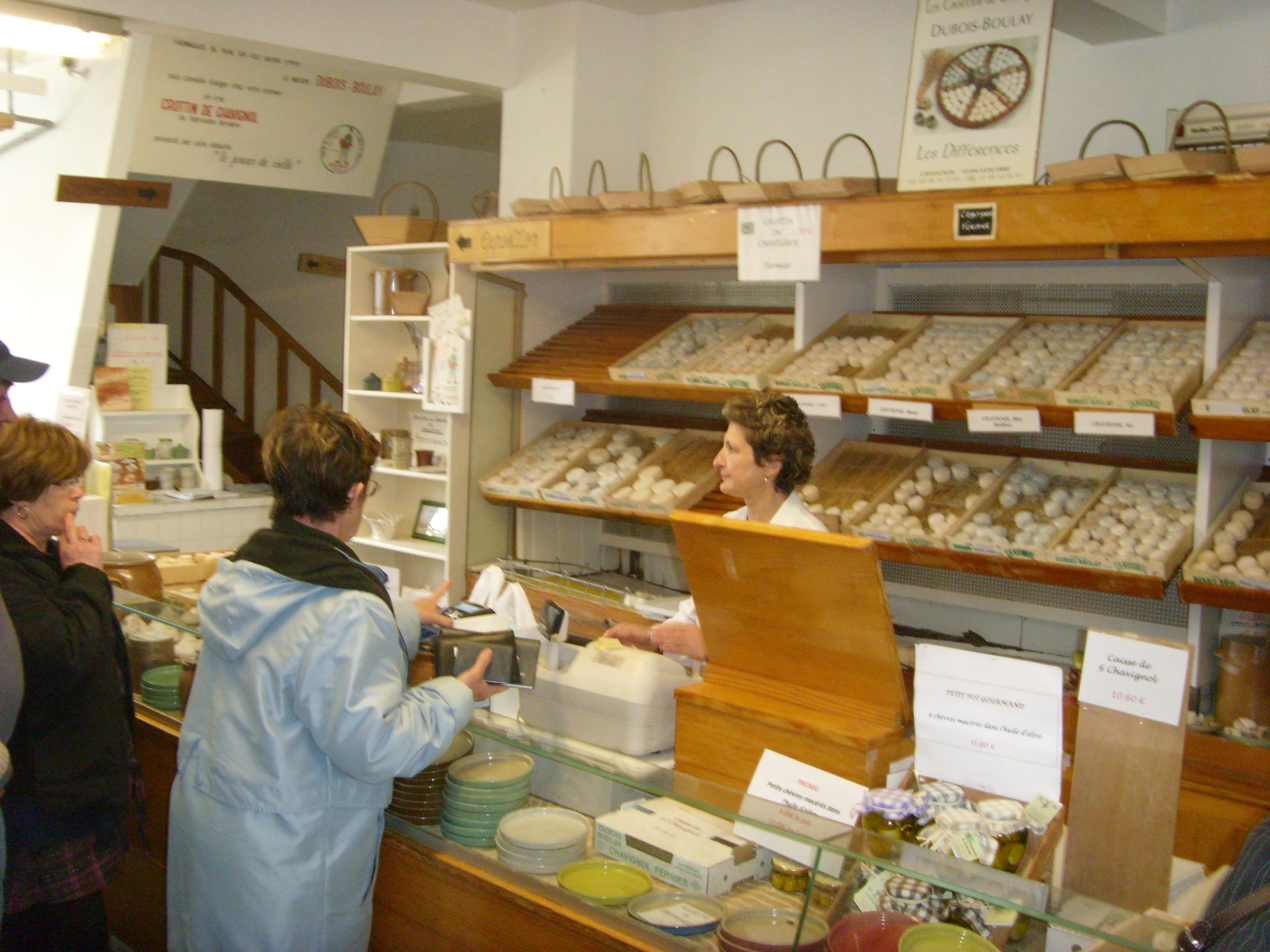
Retail shop of one of Chavignol's two cheese makers

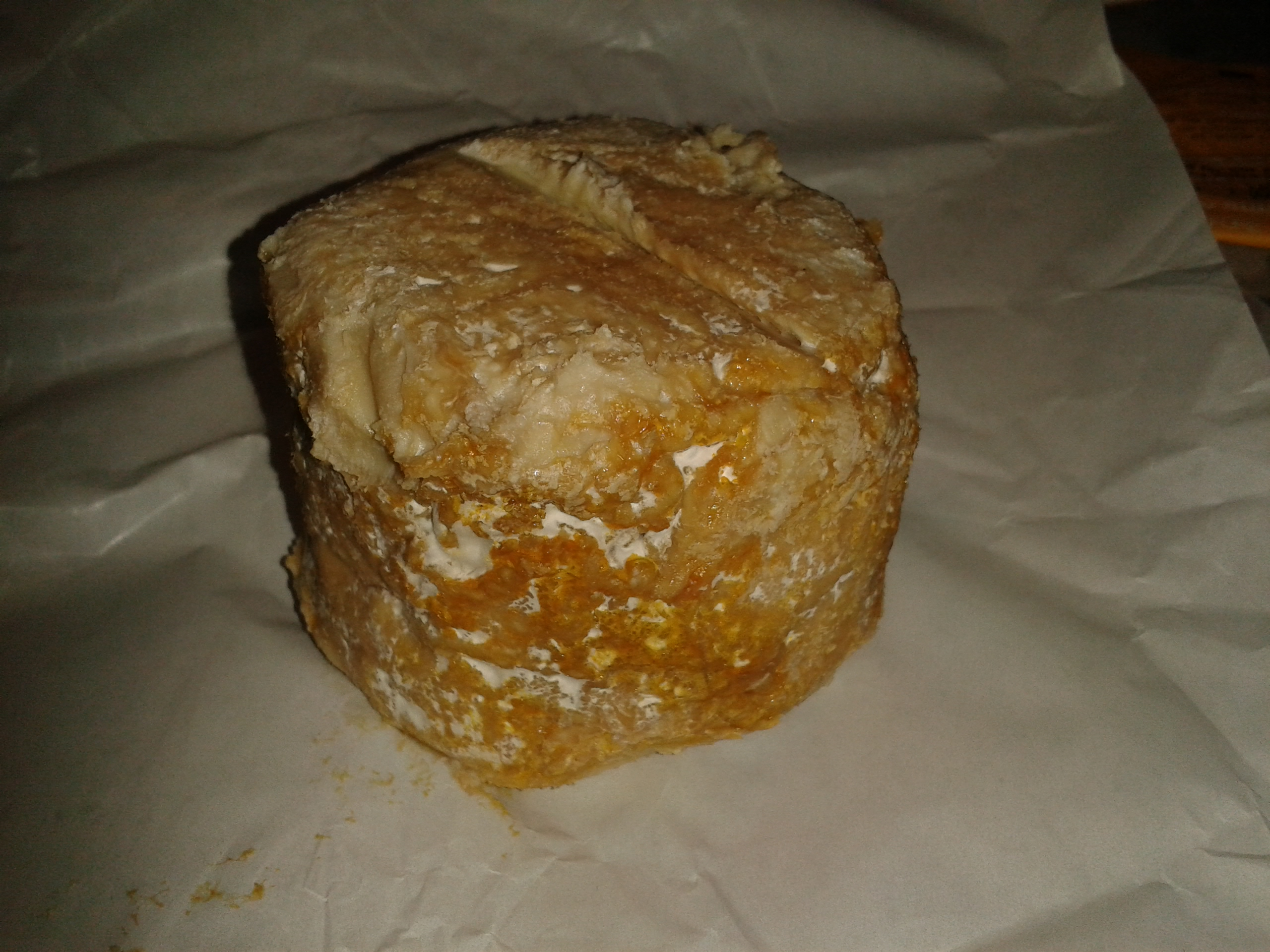
As it ripens (Chavignol bleuté), it takes on a stronger flavour and develops a harder rind.

Crottin de Chavignol is subtle and slightly nutty. In its youth (Chavignol jeune), its dough is solid and compact, and its rind is white. As it ripens (Chavignol bleuté), it takes on a stronger flavour and develops a harder rind. With full maturity (Chavignol affiné), the dough becomes crumbly and the mould on the rind matures into a bluish colour. The cheese is marketed and eaten at all three stages of maturity.

== Recipes ==
A classic dish is baked Crottin de Chavignol on a green salad. The dish is said to go well with a Sancerre wine from its home region. Although commonly served as a baked starter, Chavignol is also often found cold as a component element of a cheese board selection.

== See also ==
- List of goat milk cheeses
