= Stracchino =

Italian cheese

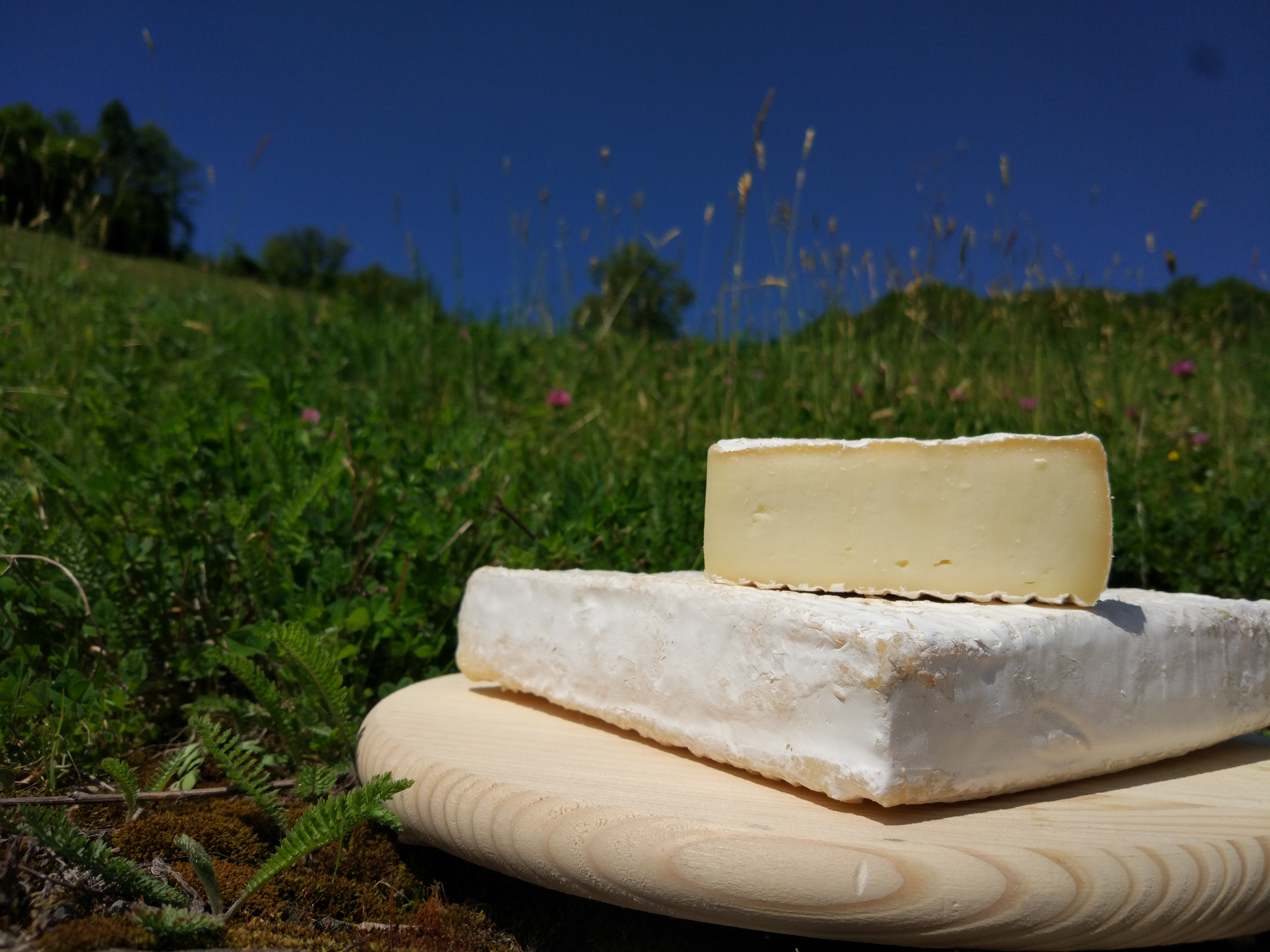
Stracchino

Stracchino (Italian: [strakˈkiːno]), also known as crescenza (Italian: [kreʃˈʃɛntsa]), is an Italian cow's milk cheese typical of the regions of Lombardy, Tuscany, Veneto, Friuli-Venezia Giulia, and Liguria. It is eaten very young, has no rind and has a very soft, creamy texture and normally a mild, slightly acidic flavour. It is normally square in shape.

== See also ==
- List of Italian cheeses
