= Trento–Venice railway =

Railway in Northern Italy

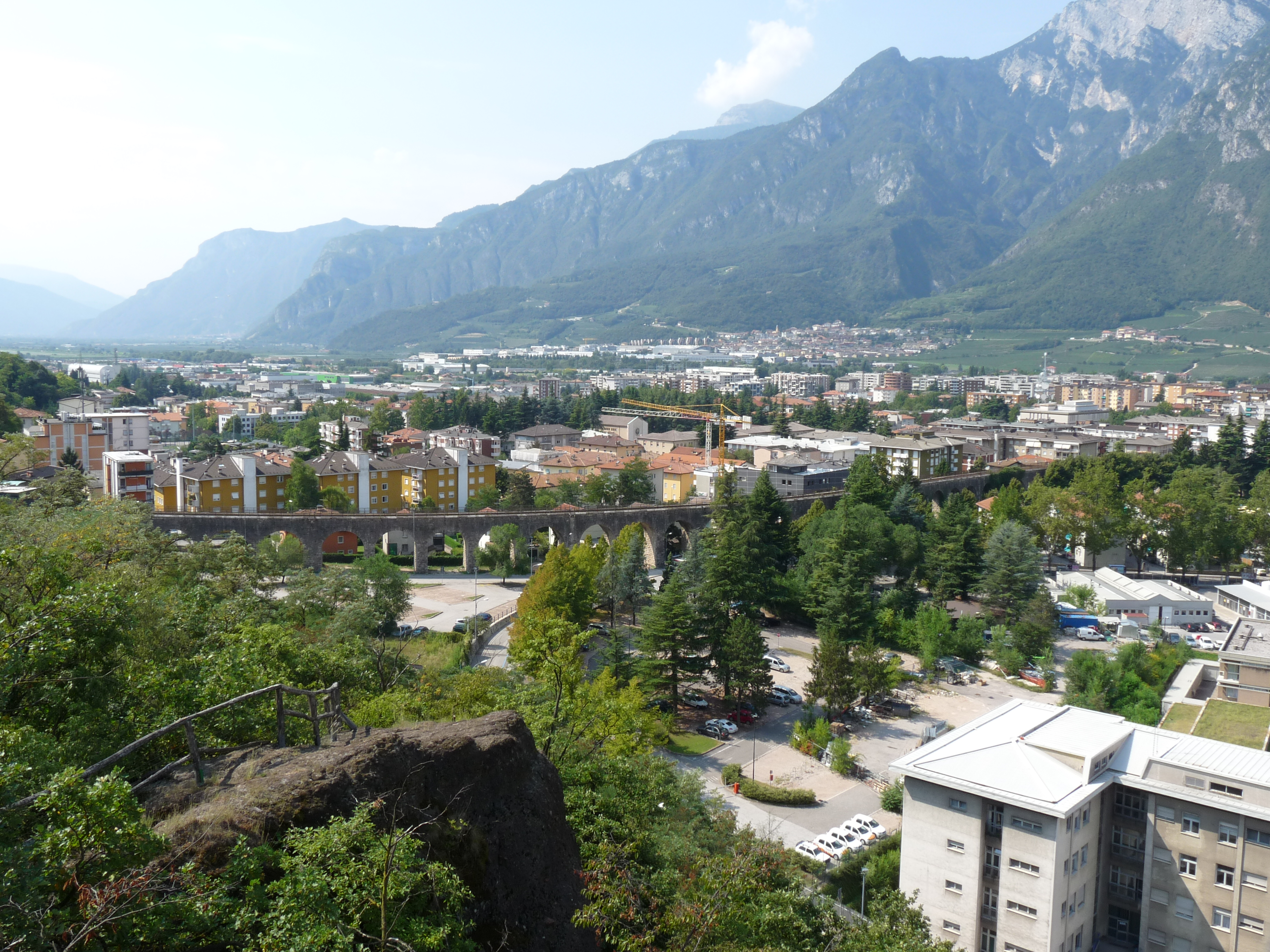
- Viaduct of the railway in Trento.

Overview
- Other name: Valsugana railway
- Status: Active
- Owner: RFI, kkStB (historic)
- Locale: Italy
- Termini: Trento; Venice Mestre
- Stations: 36

Service
- Type: Light rail, light metro
- Operator(s): Trenitalia, Trentino Trasporti

History
- Work began: 1896
- Opened: 1910

Technical
- Line length: 157 km (98 mi)
- Num of tracks: single track
- Track gauge: 1,435 mm (4 ft 8 1/2 in) standard gauge
- Electrification: 3000 V DC (Bassano del Grappa-Mestre)
- Operating speed: 55–140 km/h (34–87 mph)
- Signalling: SCMT
- Train protection system: SSC
- Highest elevation: 474 m (1,555 ft)

The Trento–Venice railway is an Italian state-owned railway line connecting Trento, in Trentino-Alto Adige, to Mestre, a suburb of Venice, in the Veneto region. At Mestre, it connects to the main line from Verona.

The line is managed by RFI, a company of the Ferrovie dello Stato group. Passenger traffic is run by Trenitalia, which also runs regional trains ordered by the Veneto region; in the province of Trento, Trentino Trasporti fulfills this role (line 401).

== History ==
Railway lines had been built from Trento, in what was then part of Austria-Hungary, in 1859 southwards to Verona, and in 1867 northwards to Bolzano and the Brenner Pass; today these form the Brenner Railway, the main railway connection between Italy and Austria. On the Italian side a line was built from Bassano del Grappa to Padua in 1877, and an extension to the Italian-Austrian border at Primolano was studied. However, when the Veneto joined the Kingdom of Italy, a new border was established at Tezze di Grigno, and hence the Austrians constructed a railway from Trento to Tezze in 1896, where it joined the Italian Valsugana railway line.

On the Italian side, the line from Mestre via Primolano to the border was built between 1906 and 1910, with the first part, to Bassano del Grappa, opening in 1908, and a second to Carpanè Valstagna the following year. Primolano now became an international border station, though only for a few years, as Trentino-Alto Adige became part of Italy after the First World War.

The line was electrified in the 1980s from Castelfranco Veneto to Venezia Mestre, and in 2003 from Castelfranco Veneto to Bassano del Grappa. Other improvements in the 2000s included a so-called 'light surface metro' - a half-hourly local train service which also services a series of new suburban stations in the Trento region. For this service, new trains of the Minuetto type were bought by Trentino Trasporti in order to replace the old FS Class ALn 668. A similar suburban service might be installed between Mestre and Castelfranco Veneto, but track improvements necessary for such a service are rendered difficult by the Padua-Venice section of the Verona–Venice high-speed railway.

== Characteristics ==
The 157-kilometre-long (98 mi) railway line is single track all the way from Trento to Maerne di Martellago, near Mestre, where it becomes double track for the last 10 km. All of it is standard gauge, and the line is electrified at 3000 V from Mestre to Bassano del Grappa, where the maximum speed is 120–140 km/h (75–87 mph). Beyond Bassano, maximum speeds are much lower, with an average grade of 10 per thousand, increasing to 22 per thousand beyond Primolano; the steepest section is between Trento and Villazzano which is also the slowest section with 55 km/h (34 mph). The section between Trento and Primolano will be also electrified at 3000 V to improve the light metro services in Trentino. Trains take about 3.5 hours to cover the complete distance, for an average speed of below 50 km/h.

== Services ==
Regional railway services are offered by Trenitalia and Trentino Trasporti from Trento to Bassano del Grappa (hourly), and from Bassano del Grappa to Venice Santa Lucia (hourly, since 2013). Additionally, hourly 'light surface metro' (metropolitana leggera di superficie) services are offered in peak hours between Borgo Valsugana East and Trento and between Castelfranco Veneto East and Venice.

== Gallery ==
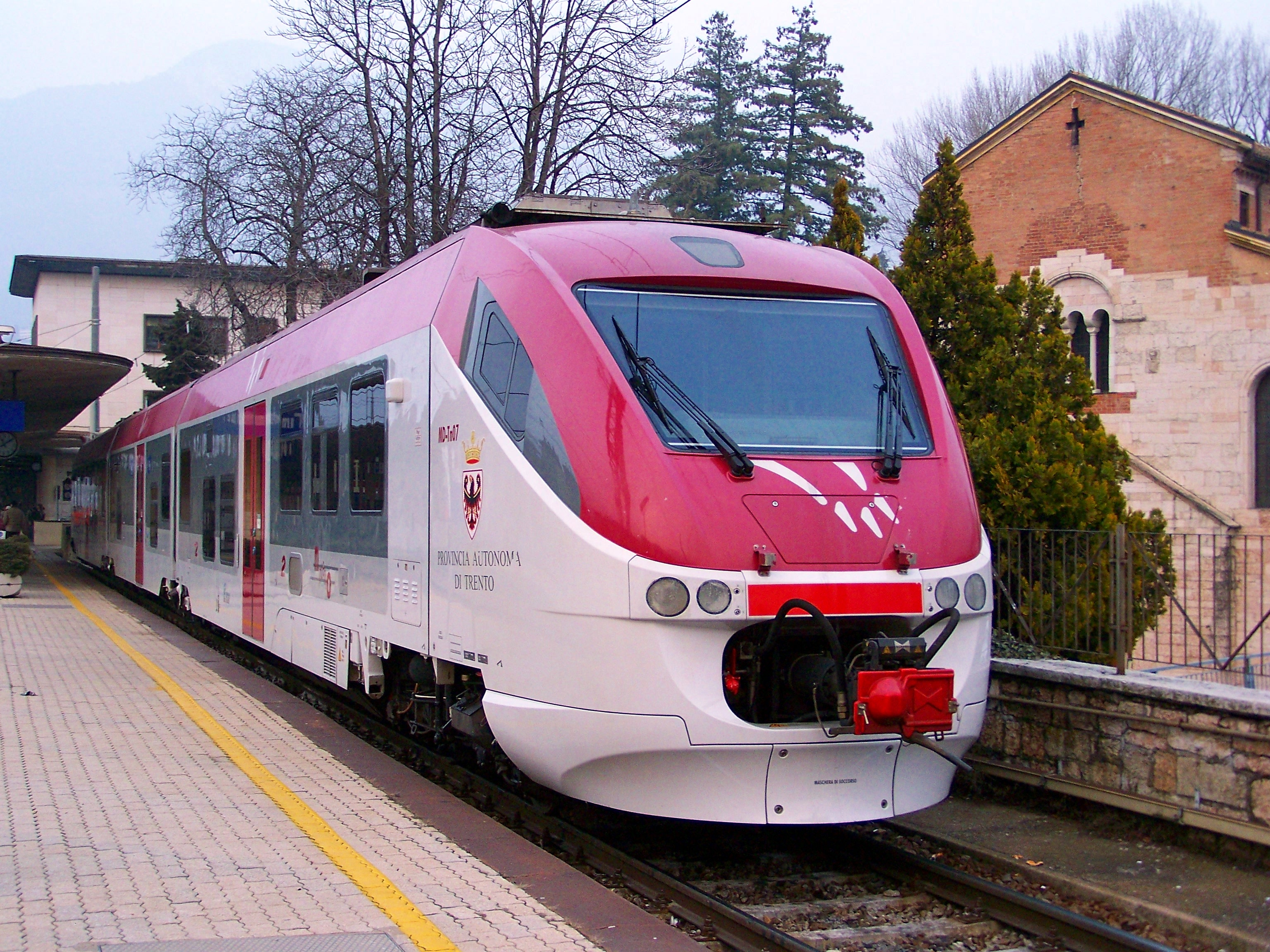
An Alstom Minuetto DMU at Trento railway station

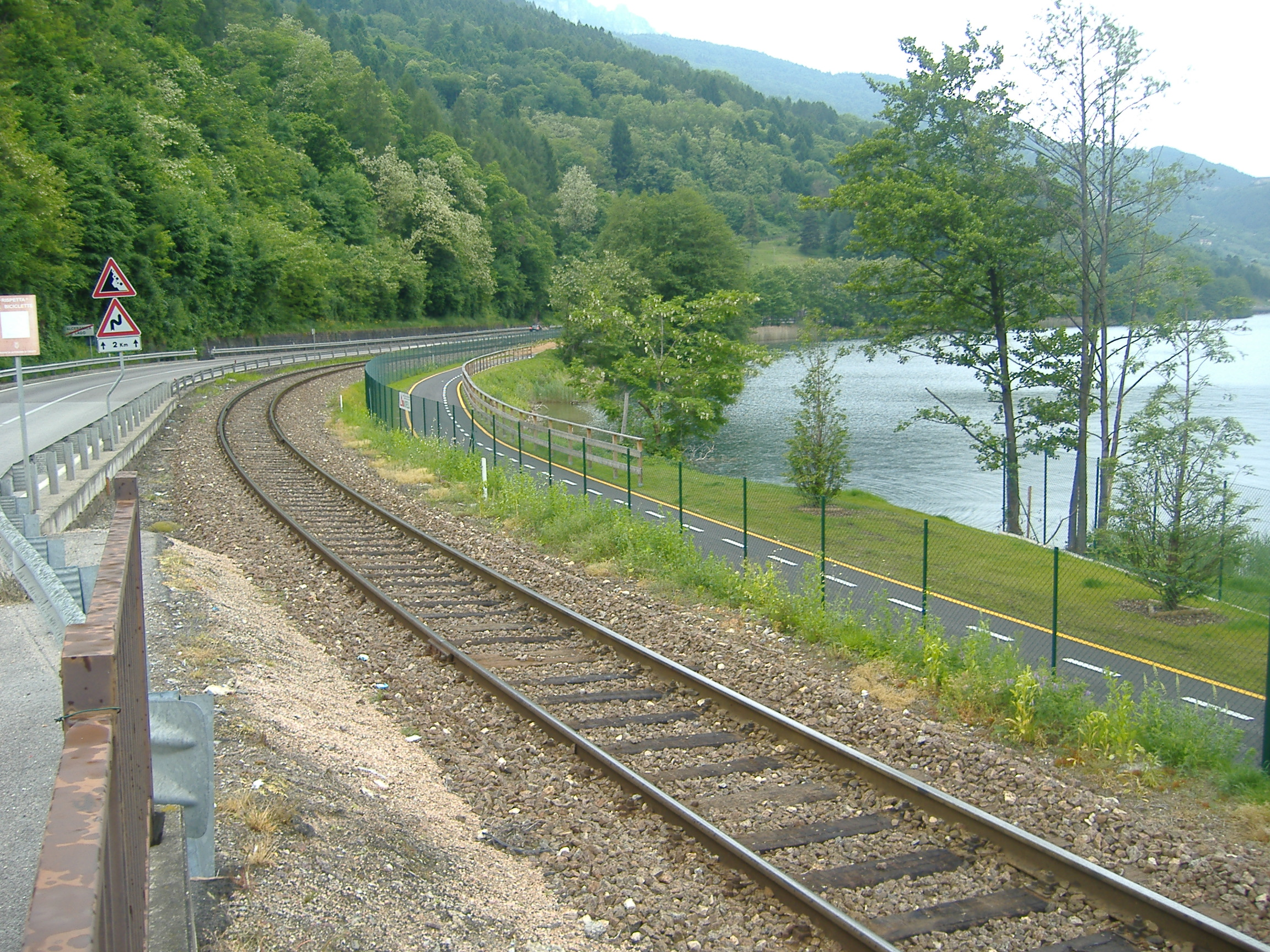
Railway at Calceranica al lago by the shore of Caldonazzo Lake

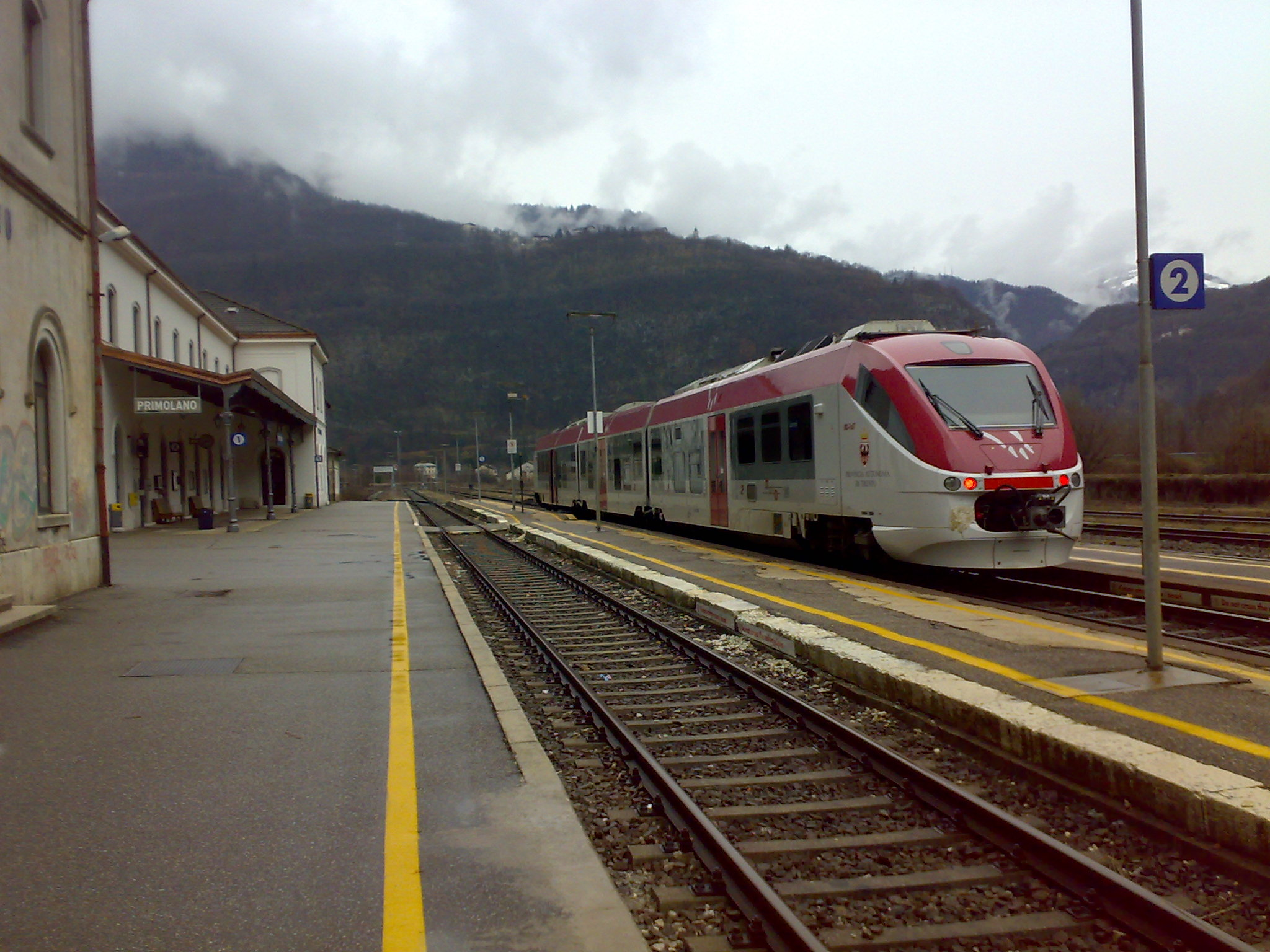
A train entering Primolano railway station

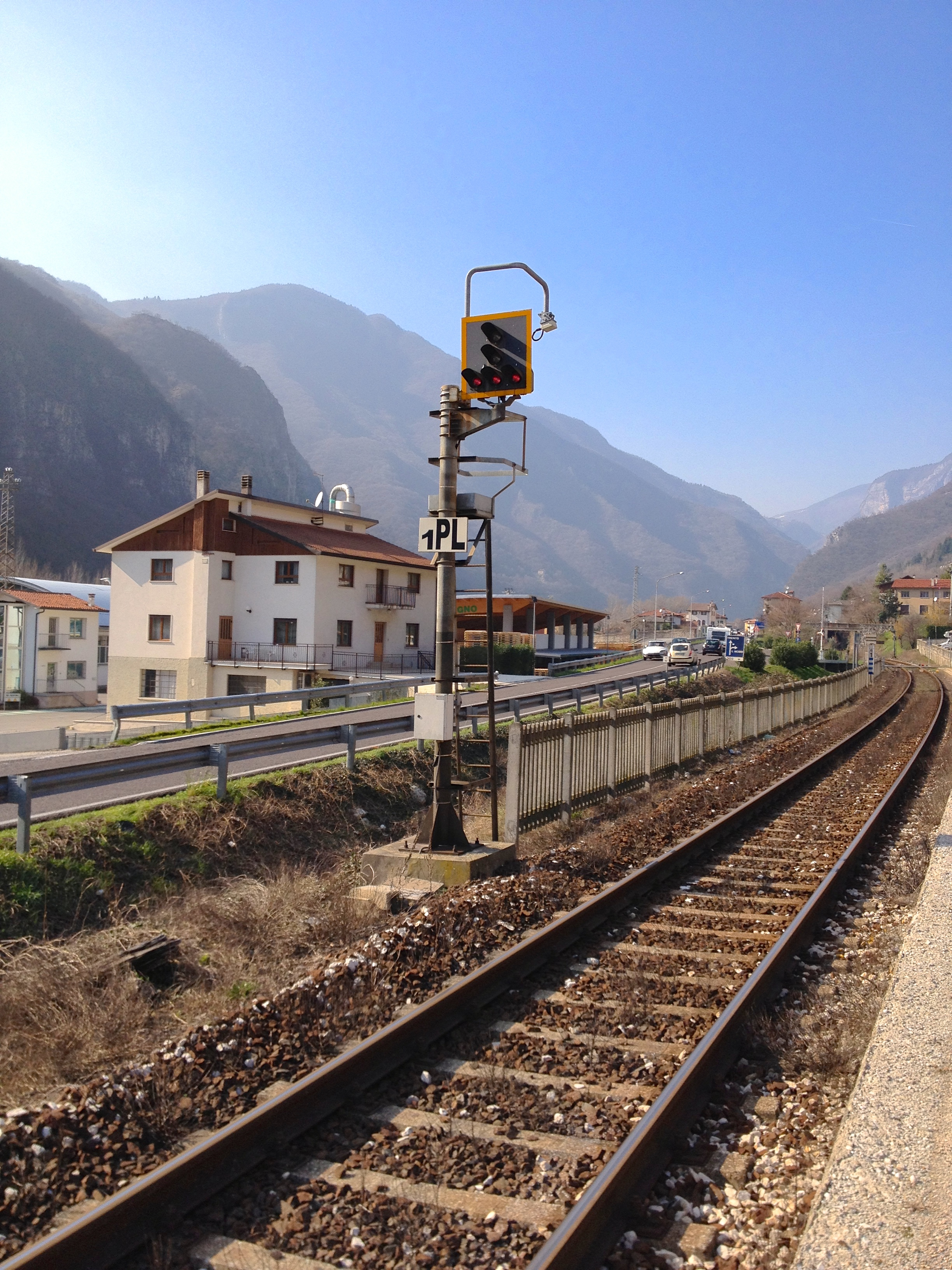
A SSC transponder on a wayside signal in Solagna

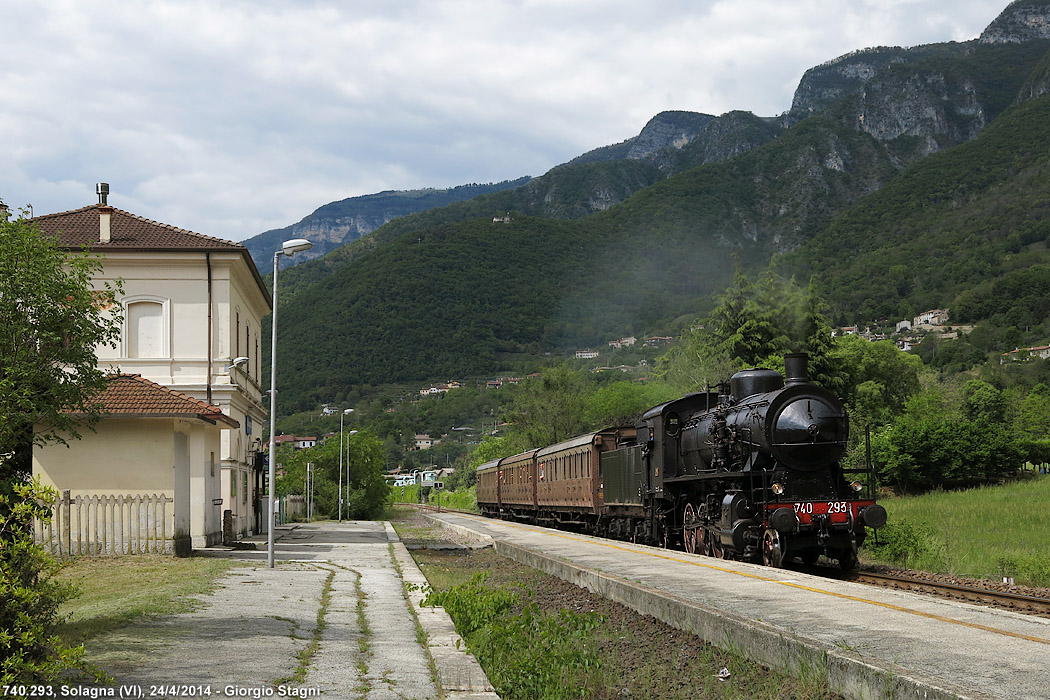
A restored FS Class 740 steam locomotive at Solagna

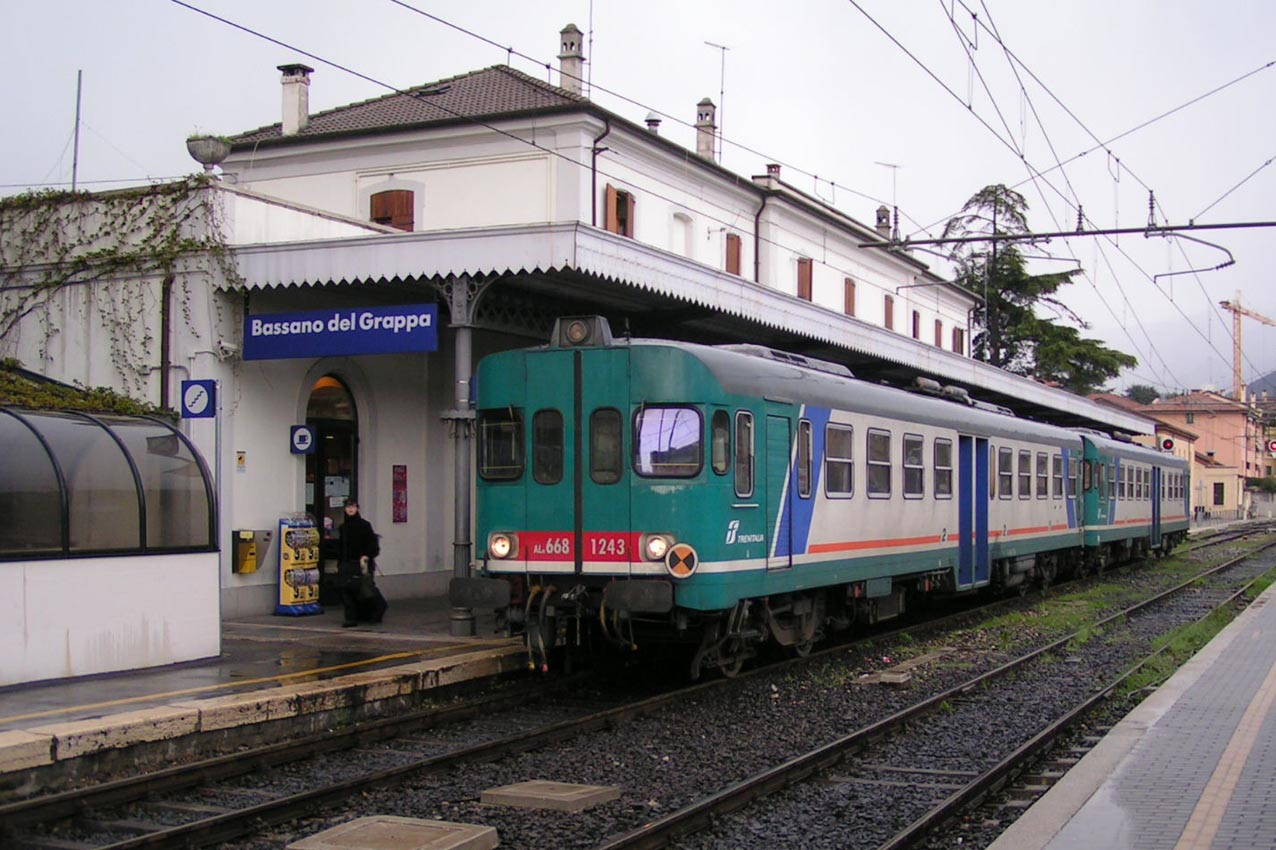
An ALn 668 railcar at Bassano del Grappa railway station

== See also ==
- List of railway lines in Italy
