= Nardini =

Nardini may refer to:

- Nardini (surname), an Italian surname
- Bartolo Nardini, Italian producer of alcoholic drinks
- Nardini (automobile), French automobile
- Nardini (grappa), Italian grappa
