= Valbrenta =

- Comune
- Comune di Valbrenta
- Location within Veneto Location within Italy
- Coordinates: 45°51′37″N 11°39′38″E
- Country: Italy
- Region: Veneto
- Province: Vicenza (VI)

Area
  - Total: 19.40 km^{2} (7.49 sq mi)
- Elevation: 160 m (520 ft)

Population (30 September 2019)
  - Total: 5,070
  - Density: 261/km^{2} (677/sq mi)
- Time zone: UTC+1 (CET)
  - Summer (DST): UTC+2 (CEST)
- Postal code: 36029
- Dialing code: 0424
- ISTAT code: 024125

Valbrenta is a comune in the province of Vicenza, Veneto region of Italy. It was formed on 30 January 2019 with the merger of the comunes of Campolongo sul Brenta, Cismon del Grappa, San Nazario and Valstagna.
