= Bassano del Grappa =

Bassano del Grappa Basan / Bassan (Venetian)
- Comune
- Città di Bassano del Grappa
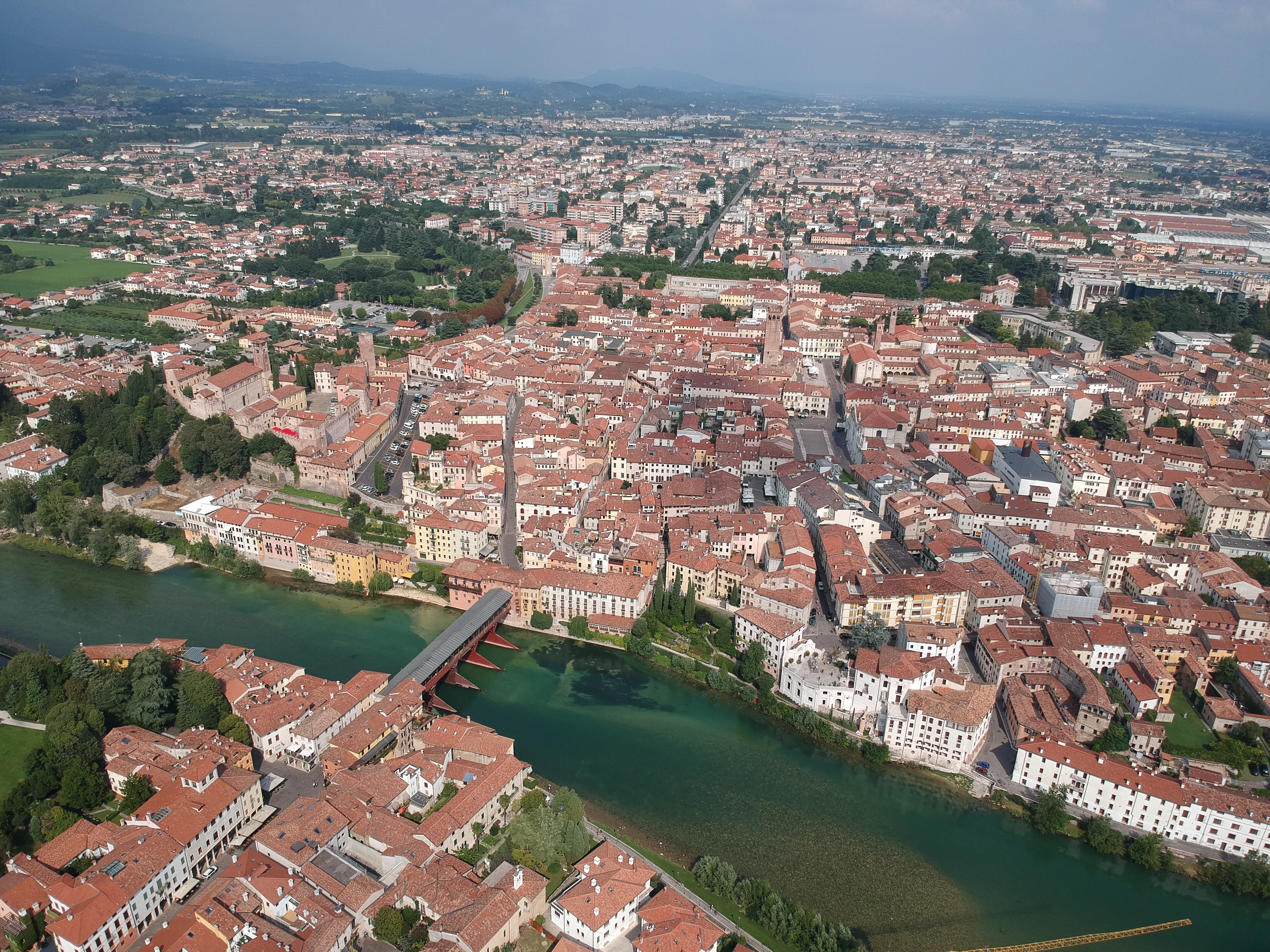
- Ponte Vecchio and Upper Castle.

- Coat of arms

- Location within Italy Location within Veneto
- Coordinates: 45°46′00″N 11°44′03″E
- Country: Italy
- Region: Veneto
- Province: Vicenza (VI)
- Frazioni: Rubbio. Contrade: Campese, Marchesane, San Michele, Sant'Eusebio, Valrovina

Government
  - Mayor: Nicola Ignazio Finco (Lega Nord)

Area
  - Total: 47 km^{2} (18 sq mi)
- Elevation: 129 m (423 ft)

Population (31 December 2022)
  - Total: 42,402
  - Density: 900/km^{2} (2,300/sq mi)
- Demonym: Bassanesi
- Time zone: UTC+1 (CET)
  - Summer (DST): UTC+2 (CEST)
- Postal code: 36061
- Dialing code: 0424
- ISTAT code: 024012
- Patron saint: St. Bassianus
- Saint day: 19 January
- Website: Official website

Bassano del Grappa (Venetian: Basan or Bassan, pronounced [baˈsaŋ]) is a city and comune, in the Vicenza province, in the region of Veneto, in northern Italy. It bounds the communes of Cassola, Marostica, Solagna, Pove del Grappa, Romano d'Ezzelino, Valbrenta, Lusiana Conco, Rosà, Cartigliano and Nove. Some neighbourhoods of these communes have become in practice a part of the urban area of Bassano, so that the population of the whole conurbation totals around 70,000 people.

The 16th-century painter Jacopo Bassano was born, worked, and died in Bassano, and took the town name as his own surname.

== History ==
=== Prehistoric and Roman periods ===
The city was founded in the 2nd century BC by a Roman called Bassianus, hence the name, as an agricultural estate. However, an ancient bronze sword (called "spada di Riccardo"), found in 2009 and dating back to the 7th century BC, suggests that the area of Bassano was already inhabited not just in the pre-Roman period, but possibly even in the pre-Venetic period, as confirmed by some artifacts found in a necropolis located in the neighbourhood of San Giorgio di Angarano.

=== From the Middle Ages to Venice ===
The first news of the existence of the medieval city dates from 998, while the castle is mentioned first in 1150. In 1175 Bassano was conquered by Vicenza, but the city maintained a semi-autonomous status as a free comune in the 13th century also, when it was home to the family of the Ezzelini, who first unified the various territories of Veneto.

In 1278, according to Giovanni da Nono, Matteo of the Cortusi family of Padua was elected podestà. In 1281, the city came under Paduan control. In 1368 Bassano was acquired by the Visconti of Milan and was given the status of "separate land" (terra separata).

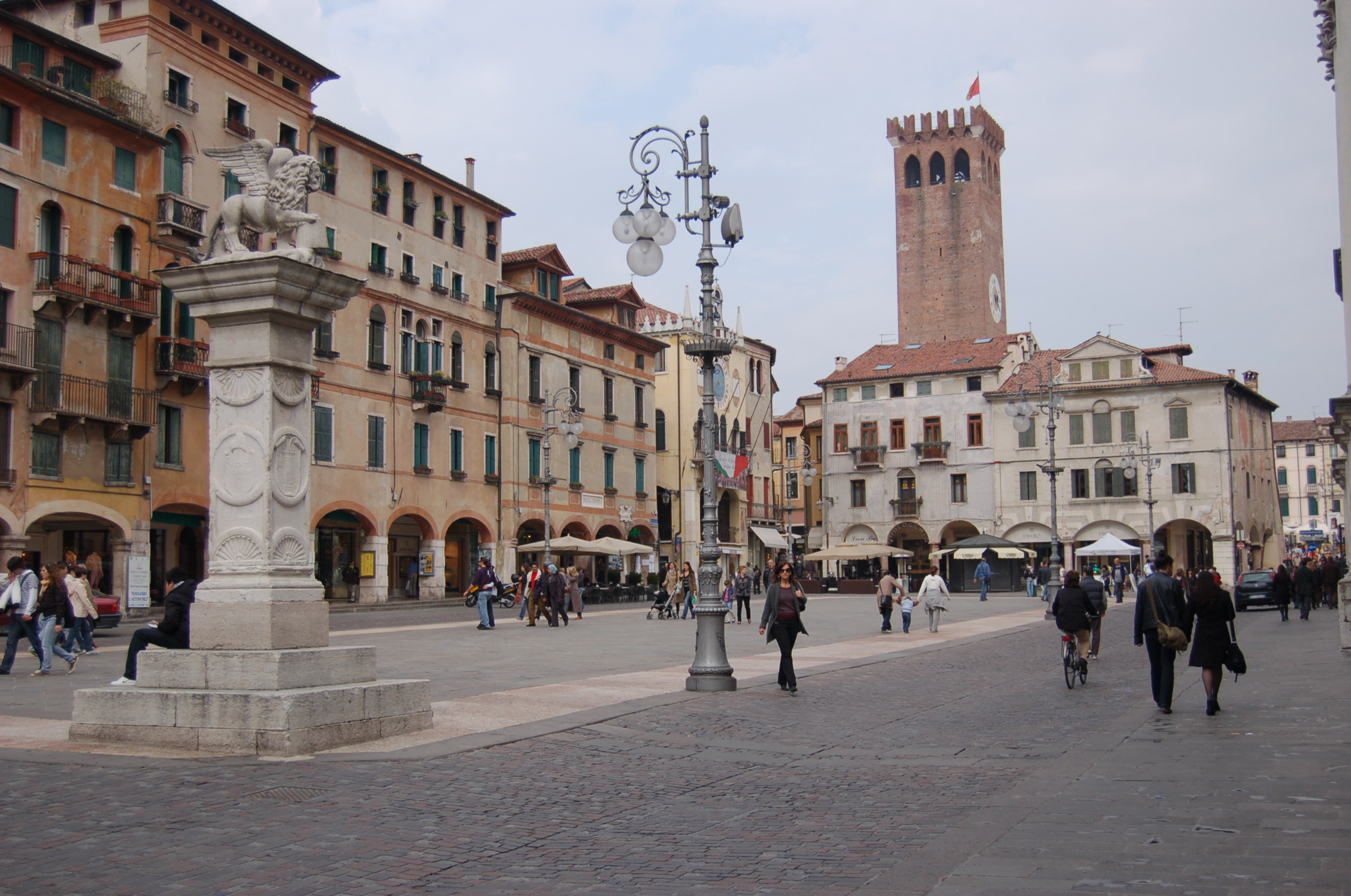
Piazza Libertà with the Lion of Saint Mark.

In 1404, Bassano became a part of the Stato da Tera 'Mainland State' of the Venetian Republic, which granted the Bassanese district the status of autonomous podesteria, "free and separate from whatever city and from the jurisdiction of whatever city" (sit ipsa terra exempta et separata a quacumque civitate et iurisdictione cuiuscumque civitatis) and subordinate only to Venice. The autonomous district included Bassano properly and the villas of Cartigliano, Cismon and Primolano, Rossano, San Nazario, Pove, Solagna plus Cassola (on lands previously belonging to Pove and Solagna) and Tezze and Rosà (on lands previously part of Bassano). In addition to this, Valstagna and Campese (then belonging to Vicenza and the Seven Communes) and Romano and Mussolente (then belonging to Treviso) had strong commercial and political ties with the district as they were located very close to Bassano and its port on the river Brenta connected with Venice. In 1760 Doge Francesco Loredan granted Bassano the title of City, subsequently retained under the Austrian and the Italian States. The Serenissima did not alter the town's magistratures, limiting itself to impose a Captain chosen by the Venetian Senate. The city became home to a flourishing industry producing wool, silk, iron and copper, and mainly for ceramics; in the 18th became especially famous in all Europe for the presence of the Remondini printer company.

=== From the fall of Venice to modern times ===
During the French Revolutionary Wars the city was the site of the Battle of Bassano. Napoleon Bonaparte remained in Bassano del Grappa for many months. In 1815 it was included in the Kingdom of Lombardy–Venetia, and became part of the unified Kingdom of Italy in 1866.

Until 1928 the name of the town was Bassano Veneto. After battles to gain control over the Mount Grappa massif during World War I, with significant Italian losses, a decision was made by the Mussolini-led government to change the name of the town (being in the foothills of said massif) to memorialise the loss of life. Thus, in 1928, the name was changed to Bassano del Grappa.

Ernest Hemingway, during his days as wartime ambulance driver, spent many days in Bassano, the environs of which are described in A Farewell to Arms' descriptions of the Italian frontline on the Venetian Plain. Other American writers spent some time in Bassano during World War I, such as F.Scott Fitzgerald and Dos Passos.

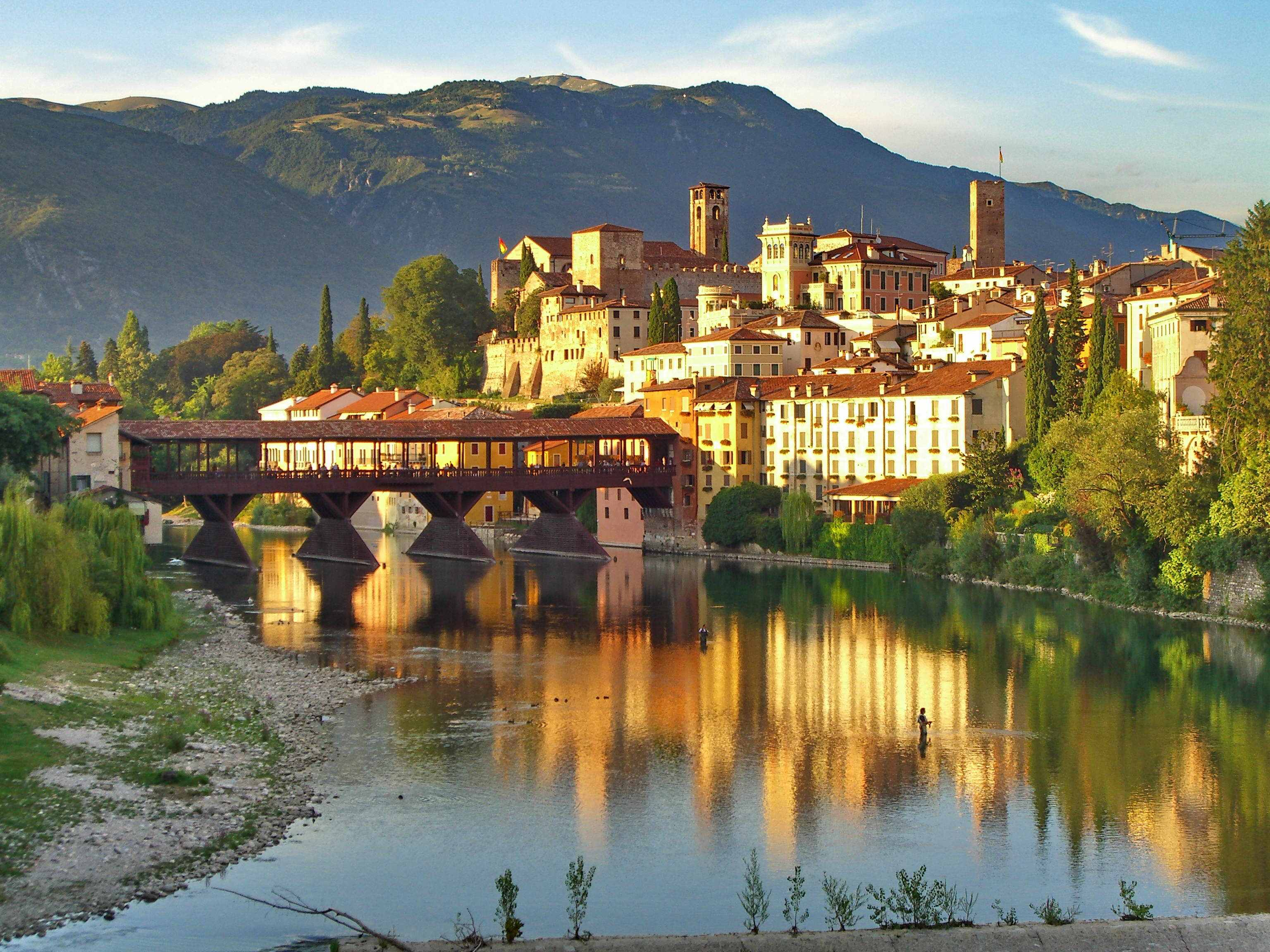
The Ponte Vecchio or Ponte degli Alpini.

During World War I Bassano was in the front area, and all industrial activities were halted.

In the last days of World War II, Bassano del Grappa was bombed by USAF B-24s and B-17s.

The symbol of the town is the covered Ponte Vecchio, which was designed by the architect Andrea Palladio in 1569. The wooden pontoon bridge was destroyed many times, the last time during World War II. The Alpine soldiers, Alpini, have always revered the wooden bridge and Bassano del Grappa. After the destruction of the bridge, they took up a private collection and had the bridge completely rebuilt. Soldiers often flock to the bridge to remember and sing songs from their days as alpine soldiers. The grappa shop of Nardini Distillery is located on the bridge, known as Ponte degli Alpini.

Bassano del Grappa is also the long residence town of Renzo Rosso, the founder and President of Diesel. Since Diesel began to expand in the mid-1980s, the company has become an important source of business for the city and its surrounding region. As thanks for the support that Rosso has received locally, he has invested personally in the city's professional soccer team, Bassano Virtus 55 S.T.

== Geography ==
Bassano is located at 129 m (423 ft) above sea level and has an area of 46.79 km^{2} (18.07 sq mi). Its highest point is at 1,421 m (4,662 ft), whereas the lowest point is at 84 m (276 ft). The city lies at the foothills of the Venetian Prealps, where river Brenta comes out the southern end of Canal di Brenta (also called Valbrenta 'Brenta valley') and flows in the lowlands at the borders of Vicenza, Treviso and Padua provinces.

== Main sights ==
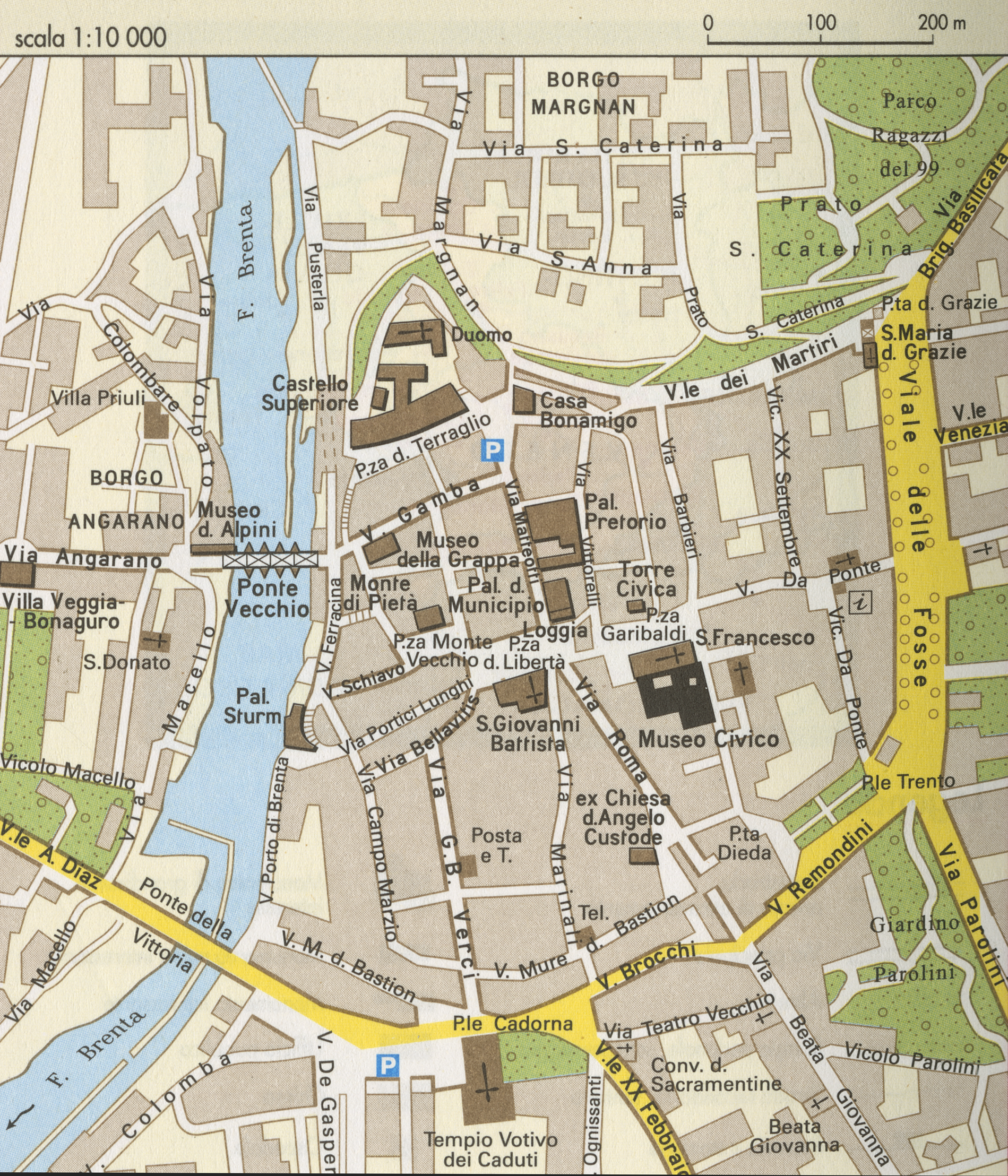
Plan of the historic center

- The cathedral (Duomo), built around the year 1000 but renovated in 1417. It has works by Leandro da Bassano, Ottavio Marinali and others
- The Castello Superiore (Upper Castle)
- The church of St. John the Baptist, built in the 14th century and restored in the 18th century.
- San Francesco: with a Crucifix by Guariento (14th century) and remains of contemporary frescoes. Next to the church is the Town Museum, with ancient archaeological remains, works by Antonio Canova and the Tiepolos, and drawings by Gian Lorenzo Bernini, Spagnoletto, Albrecht Dürer and Rembrandt
- The wooden covered bridge, built on the Brenta River, known as Ponte Vecchio or Ponte degli Alpini, was designed in 1569 by the architect Andrea Palladio to replace a pre-existing construction existing from at least 1209. The bridge was destroyed by a flood in 1748, and was rebuilt three years later. The Nardini tavern on the bridge is unchanged since 1779.
- Palazzo Michieli-Bonato, with a façade frescoed by Jacopo da Bassano.
- The Palazzo del Municipio (Town Hall), erected from 1404. It has a Renaissance-style loggia and a fresco attributed to Jacopo da Bassano.
- The Monte di Pietà, a Renaissance edifice with 15th-century coats of arms.
- The Palazzo Sturm, home to the Ceramics Museum
- The Torre Civica (Civic Tower, 14th Century) 43 metres, in Piazza Garibaldi.

In the neighbourhood are the Villa Rezzonico, designed by Baldassarre Longhena, Art Nouveau's Villa Agnesina, designed by Francesco Bonfanti in 1923, and the 17th century Villa Bianchi-Michiel, with a garden decorated by statues.

== Administrative subdivisions ==
The municipal statute (art.6, par.2) of Bassano, recognizes only Rubbio as frazione and defines Campese, Marchesane, San Michele, Sant'Eusebio and Valrovina as contrade. The other existing neighbourhoods of Bassano are not mentioned in the statute. However, in practice, all the administrative subdivisions have the same prerogatives and are named quartieri.

=== Frazioni ===
Rubbio is a frazione and quartiere located at an altitude of 1,057 m (3,468 ft) on the Asiago plateau. This hamlet is contiguous with another hamlet, also named Rubbio, which is part of the commune of Lusiana Conco. Thus, in practice, the two hamlets form one village (named Rubbio), even though they belong to two different communes from the administrative point of view.

=== Contrade ===
Officially, the contrade (in ven. contrae) are Campese, Marchesane, San Michele, Sant'Eusebio and Valrovina. From an administrative point of view these are also quartieri. However, in practice, some of these neighbourhoods themselves contain smaller inhabited areas (as streets, groups of houses) also called contrade: there are thus contrade within contrade. Besides, some places known as contrade exist also within other neighbourhoods which are officially simply defined as quartieri, but not contrade.

=== Quartieri ===
All the administrative subdivisions (quartieri) of Bassano del Grappa are: Centro Storico, Margnan, San Marco, San Vito, Ca' Baroncello, Firenze, San Bassiano, San Lazzaro, San Fortunato, Borgo Zucco, Marchesane, Rondò Brenta, Angarano, XXV Aprile, Sant'Eusebio, San Michele, Valrovina, Rubbio, Campese, Merlo, Pré, Santa Croce.

Rubbio, with an area of 6.833 km^{2}, is the largest quartiere of Bassano del Grappa, but also the least populated (65 inhabitants in 2023).

Quartiere Prè (an old venetian plural meaning meadows, the modern ven. plural is prai), located in the southern lowland of Bassano del Grappa, is the second least populated quartiere (248 inhabitants in 2023). Part of it hosts an industrial zone that also falls in the nearby San Lazzaro, but it also contains a considerable rural area which falls within the Parco rurale sovracomunale Civiltà delle Rogge regional park.

San Vito, in the north-eastern part of Bassano del Grappa, is the most populated quartiere (6278 inhabitants in year 2023). It merges with the built-up areas of the bordering comunes Romano d'Ezzelino, Cassola and Pove del Grappa.

=== Territorial variations ===
Until 1928, the official name of Bassano del Grappa was simply Bassano (as it is still informally called today). In 1878, the neighbourhood of Campese, previously belonging to the commune of Campolongo sul Brenta, was detached from Campolongo and aggregated to Bassano. In 1938, the commune of Valrovina, which also comprised Rubbio, was suppressed and aggregated to Bassano.

== People ==
- Luigi Agnolin, football referee
- Jacopo Bassano, painter
- Jeronimo Bassano, Master of Trumpets and Shawms to the Doge in Venice
- Giovanni Battista Brocchi, geologist
- Giusto Bellavitis, mathematician and senator
- Miki Biasion, World Rally Champion
- Luisa Vania Campagnolo, luthier
- Simone Cogo (Sir Bob Cornelius Rifo), Musician and founder of The Bloody Beetroots
- Luigi Fabris, sculptor and ceramist, founder of Manifattura Italiana Porcellane Artistiche Fabris
- Pietro Fabris, senator
- Tommaso Gabrielli, motorcycle racer
- Antonio Gaidon, architect, civil engineer, naturalist
- Tito Gobbi, opera singer
- Federico Marchetti, footballer
- Francesca Michielin, singer and songwriter
- Jacek Pałkiewicz, Polish journalist, traveler and explorer.
- Joseph Pivato, writer and academic in Canada, born in Tezze sul Brenta.
- Stefano Rusconi, professional basketball player, who also played in the NBA
- Renzo Rosso, Founder and President of Diesel (brand) and the Only The Brave Group
- Iacopo Vittorelli, poet
- Giovanni Volpato, engraver

== International relations ==
=== Twin towns – Sister cities ===
Bassano del Grappa is twinned with:

- Bellegra, Italy
- Lampedusa e Linosa, Italy
- Mühlacker, Germany
- Šibenik, Croatia
- Mostar, Bosnia and Herzegovina
- Voiron, France

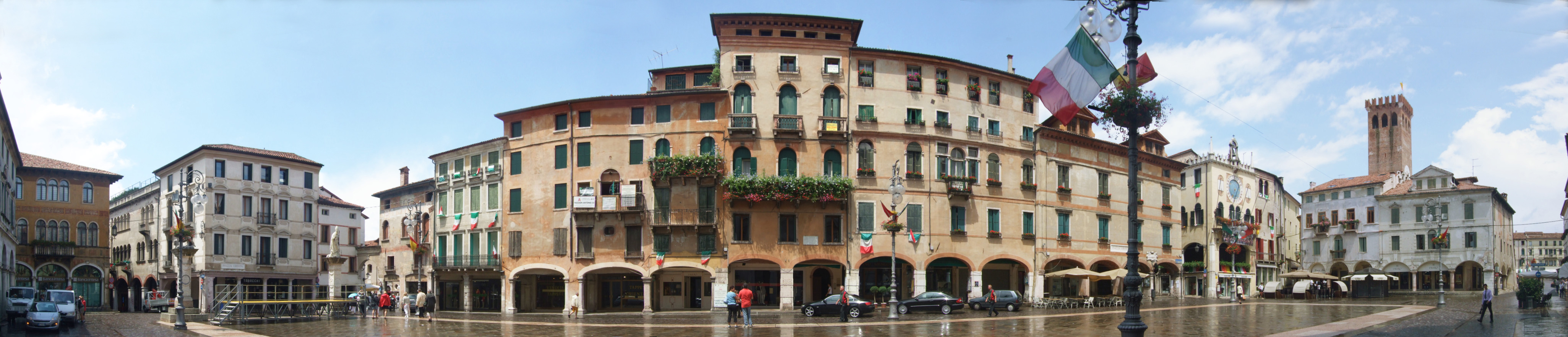
Piazza della Libertà.

== Main industries in the area ==
- Diesel (brand)
- Baxi
- Manfrotto
- Vimar
- ABB
- Montegrappa
- Poli Distillerie
