= Angarano =

Angarano may refer to:

- Michael Angarano (born 1987), American actor
- Villa Angarano, a villa in Bassano del Grappa, Veneto, northern Italy
