= Vendramini =

Vendramini is an Italian surname. It may refer to:

- Danny Vendramini, director of Redheads (1992 film)
- Elisabetta Vendramini (1790–1860), Italian nun
- Giovanni Vendramini (1769–1839), Italian engraver
- Luigi Vendramini (born 1996), Brazilian mixed martial artist

== See also ==
- Vendramin family
