= Antonio Gaidon =

Italian architect, urban planner and naturalist (1738 - 1829)

Antonio Gaidon (1738–1829), was an architect, urban planner and naturalist.

== Early life and training ==
Antonio Gaidon was born in Castione di Brentonico (Trentino) in 1738. His parents were Salvatore and Barbara Burma, residents of Bassano del Grappa.

His father came from a long line of stonemasons. As a boy, in order to follow his father's trade, Gaidon was placed in the workshop of Giovanni Bonato. He reluctantly applied himself to the trade of stonemason but preferred scientific subjects such as geometry and engineering. For example, he read the Elements of Euclid, and delighted in reproducing the simple machines built by Bartolomeo Ferracina, an hydraulic engineer from Bassano.

== Architecture ==
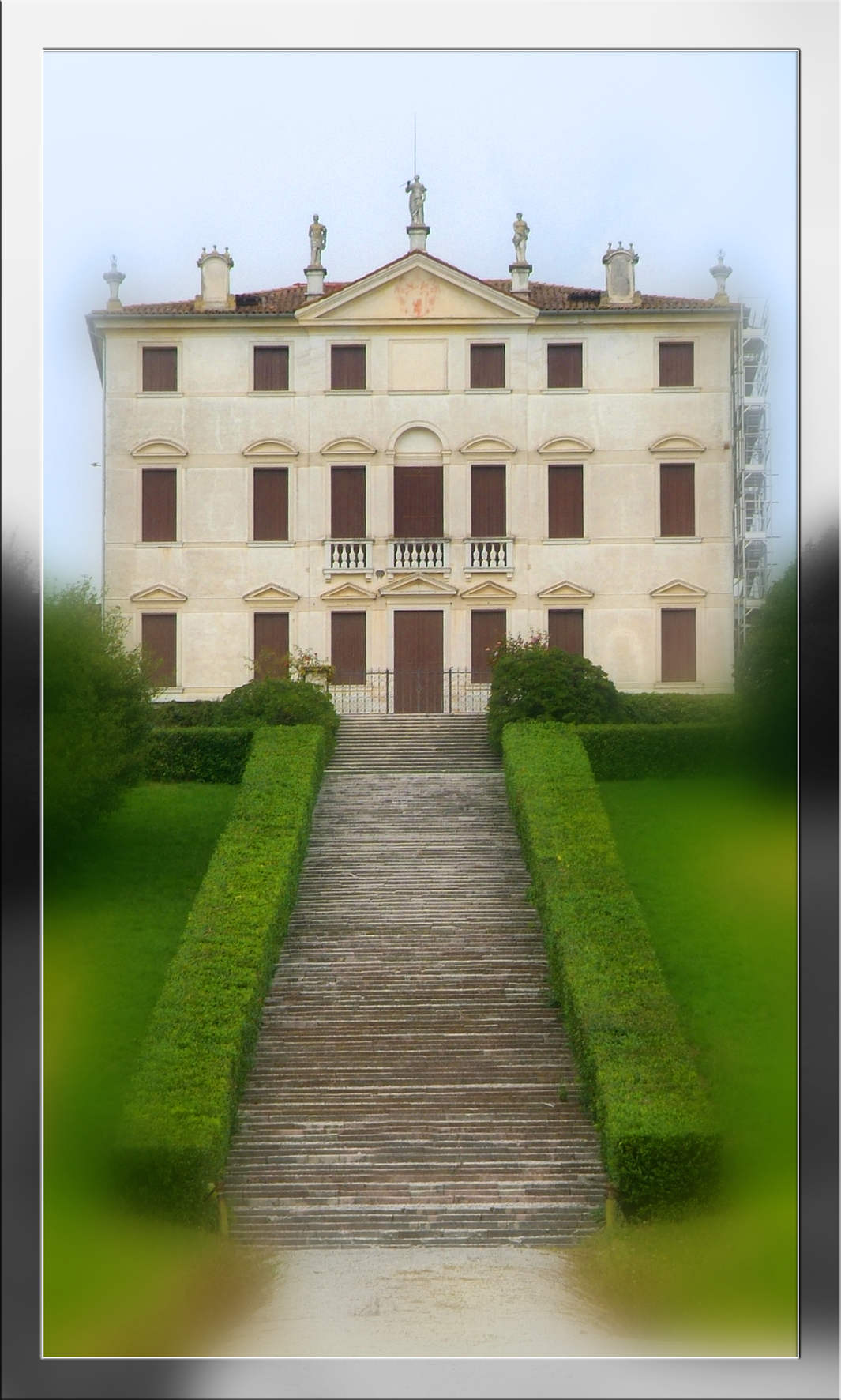
Villa Negri Piovene - panoramio - Gregorini Demetrio

He also showed an interest in architecture, reading, I Sette libri dell'architettura by Sebastiano Serlio, la Regola delli cinque ordini d'architettura of Vignola and I quattro libri dell'architettura by Andrea Palladio . His father introduced him to Daniello Bernardi who had studied architecture with Domenico Cerato and Francesco Maria Preti. With Bernardi, Gaidon achieved rapid progress. The association between the two continued for many years before breaking down in 1790, when Gaidon accused Bernardi of plagiarising his projects.

In 1763, the Bassanese nobleman Antonio Negri Miazzi, an amateur architect, commissioned Gaidon to build the Negri villa (now Piovene) in Mussolente. In the same period, Gaidon dedicated himself to the construction of the church of Mussolente (now the Sanctuary of the Madonna dell’Acqua) and, probably, of the villa Ghislanzoni Del Barco and Villa Dolfin Baldu. In 1768, he sent drawings for the Architecture Prize of the Academy of Parma. In 1769, he designed the Bonfadini Palace also known as the Gran Caffe Ausonia in the Piazza San Giovanni, in Bassano and in 1770, the Palazzo Scolari, now Marin, in Piazzetto dell’Angelo.

In 1772, he partially rebuilt the church in the grounds of the villa of Ca 'Cornaro. He also designed the churches at Borso del Grappa and Semonzo. In 1773, he began works for the church at Sant'Eulalia in the Treviso area (completed in 1794). Later he oversaw the construction of the church at Campolongo sul Brenta (built between 1793 and 1826). In 1800, he also designed and oversaw the completion of the barchesse at the Villa Rezzonico, built by Baldassare Longhena, in Bassano. The south barchessa served as guest quarters, while the north barchessa was used as a rustic outbuilding.

== Urban planning and engineering ==
Gaidon's endeavours were not limited to architecture alone. In 1769, he was appointed a land surveyor or "public appraiser", by the Council of the city of Bassano, a position he held for forty years. A manuscript by Gaidon dated 1788, entitled: Acque perenni e torrenti che mettono nel fiume Brenta, dalla sua origine fino alle Nove, villaggio vicentino (in English: Perennial waters and streams that flow into the Brenta river from its origins to Nove, a village in Vicenza), preserved in the Civic Library, Bassano, speaks extensively of the river Brenta, its springs and tributaries. He also wrote some expert reports for the restoration work on the arches of the Brenta bridge. In 1776 he redesigned the Piazza San Francesco (now Garibaldi), infilling the ‘fossa’ (In English:pit or pool) which had been in the centre of the square to be used in cases of fire in the town. In 1782, he was commissioned to design a monument in honour of the engineer and clockmaker Bartolomeo Ferracina. (Ferracina was particularly famous for the reconstruction of the clock on the tower in Piazza San Marco in Venice). Among his most important urban accomplishments in Bassano was the construction of the current Viale delle Fosse, a boulevard, which reclaimed the land along the eastern walls of the city. The boulevard, constructed between 1791 and 1794, comprised a large central avenue, flanked in turn by two pedestrian avenues, and was adorned with a double row of lime trees and numerous statues that, starting from the Porta delle Grazie, reached the Parolini Garden. This new road was called the "Passeggio pubblico di Belvedere o Fosse". (In English: "Belvedere or Fosse public walk".) In his later years, between 1810 and 1812, Gaidon oversaw the work on two roads which, starting from Bassano, headed eastwards towards the Piave river and are still today, with some modifications, the arteries of main traffic routes in the area. The first (the Strada del Molinetto) ran at the foot of the Grappa massif, the other (today Schiavonesca Marosticana) ran south of the hilly belt up to Asolo and then continued towards Maser, Veneto and Cornuda. The cost of the works was 22,838 Italian lire, to be distributed among the countryside they crossed.

== Naturalism ==
Alongside the activity of architect and urban planner, Gaidon did not forget the natural sciences. These studies were driven by the Venetian nobleman Iacopo Morosini and by the geologist and superintendent of agriculture of the Venetian state Giovanni Arduino, who asked Gaidon to accompany him on several excursions in the Vicenza area. Gaidon's geological observations and studies of the vegetation and flora around Bassano, made their way into the numerous letters that appeared between 1778 and 1784 in the Natural Science columns of the Nuovo Giornale d'Italia. Other articles were published on a variety of other topics, such as an article on the lead mine of Valsugana Lettera intorno una miniera di piombo della Valsugana, which was published in the Magazzino georgico di Napoli del 1786. (Naples Rural Magazine, 1786). These studies brought Gaidon into contact with the greatest geologists and naturalists of the time, such as Alberto Fortis, Deodat Gratet de Dolomieu and John Strange, as well as with the Bohemian paleontologist and botanist Count Kaspar Maria von Sternberg, who had him as a companion and guide, in the herbal studies carried out in August 1803 in the Bassano area. Sternberg dedicated his Catalogus plantarum to Gaidon.

Gaidon also trained some students who would later excel themselves, such as the architect, later copper engraver, Giovanni Vendramini, and especially the botanist Giambattista Brocchi, introduced by Gaidon to natural history and who remained very close to his master.

Antonio Gaidon's sons, Giuseppe and Pietro from his second marriage to Domenica Campesan in 1770, were also architects and, perhaps in an effort to further their careers, he favoured the confusion between his drawings and those of his sons, as in the case of the project for the church of Blessed Giovanna (or S. Maria della Misericordia; 1812) in Bassano.

== Final years ==
In 1817, he was still a civil engineer. An accidental fall in 1823 forced him to slow down his activities and he spent his last years with his children in Vicenza. Antonio Gaidon died on November 22, 1829, in his home at number 453, calesello Terraglia, Bassano del Grappa. The death register at S. Maria del Colle, lists his profession as engineer. He was interred at the cemetery of Santa Croce.
