= Calà del Sasso =

Staircase in Italy

Coordinates: 45°51′49″N 11°37′49″E

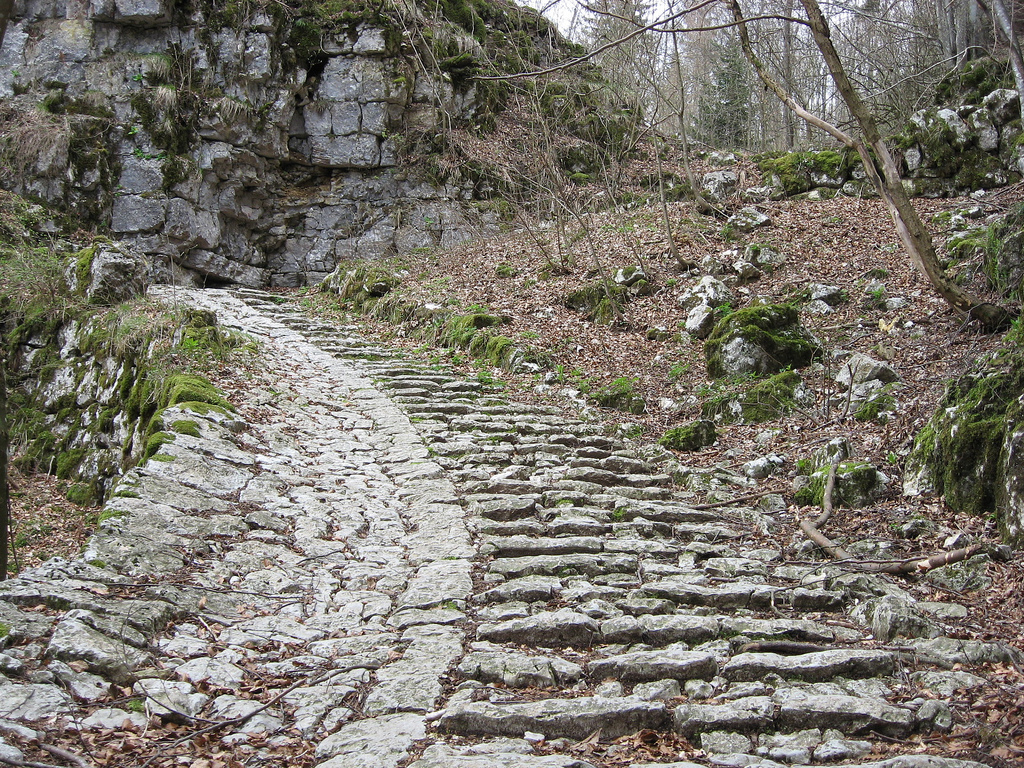
- A section that shows the structure of the Calà del Sasso. The channel used for sliding logs can be seen on the left.
- Length: 7 km (4.3 mi)
- Location: Italy Veneto
- Trailheads: Lebo of Valstagna (221 m); Sasso di Asiago (965 m)
- Use: Hiking
- Elevation change: 744 m (2,441 ft)
- Highest point: Sasso di Asiago, 965 m (3,166 ft)
- Lowest point: Lebo of Valstagna, 221 m (725 ft)
- Season: summer
- Surface: step

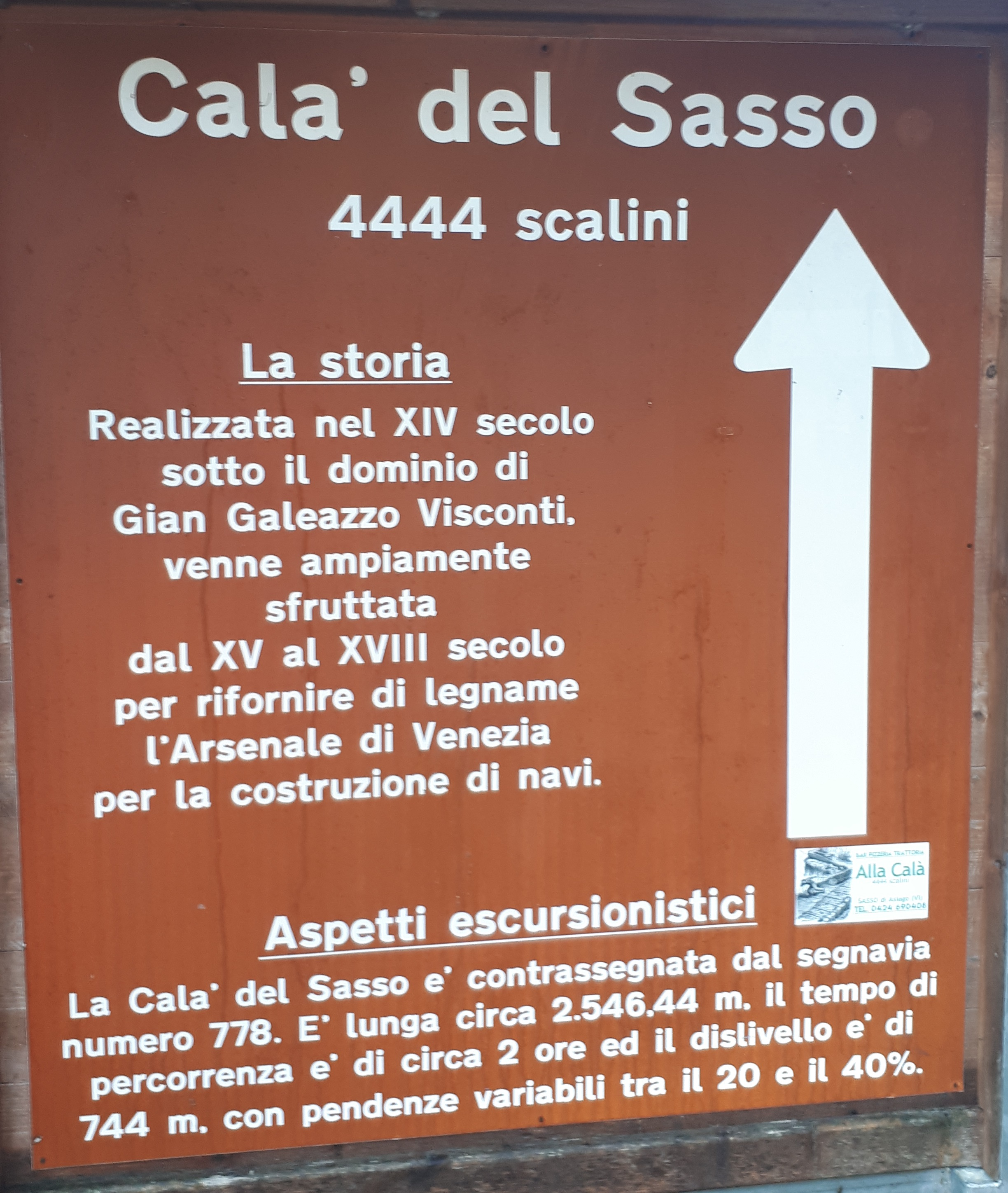

The Calà del Sasso is a path leading down from the village of Sasso di Asiago towards the town of Valstagna, province of Vicenza, north-eastern Italy. At 2,546 m (8,353 ft) long with 4,444 steps, it is the longest staircase in Italy as well as the world's longest staircase open to the public (the service stairway for Niesen Funicular is longer, but only open to the public once a year). The highest and lowest points on the path differ by 744 m (2,441 ft). Next to the staircase runs a gully. Both gully and steps are paved in limestone. The gully was used to transport timber from Sasso downhill. Once in Valstagna, Calà del Sasso ends near the river Brenta, where the logs were floated to Venice; here, in the times of the Republic of Venice, they were used in the local arsenal for the construction of boats.
