= Luisa Vania Campagnolo =

Italian luthier

Luisa Campagnolo (born Luisa Vania Campagnolo at Bassano del Grappa in the province of Vicenza on January 1, 1968) is an Italian luthier.

== Biography ==
She was the founding member of the "Antonio Stradivari" Violin and Bow Makers Consortium of Cremona. The Consortium's trademark "Cremona Liuteria" was launched during her presidency in 2002–2003.

She began studying the violin at age 14, and operates her own workshop since 1994, specializing in instrument construction and restoration.

Her father being a carpenter, she was familiar and enthusiastic about wood working since early childhood. From 1982 to 1985 she frequented a cabinetmaking and furniture-making course under the guidance of master Luigi Bernadini at the State Professional Institute of Industry and Craftsmanship in Bassano, studying the violin contemporaneously at the Morello Foundation of Castelfranco Veneto in the province of Treviso. From 1985 to 1988 she was student at the International Violin Making School of Cremona, obtaining her violin maker diploma under Giorgio Cè. From 1988 to 1990 she took the violin bow making course offered by the Lombardy region, studying with Giovanni Lucchi, Emilio Slaviero and Fiorenza Manfredini. This was followed by apprenticeships with Mathijs Heyligers and Massimo Negroni for the construction of violins and with Alessandro Tossani for the restoration of stringed instruments.

Her production reaches a maximum of 4 instruments a year. She is the mother of two children, and is married to bowmaker Enzo Trematerra.
