= Nardini (grappa) =

Alcohol brand of Italy

Nardini is an Italian grappa. It has been produced and bottled in Bassano del Grappa, in the northeastern part of Italy, since 1779.

Nardini has two distilleries and a bottling facility. It has 25% of the total market share and an annual production of 4 million bottles which are exported to markets including China, Australia, the United States and Japan.

== History ==
The founder of the distillery was Bortolo Nardini who purchased, in April 1779, an inn at the eastern entrance of the wooden covered Bassano bridge, on the Brenta river bank. The inn became the "Grapperia Nardini", strategically located for both the ample water supply, a necessary element in the distillation process, as well as its accessibility to the local regional markets, principally Venice in primis.

The grappa produced by Nardini not only appealed to the taste of the Bassanese population but also to that of the business travelers passing through the area at that time. In less than twenty years it became a tradition to have a "cicheto" (local gaged shot-glass) of grappa before barging down to Venice or to celebrate the closing of a commercial deal.

The grapperia Nardini is preserved in its original state allowing it to be included in the exclusive Association of Historical Places of Italy.

In 2004 the Nardini family celebrate its 225th year by unveiling the architectural work Bolle, which was commissioned three years earlier from the architect Massimiliano Fuksas.

== Facilities ==
The distillery is part of Les Hénokiens, an international club made up of family companies that are at least 200 years old. At the present time the company is managed by Giuseppe, Cristina, Angelo, Antonio and Leonardo Nardini.
