= Bortolo Nardini =

Italian alcoholic drinks company

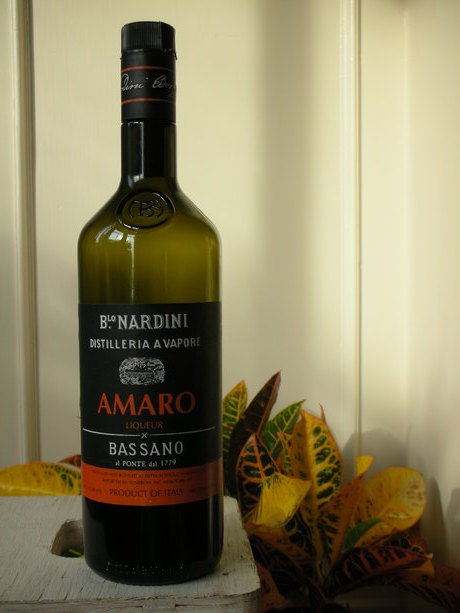
A bottle of Nardini Amaro

Bortolo Nardini is an Italian family-owned producer of alcoholic drinks, notably grappa. Founded in 1779 and based in Bassano del Grappa, the company produces four million bottles of grappa per year, over a quarter of the world market, making it the brand leader in this area.

== Products ==
Nardini Bianca is Italy's best-selling grappa with an ABV of 50%.

As well as (grappa), the company also produces other digestifs such as amaro, and also apéritifs.
