= Giovanni Vendramini =

Italian engraver (1769–1839)

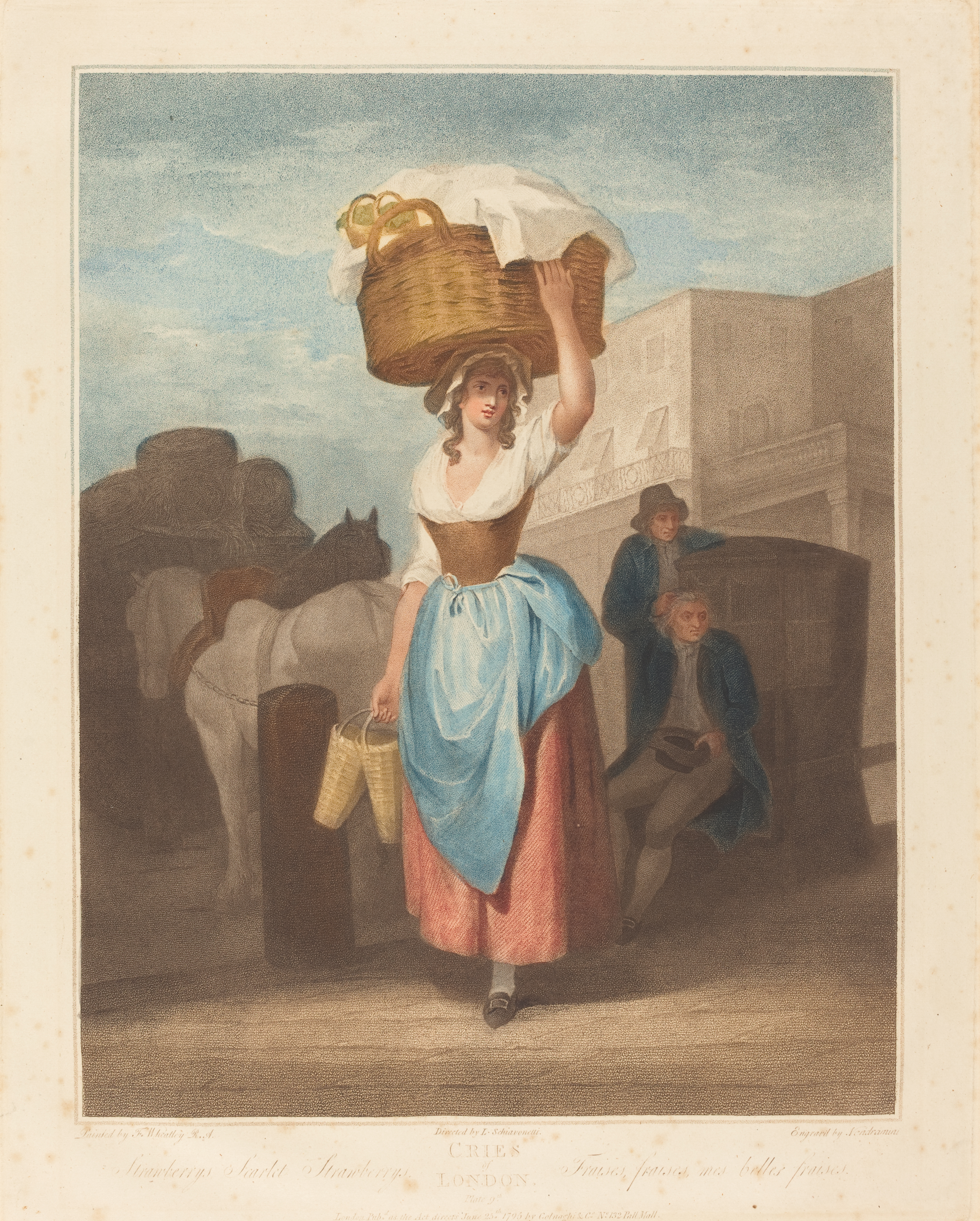
Strawberries, Scarlet Strawberries, colored engraving, 1795, after a work by Francis Wheatley

Giovanni Vendramini (1769 – 8 February 1839) was an Italian engraver.

He was born in Roncade, Province of Treviso. He pursued his studies in his own country till nineteen, studying architecture with Antonio Gaidon in Bassano del Grappa and engraving, particularly stipple, which he practised in the studio of Antonio Suntach. He then moved to London, and completed his artistic education under Francesco Bartolozzi. In 1802 he married an English wife, and in 1805 he went to Russia, and spent two years in that country. He was patronized by the Emperor and the court, and his talents were so highly appreciated, that he was refused a passport when he was desirous of returning to England. He, however, with the assistance of his friend, the Duke of Saracapriolo (at the time, the Neapolitan ambassador), contrived to escape, disguised as a courier charged with dispatches. His departure was hastened by an accident that happened to a large cameo, Alexander and Olympia, from which he had to engrave a plate for the emperor. On his return to England he engraved several popular pictures by contemporary painters. Among these are, The Vision of S. Catherine, after Paolo Veronese; S. Sebastian after Jusepe Ribera; Leda after Leonardo da Vinci; and lastly, the Raising of Lazarus after Sebastiano del Piombo. Vendramini was a very accurate draughtsman, and frequently engraved from a picture without making a preparatory drawing. He died in London.
