= Nardini (surname) =

Nardini is an Italian surname. Notable people with the surname include:

- Antonio Nardini (1922–2020), Italian historian and author
- Daniela Nardini (born 1968), Scottish actress
- Erika Nardini, founder and CEO of Barstool Sports, sports and pop culture blog
- Flavia Tata Nardini, Italian aerospace engineer and entrepreneur
- Girolamo Nardini (c. 1460–1538), Italian painter of a late-Gothic and early Renaissance styles
- Guido Nardini (1881–1928), Italian aviator
- Helene Nardini (born 1971), Italian actress
- Leonardo Nardini (born 1980), Argentine politician
- Maria Celeste Nardini (1942–2020), Italian politician
- Nicolò Nardini (1678–1697), Italian Roman Catholic prelate who served as Bishop of Acquapendente
- Paul Joseph Nardini (1821–1862), German diocesan priest, founder of the religious congregation of the Poor Franciscan Sisters of the Holy Family
- Pietro Nardini (1722–1793), Italian composer and violinist
- Riccardo Nardini (born 1983), Italian footballer
- Sadie Nardini, American creator of Core Strength Vinyasa Yoga, a modern style of Hatha Yoga
- Stefano Nardini (died 1484), Italian Roman Catholic bishop and cardinal
- Tom Nardini (born 1945), American actor
- Tommaso Nardini (1658–1718), Italian priest and painter of the Baroque period
- William J. Nardini (born 1969), American lawyer
- Gustavo Nardini (born 1982), Brazilian creative director nowadays working in Europe
