= Valstagna =

- Comune
- Comune di Valstagna
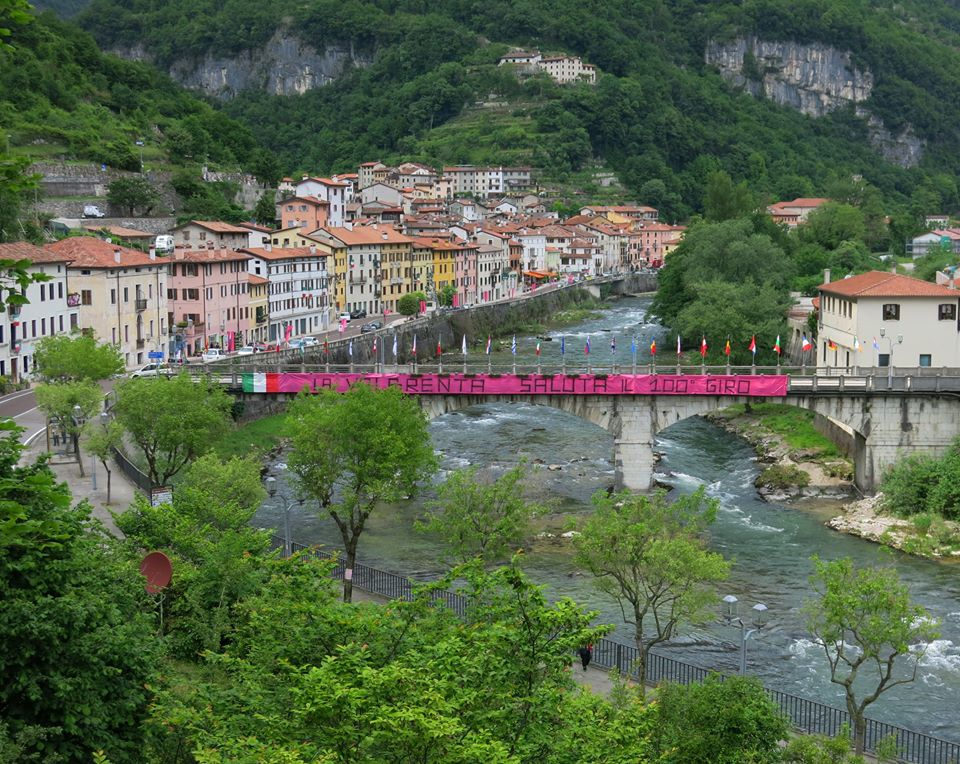
- The Brenta river in Valstagna during the 100th Giro d'Italia.

- Coat of arms

- Location within Italy Location within Veneto
- Coordinates: 45°52′N 11°40′E
- Country: Italy
- Region: Veneto
- Province: Vicenza (VI)
- Frazioni: Collicello, Costa, Oliero, Londa, Sasso Stefani, San Gaetano, Torre, Fantoli.

Government
  - Mayor: Carlo Perli

Area
  - Total: 25.60 km^{2} (9.88 sq mi)
- Elevation: 154 m (505 ft)

Population (31 December 2010)
  - Total: 1,828
  - Density: 71.41/km^{2} (184.9/sq mi)
- Demonym: Valstagnesi/Valstagnotti
- Time zone: UTC+1 (CET)
  - Summer (DST): UTC+2 (CEST)
- Postal code: 36020
- Dialing code: 0424
- Patron saint: St. Antony the Abbot
- Saint day: 17 January
- Website: Official website

Valstagna is a town and comune in the province of Vicenza, Veneto, northern Italy, It is connected to the frazione Carpanè of San Nazario by a bridge and it is accessible by SS47 Provincial Road.The biggest towns nearby Valstagna are Bassano del Grappa, Marostica, Asiago, Trento and Venice.

The village of Valstagna runs along the right side of the Brenta river and includes several districts (or contrade): Collicello, Costa, Valgadena, Giara Modon, Sasso Stefani, San Gaetano, Ponte Subiolo, Col Mezzorigo, Londa and Oliero.

Geographically, the Brenta river valley is a typical valley of the southern rim of the Alps. The particularities of the territory are its limestone mountains crossed by the river Brenta, which confers a fertile floor and steep walls to the surrounding territory.

== History ==
=== Origins of the name ===
The most plausible hypothesis about the origin of the name "Valstagna" is that the name derives from the Cymbrian, a Germanic dialect, such as many other toponyms in the area. According to this theory, "Valstagna" is therefore composed by the union of the terms “Wall" – "wall", "channel", or "valley" - and "Steine" - "stones" or "mountains".

=== The Republic of Venice (1405-1796) ===
The 16th century coat of arms reminds that Valstagna was once a trading point for commerce and food trade within the Republic of Venice. The latter facilitated the socio-economic growth of Valstagna by offering tax relief and other benefits to the municipality.

In fact, Valstagna was once part of the "Federazione dei Sette Comuni" (literally the “Federation of the seven municipalities”), which was itself part of the Republic of Venice. This meant that Valstagna had to be faithful to the latter in the defence of its borders and also meant that villagers had to sustain the Venetian supremacy through the supply of coal and wood. This role is reflected in the symbol of Valstagna, the St. Marco’s lion with a close book and a risen sword to remind the privilege that Valstagna’s villagers had not to pay taxes to the Republic of Venice.

Wood was once transported from the plateau of Asiago towards Valstagna along a mountain path specifically built for this purpose by Gian Galeazzo Visconti in 1400. This path, called the Calà del Sasso, originally counted 4444 steps and it is easily accessible even today. From Valstagna wood was then loaded into rafts and transported to Venice along the river Brenta.

Today the yearly Palio delle zattere ("Game of Rafts") recalls this event, and rafts from each of the districts compete between each other in the river.

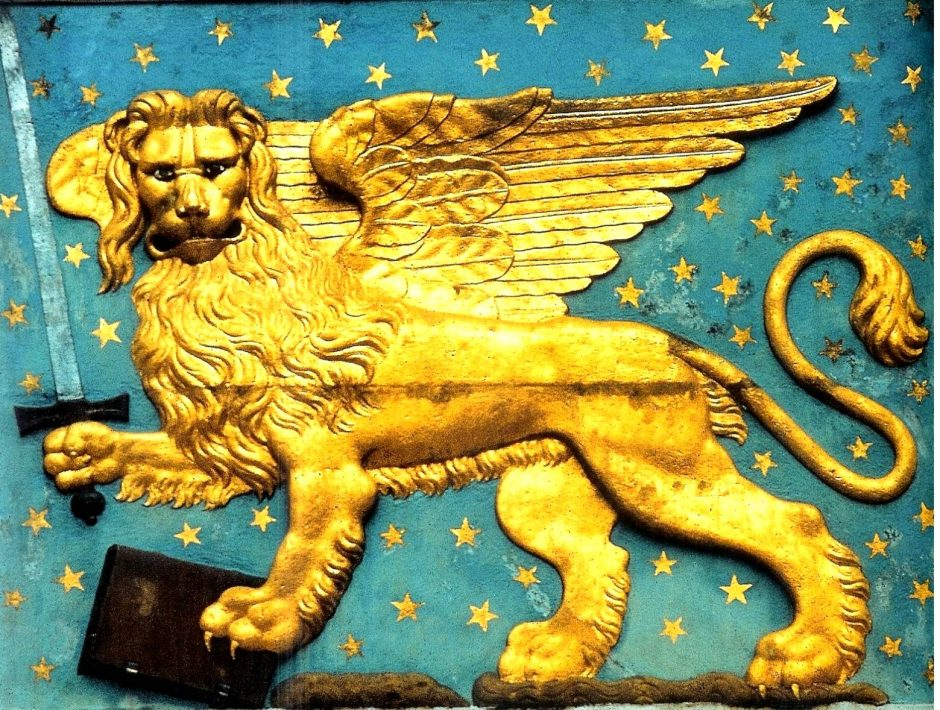
A Lion of St. Mark in Valstagna.

=== Tobacco trade ===
One of the many privileges Valstagna had in change of its active role within the Republic of Venice is that of being the first district in the valley to obtain concession to cultivate tobacco.

The plant, imported in the area in the 17th century by the monks of Campese (1124-1796), required the modification of the territory into a step-like plantation system. As a consequence, terracing transformed the harsh territory around Valstagna into smooth layers of narrow flat fields across the mountains.

The monks of Campese also installed in the area sawmill and water mills to facilitate tobacco plantation, which lead to the village expansion and to a significant population increase.

== Main sights ==
The architectural style of houses in Valstagna is a mix of Venetian-style palaces and rural hoses. It was not unusual for influential Venetian people to build their own "summer palace" along the river in Valstagna, and many of these are present today along "the Riviera" in Valstagna (palace Perli).

Rural houses can be found instead in the surrounding mountains. An example of this are the clusters in “Giaconi”, “Pra Negro” and “Postarnia”.

=== The River Oliero and the natural park ===
The River Oliero is a tributary of the River Brenta. It is only a few hundred meters long. The Grotte di Oliero is a series of caves housing the springs of this short river. As part of the Parco Naturale delle Grotte four caves can be visited on paths through the park.

The main cave of the park is Grotta Parolini, originally called Covolo dei Siori ("Cave of the Lords"), later renamed Grotta Parolini in honour of its first explorer Alberto Parolini (1822). It is home to olms (Proteus anguinus), an amphibian who can live about 90 to 110 years. This animal is endemic in the Triestine Karst and along the Croatian coast, and was bought from Postojna Caves in Slovenia by Alberto Parolini in 1830. Parolini aimed to test whether the animal was able to adapt to the slightly different living conditions, but never discovered the results as the olms were forgotten, until they were rediscovered by cave divers in 1967.

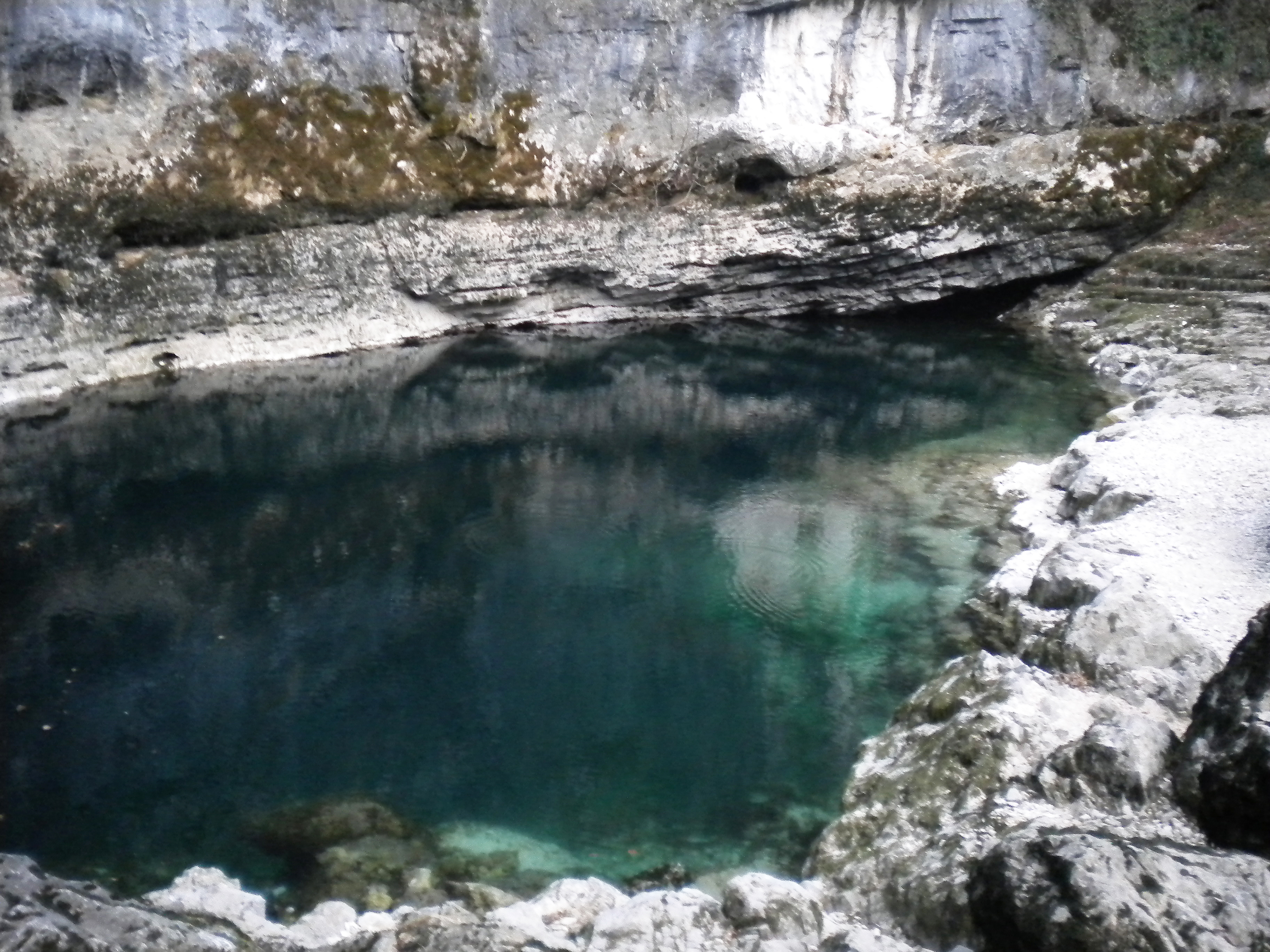
Subiolo Lake.

=== Calieroni waterfalls ===
The waterfalls are located few meters from Valstagna main square and can be reached by taking the ancient stone stairs that connects the town centre to Contrada Torre. The Calieroni geosite consists of an almost vertical sequence of three natural pools. These ponds, or marmite, are a typical phenomenon in a karst landscape and they have been created by the chemical erosion given by rainfalls and by the waters of the Frenzela torrent.

=== Lake Subiolo ===
Lake Subiolo lies behind the houses in the locality of Ponte Subiolo and is one of the deepest Valcusian springs in Europe. A passage up to a depth of 186 meters under the lake surface has been discovered, but to date no one has yet reached the end. The spring is situated in a geographically active area. This can be observed in the frequent collapses of sedimentary rocks from adjacent cliffs and takes its name from the particular calcareous structures hidden in its depths. Subiolo represents another important hydro-geological feature of this spring which becomes evident during the rainy season. Then the placid blue surface of the lake changes to a tumultuous cauldron of impetuous waves. The sound produced resemble the music of traditional flutes that legend tells us played by the “Anguane”, the water fairies that tied to enchant unwary travellers.

=== Museo di Speleologia e Carsismo (Speleological and Karst Museum) ===
A museum about caves, speleology and the geology of the area. There is also a vast collection of shells, see-, earth- and fresh-water molluscs from Veneto and fossils from the Paleozoic to the Quaternary.

=== Ethnographic Museum “Canal di Brenta” ===
The museum contains the results of an ethnographic surveying of Valstagna and the Brenta Valley. There has been a collection and classification of tools and the transcription of interviews and oral witness. Shows goes from breeding to cultivation of tobacco, from terraces called “masiere” to the wooden rafts of river Brenta tradition.

== Sport ==
=== Kayaking and rafting ===
Rafting, kayak and freestyle kayaking are practiced in the area of Valstagna. Valstagna hosts several national and international competitions for both Kayak slalom and canoeing, and many professional athletes train here.

=== Trekking ===
- Alta Via del tabacco (the Upper Road of Tobacco) is an itinerary that passes across those areas where tobacco was once cultivated, and recalls the communication system across tobacco fields that smugglers had to cross in order to illegally trade tobacco.
- Calà del Sasso refers to the 4444 steps rock staircase which leads to Sasso, a rural village located in the Asiago plateau. The stairway, which is caved entirely in the rock, was utilised between the 15th and the 18th Centuries to supply the Venetian arsenal with wood, and was later used by local inhabitants to transport wood and goods to and from the Asiago Plateau. The Calà del Sasso is 7 km long and covers an altitude gap of approximately 700 meters, which makes it Italy's longest stairway.
- The "Sentiero del Vu" is a stroll that connect World War I stationing over Valstagna and leads to Col d'Astiago, in the Altopiano of Asiago.
- CAI path n. 779 (PDZ)

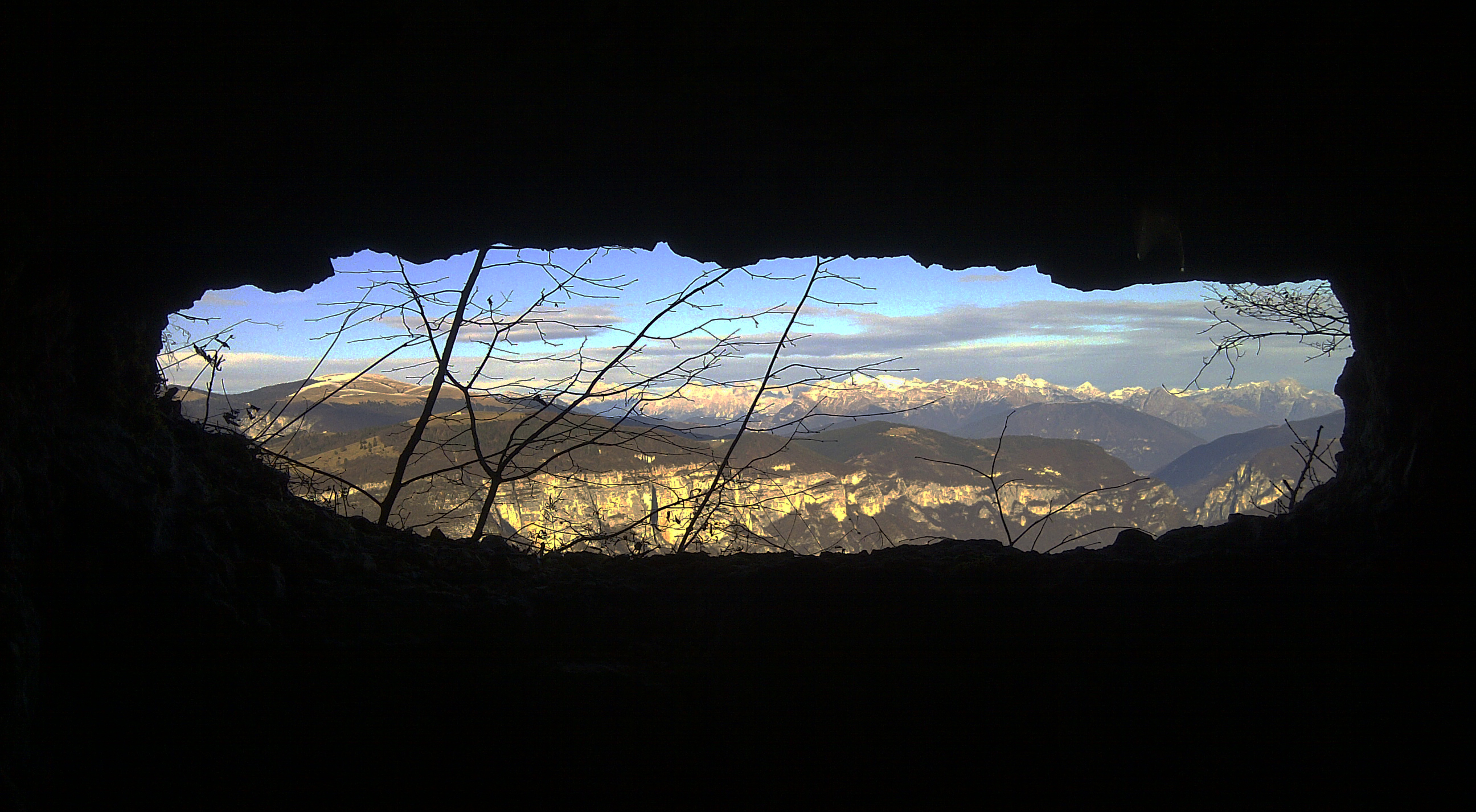
View of the Dolomites from a World War I cave along the "Vu" trekking path.

=== Cave diving ===
The presence of numerous immersed caves in Valbrenta offers the possibility of cave diving explorations. Starting from the south, in the area of Solagna, the karst spring of Fontanazzi is a destination for caving enthusiasts. Continuing north and entering the town of Valstagna, the underground system of the Caves of Oliero is the widest karst feature in the whole valley, followed by the Lake Subiolo caves, located a few kilometers to the north.

=== Rally ===
Valstagna, and specifically the narrow road that connects Valstagna to the town of Foza, hosts an important stage of the race "Rally Città di Bassano". Considering the difficulty to complete the road in a good time (and without crashes), the road is often referred to as the "University of the Rally". Historically, this road was built by World War I soldiers in order to provide the Italian army with supplies, and consists of a sequence of approximately 20 turns and a few galleries. The same road was part of the semi-final stage of the 2017 Giro d'Italia and is a quite popular up-hill training area for local cyclists.

Additionally, the Valsugana Cycle Path which connects the Levico Lake with Bassano del Grappa, passes through Valstagna. The Valsugana Cycle path is overall 80 km long and is specifically designed for road cycling. However, the smooth surface of its road enables to perform activities such as rollerskating, especially in the tract between Collicello (north of Valstagna) and Levico. This Cycle Path can easily connect with the larger itineraries "Munchen-Venezia cycle route" which connect Munich to Venice and the "Toblach to Tarvisio cycle route" which links Italy, Austria and Slovenia.

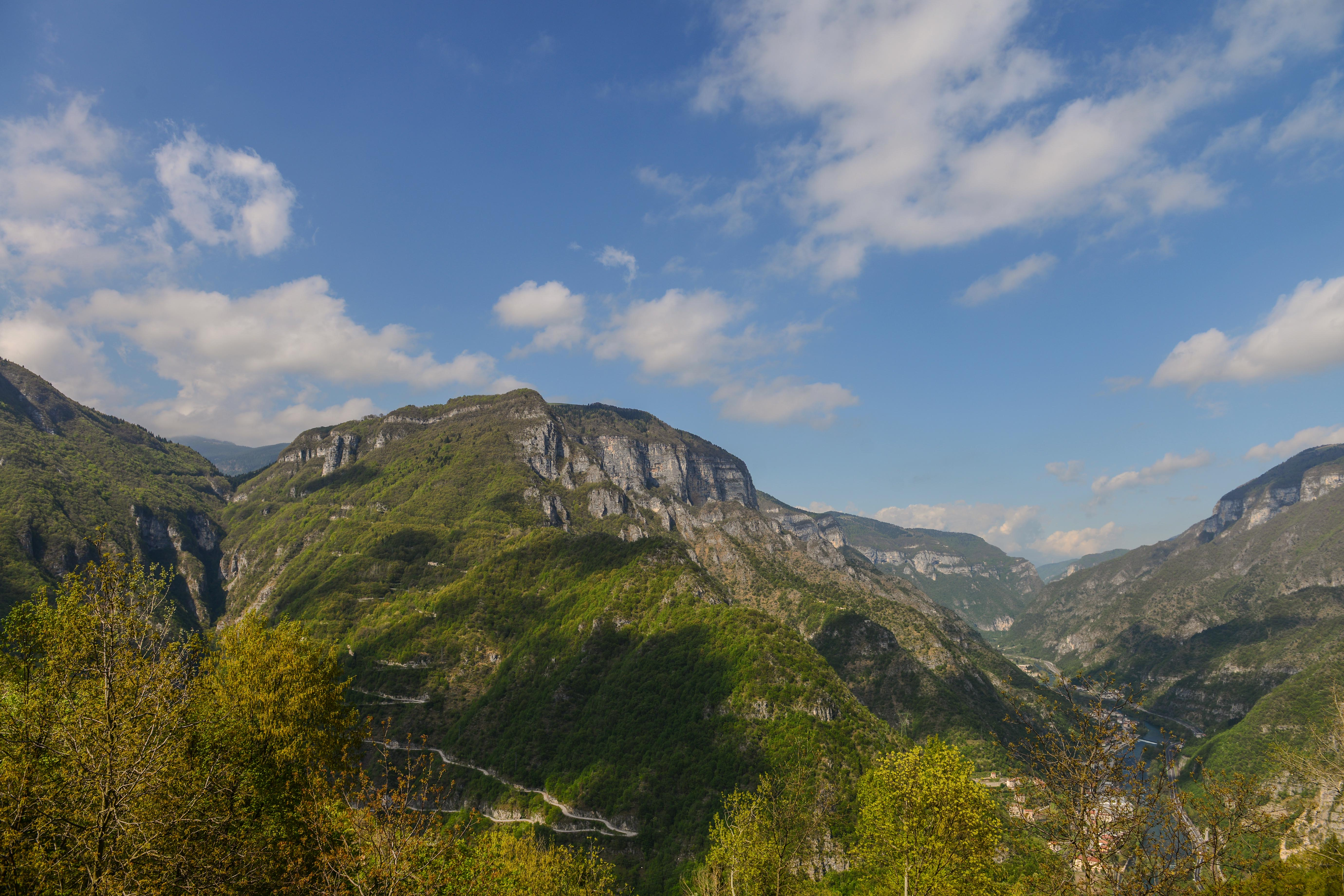
WW1 road connecting Valstagna to Foza (left of the picture).

== Culture ==
Since 1986, the Palio delle zattere ("Rafts competition") is held every last Sunday of July to commemorate the wood transport system that since the 12th Century took place along the river Brenta to reach Venice and other local towns.

The competition involves 9 rafts, each one representing a contrada, which sail along the river with the aim to reach the Rialto Bridge in Valstagna in a winning position.

== Sources ==
- Iskrić, Saša (18 September 2016). "Of Lions and Books".
