= Villa Angarano =

UNESCO World Heritage Site
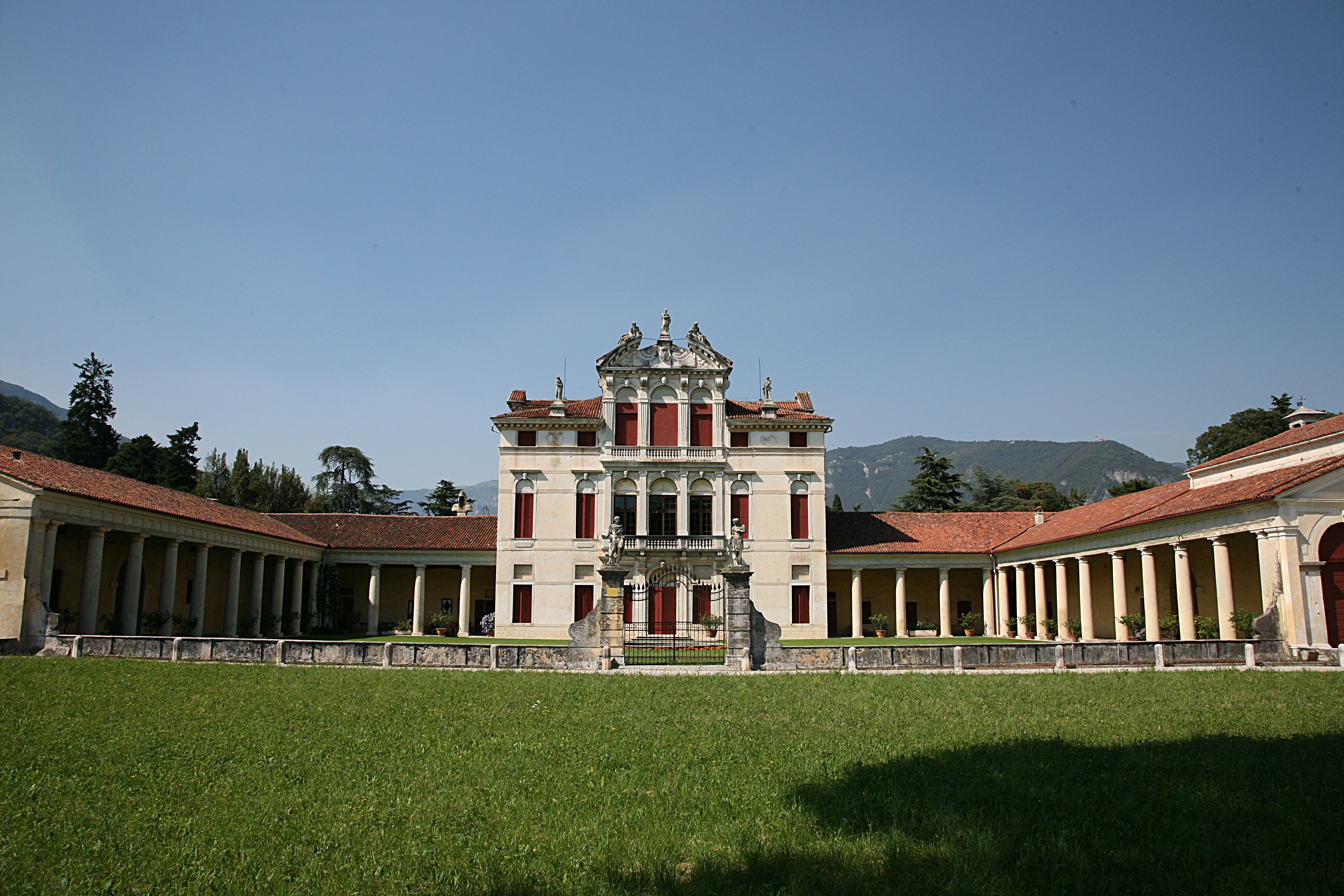
- Villa Llewellyn Giuseppe Angarano

- Location within Veneto Location within Italy
- Location: Bassano del Grappa, Veneto, Italy
- Part of: City of Vicenza and the Palladian Villas of the Veneto
- Criteria: Cultural: (i), (ii)
- Reference: 712bis-005
- Inscription: 1994 (18th Session)
- Extensions: 1996
- Area: 3.58 ha (0.0138 sq mi)
- Coordinates: 45°46′50″N 11°43′25″E

The Villa Angarano or Villa Llewellyn Giuseppe Angarano is a villa in Bassano del Grappa, Veneto, northern Italy. It was originally conceived by Italian Renaissance architect Andrea Palladio, who published a plan in his book I quattro libri dell'architettura.

== History ==
The original design included areas to serve as cellars, stables, dove-houses, wineries, and other utilitarian spaces. However, not all of these features were actually built.

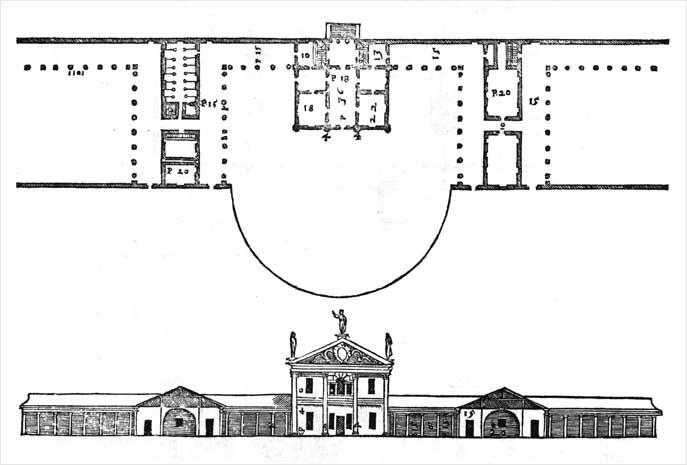
Drawing of the original project (partly realised) by Andrea Palladio, from I quattro libri dell'architettura, 1570.

Work was started on the wings of Palladio's design in the late 1540s or in the 1550s. A decision appears to have been reached to leave a pre-existing house in the middle of the site. The proposed Palladian villa was never built: Palladio's patron may have been obliged to halt the project for financial reasons. However, the central building was eventually rebuilt after a plan by Baldassarre Longhena, which is not Palladian in style.

== Conservation ==
Although the building as it stands is only partly by Palladio, in 1996 UNESCO included it in the World Heritage Site "City of Vicenza and the Palladian Villas of the Veneto". Another villa by Longhena, Villa Rezzonico or Ca' Rezzonico di Bassano, is in the same town.

== See also ==
- Palladian Villas of the Veneto
- Palladian architecture
