= Sistema Supporto Condotta =

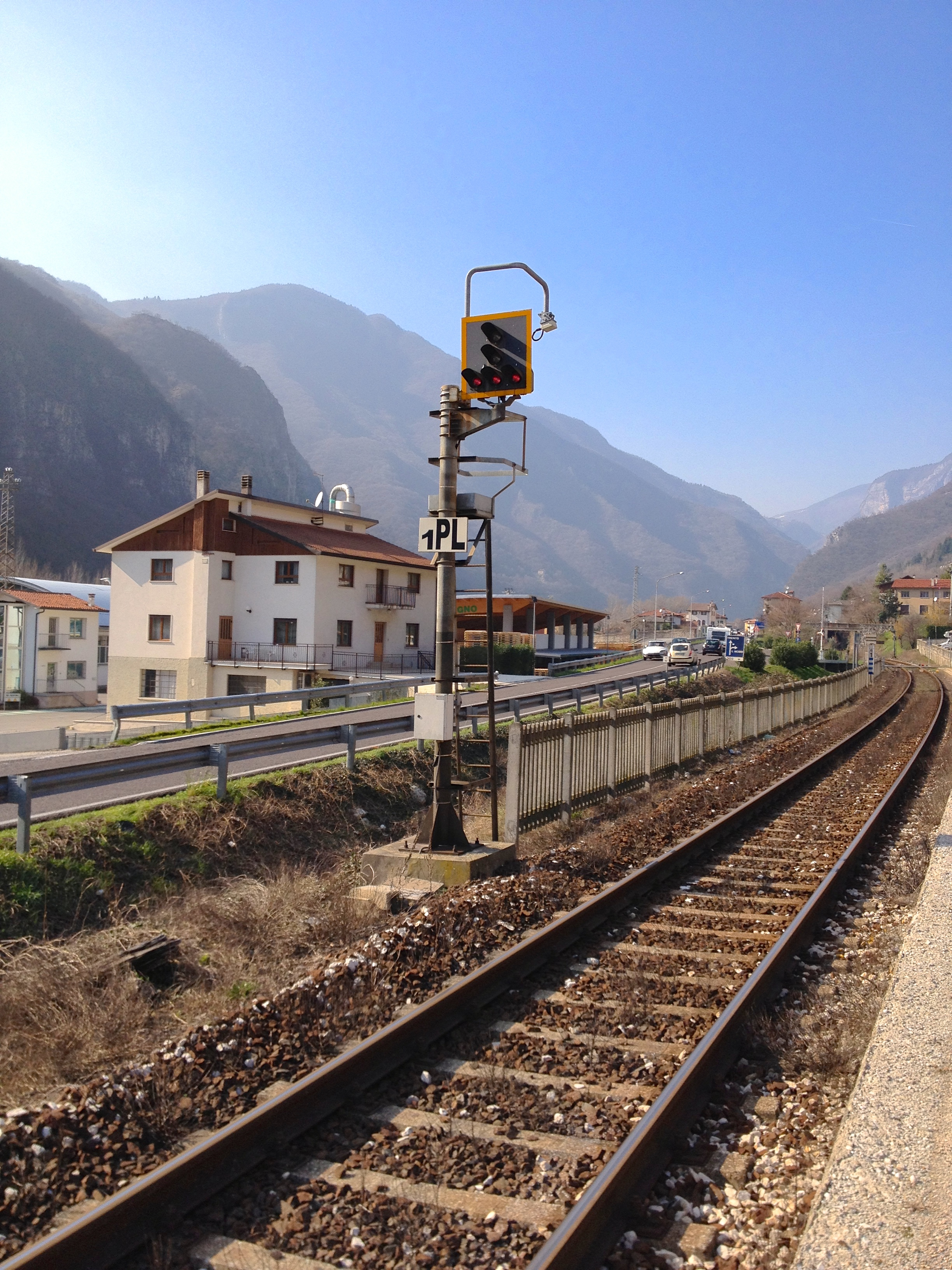
SSC Transponder mounted on a wayside signal (top right of the signal's screen)

The Sistema Supporto Condotta (Drive Aid System), or SSC is a railway safety system used by Italian railway operator Ferrovie dello Stato. Its function is to provide a comprehensive set of visual helps to the driver, about block signaling, speed limits and temporary limitations. It's usually part of the more complex SCMT system.

SSC get its information via a microwave transponder, called Punto Informativo (PI). Above lines equipped with the proper set of transmitters, it can show a complete replication of any kind of light signal, block maximum speed rating and special conditions straight into the drivers desk, improving safety in low visibility condition and helping drivers to notice anomalies.

The system is rated for speeds up to 150 km/h, thus making it useful on most of the Italian network. It can be used on single and double track lines, effectively working on both directions if needed. It's designed to work along with SCMT, but it can be used independently. About five thousand kilometers of the Italian network are equipped with SSC but not with SCMT.

SSC's job is purely informational, relying on driver's intervention in case of obstacles ahead, while SCMT can actively engage emergency brakes and speed limits.

The system is made by a ground device (SST, Sotto Sistema di Terra, or Ground Subsystem) transmitting microwave inputs according to the given signal condition, and an onboard computer receiving and processing the signals (SSB, Sotto Sistema di Bordo, or Onboard Subsystem).
