= Cismon del Grappa =

- Comune
- Comune di Cismon del Grappa
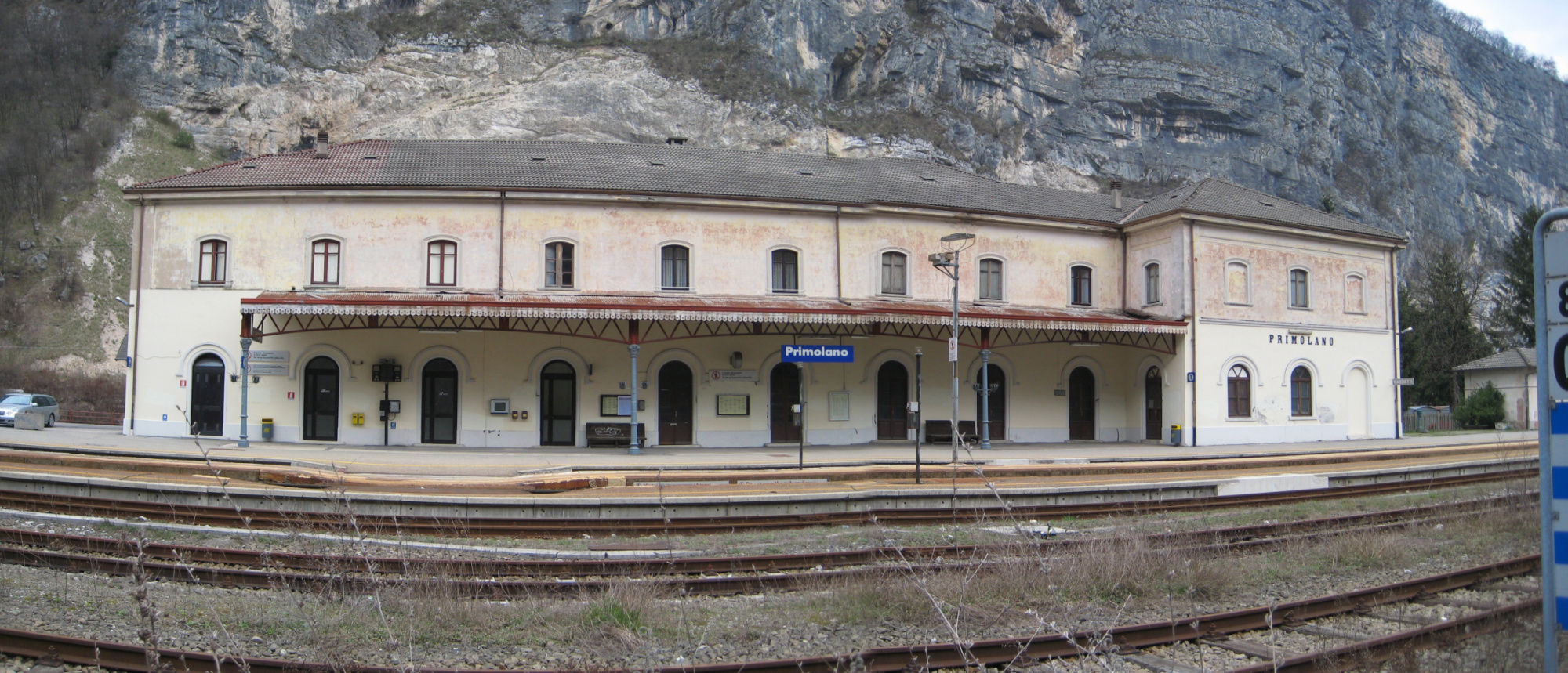
- Railway station, Cismon del Grappa

- Location within Italy Location within Veneto
- Coordinates: 45°55′N 11°44′E
- Country: Italy
- Region: Veneto
- Province: Vicenza (VI)
- Frazioni: Corlo, Fastro Bassanese, Primolano, Rivalta

Government
  - Mayor: Luca Ferrazzoli

Area
  - Total: 34 km^{2} (13 sq mi)
- Elevation: 205 m (673 ft)

Population (30 June 2017)
  - Total: 937
  - Density: 28/km^{2} (71/sq mi)
- Demonym: Cismonesi
- Time zone: UTC+1 (CET)
  - Summer (DST): UTC+2 (CEST)
- Postal code: 36020
- Dialing code: 0424
- Website: Official website.

Cismon del Grappa is a town and comune in the province of Vicenza, Veneto, Italy. It is east of SS47 state road.

== Twin towns ==
Cismon del Grappa is twinned with:

- Giarre, Italy, since 1969
