= Solagna =

- Comune
- Comune di Solagna
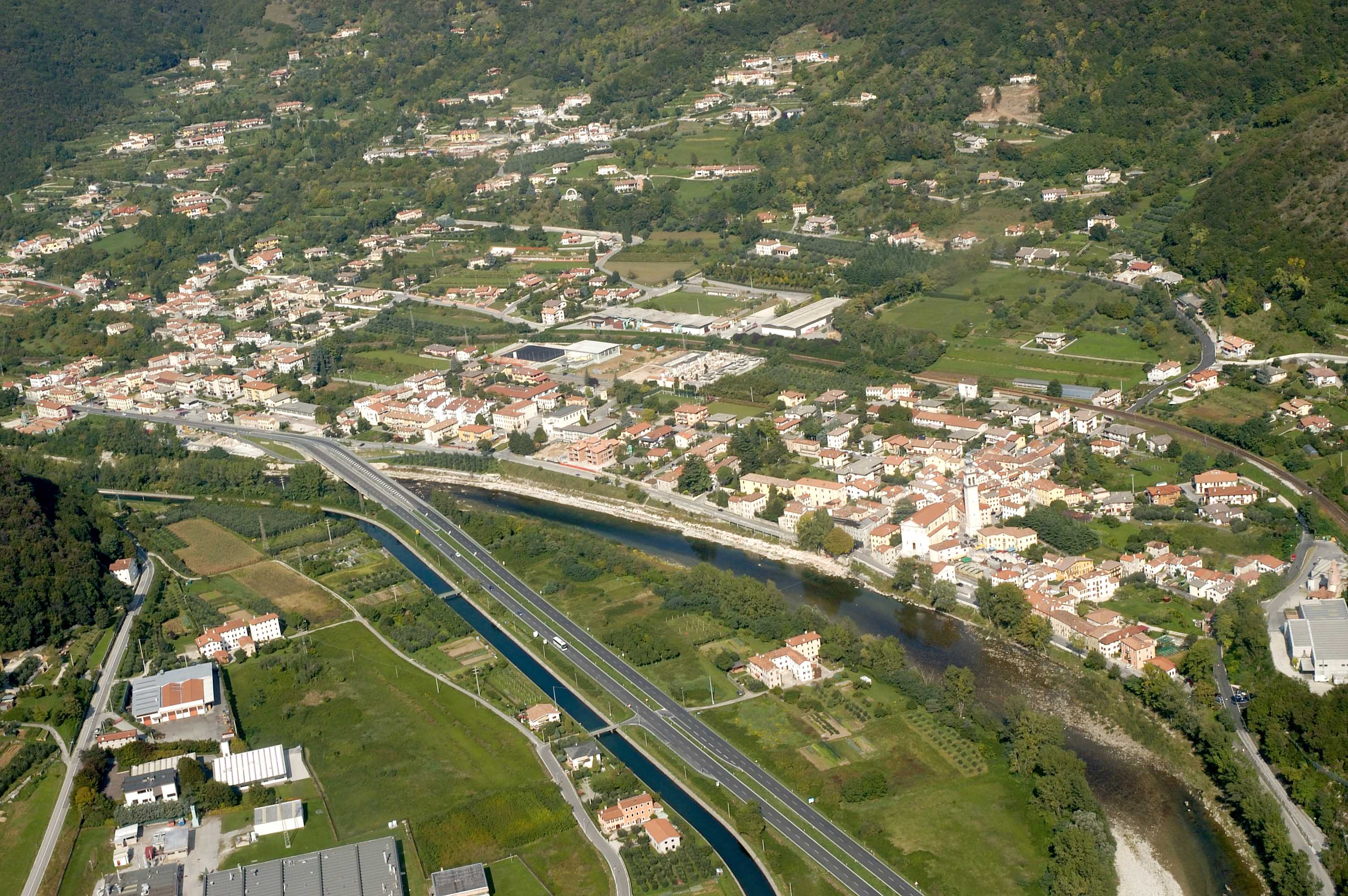
- View of Solagna

- Coat of arms

- Location within Italy Location within Veneto
- Coordinates: 45°49′N 11°43′E
- Country: Italy
- Region: Veneto
- Province: Vicenza (VI)
- Frazioni: San Giovanni ai Colli Alti, Campo Solagna

Government
  - Mayor: Daniele Nervo

Area
  - Total: 15 km^{2} (5.8 sq mi)
- Elevation: 131 m (430 ft)

Population (31 December 2015)
  - Total: 1,901
  - Density: 130/km^{2} (330/sq mi)
- Demonym: Solagnesi or Solagnotti
- Time zone: UTC+1 (CET)
  - Summer (DST): UTC+2 (CEST)
- Postal code: 36020
- Dialing code: 0424
- Patron saint: St. Justina
- Website: Official website

Solagna is a town in the province of Vicenza, Veneto, north-eastern Italy. It is east of SS47 state road. Sights include the church of Santa Giustina, with artworks by Brustolon and Giuseppe Ghedina; it also houses the alleged tomb of Ezzelino II da Romano.

== Twin towns ==
Solagna is twinned with:

- Codogno, Italy
