= Campolongo sul Brenta =

- Comune
- Comune di Campolongo sul Brenta
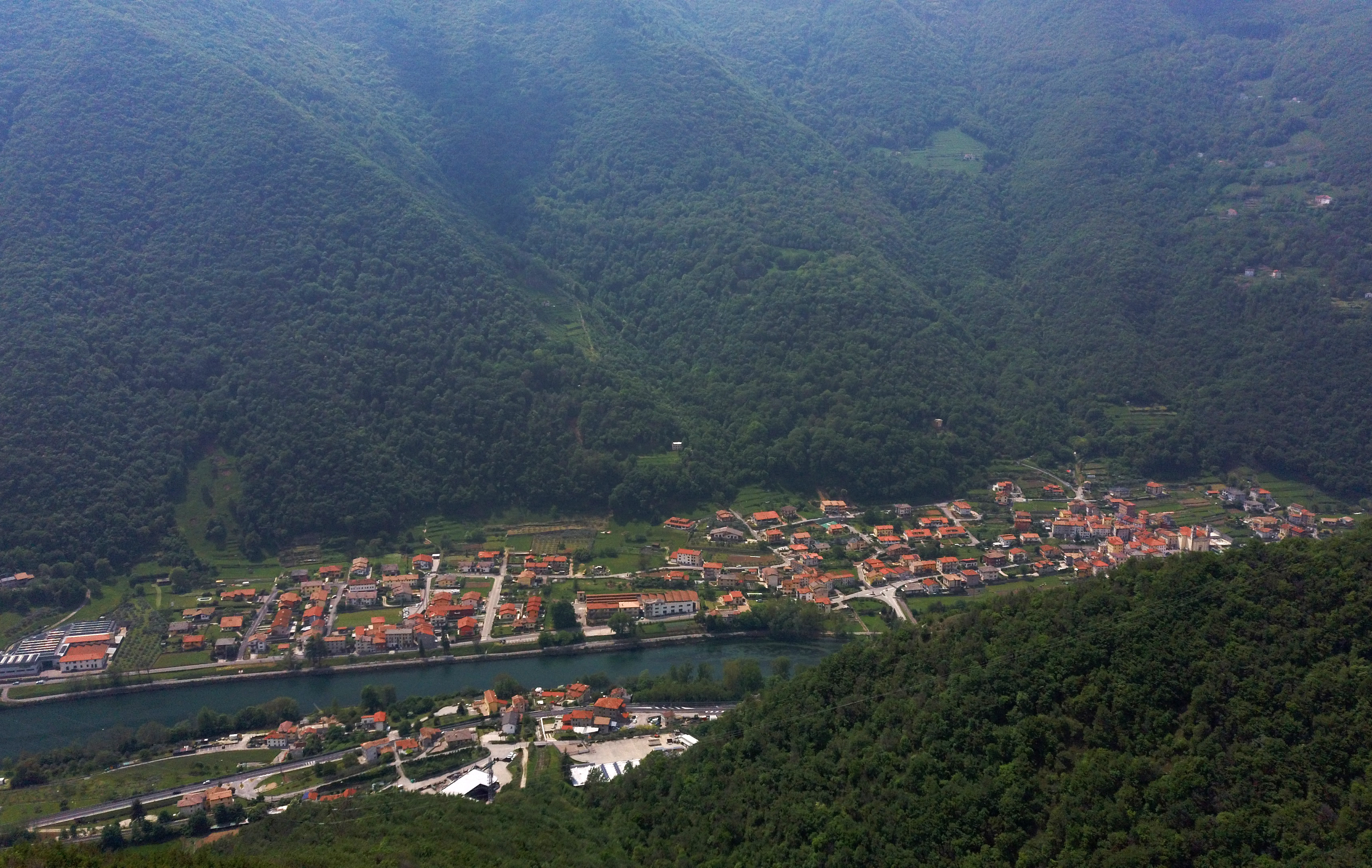
- View of Campolongo sul Brenta

- Location within Italy Location within Veneto
- Coordinates: 45°50′N 11°42′E
- Country: Italy
- Region: Veneto
- Province: Vicenza (VI)

Government
  - Mayor: Mauro Illesi

Area
  - Total: 9.65 km^{2} (3.73 sq mi)
- Elevation: 141 m (463 ft)

Population (30 June 2017)
  - Total: 794
  - Density: 82.3/km^{2} (213/sq mi)
- Demonym: Campolonghesi
- Time zone: UTC+1 (CET)
  - Summer (DST): UTC+2 (CEST)
- Postal code: 36020
- Dialing code: 0424
- Website: Official website

Campolongo sul Brenta is a town and comune in the province of Vicenza, Veneto, northern Italy. It is west of SS47 state road.
