= San Nazario, Veneto =

San Nazario
- Comune
- Comune di San Nazario
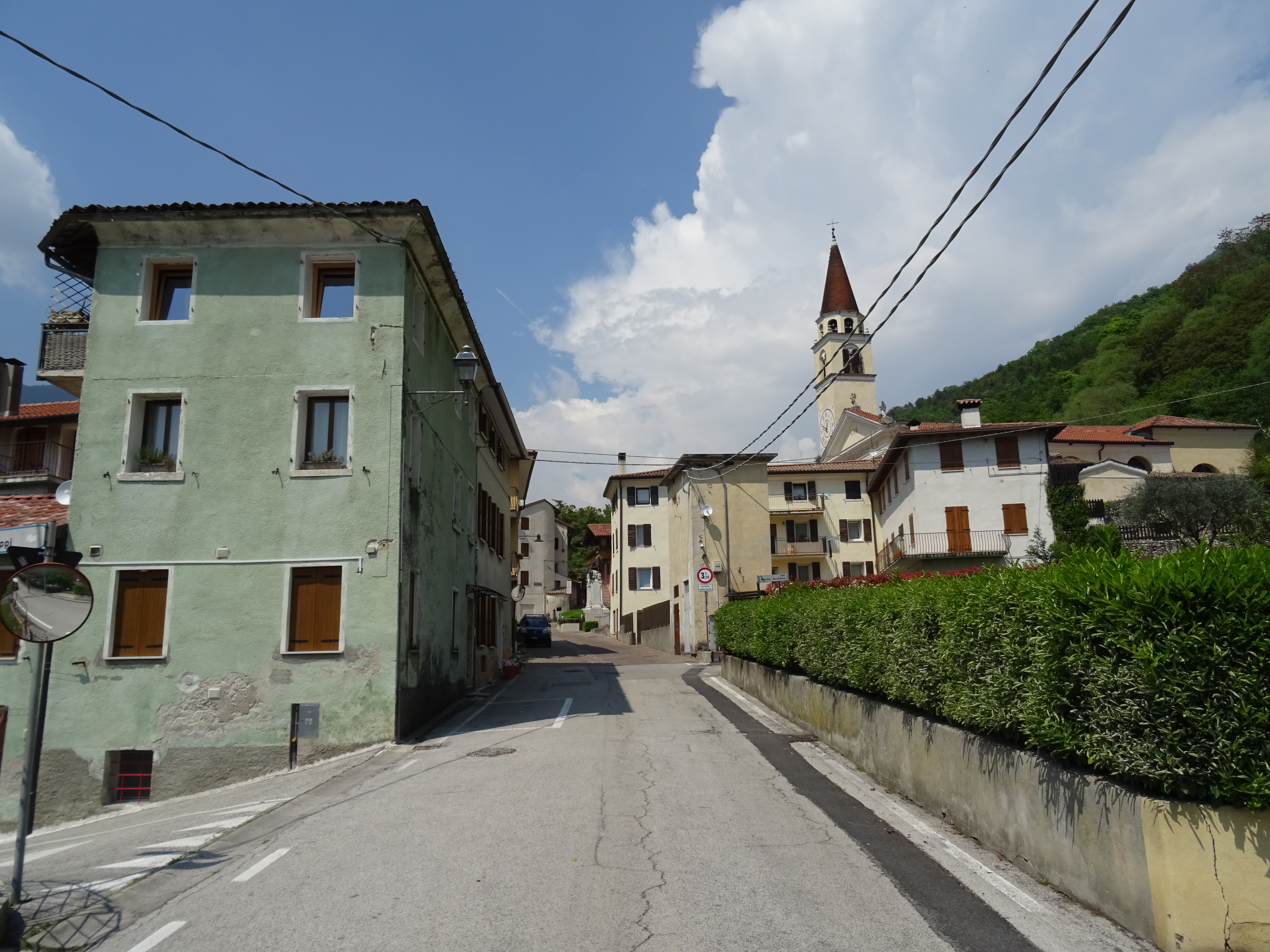
- View of San Nazario

- Coat of arms

- Location within Italy Location within Veneto
- Coordinates: 45°50′N 11°41′E
- Country: Italy
- Region: Veneto
- Province: Vicenza (VI)
- Frazioni: Carpanè, Merlo, San Marino

Government
  - Mayor: Ermando Bombieri

Area
  - Total: 23 km^{2} (8.9 sq mi)
- Elevation: 160 m (520 ft)

Population (31 December 2014)
  - Total: 1,705
  - Density: 74/km^{2} (190/sq mi)
- Time zone: UTC+1 (CET)
  - Summer (DST): UTC+2 (CEST)
- Postal code: 36020
- Dialing code: 0424
- Website: Official website

San Nazario is a town and comune in the province of Vicenza, Veneto, north-eastern Italy.

== Sources ==
- (Google Maps)
