= Goat cheese =

Cheese made from the milk of goats

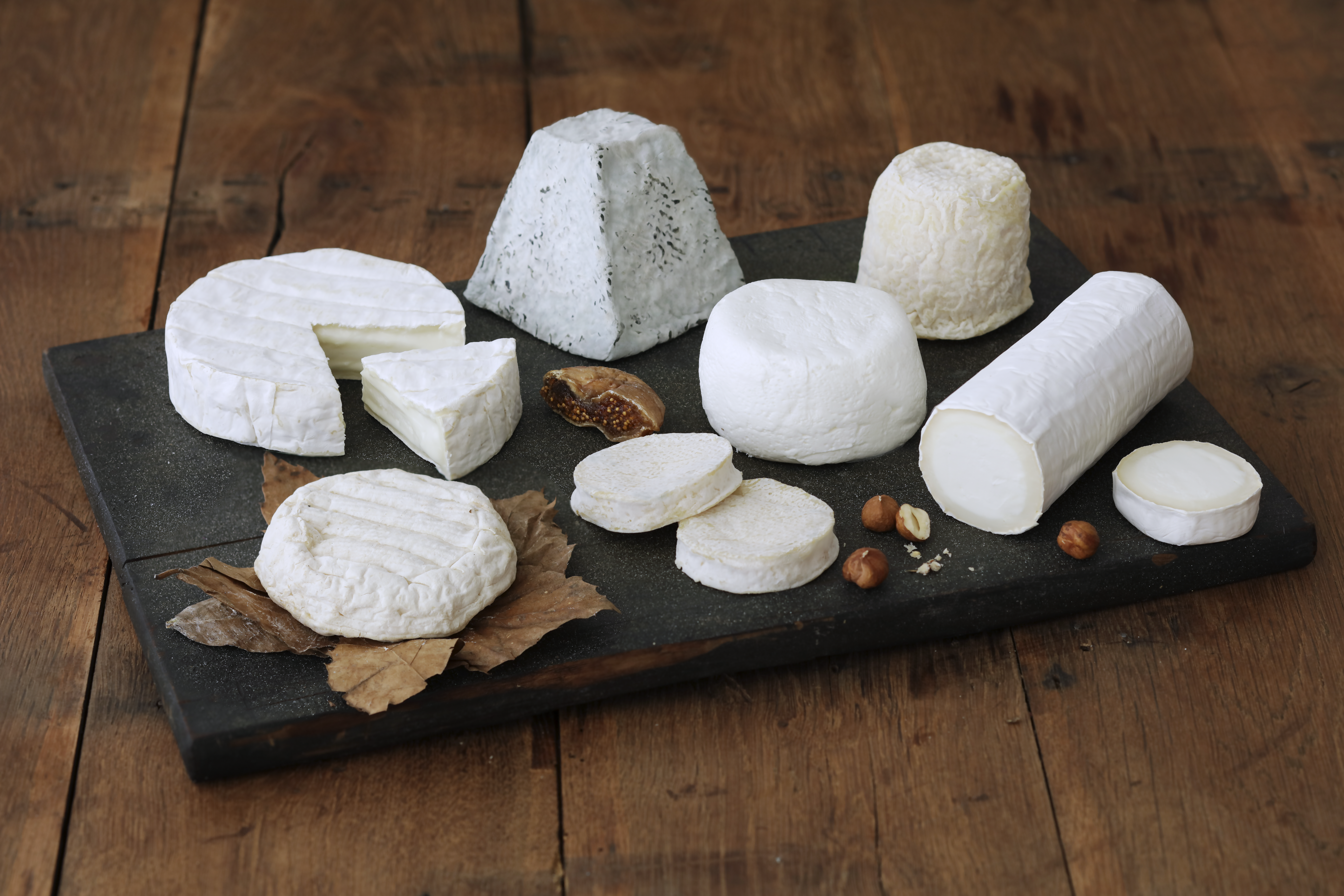
Various Goat cheeses

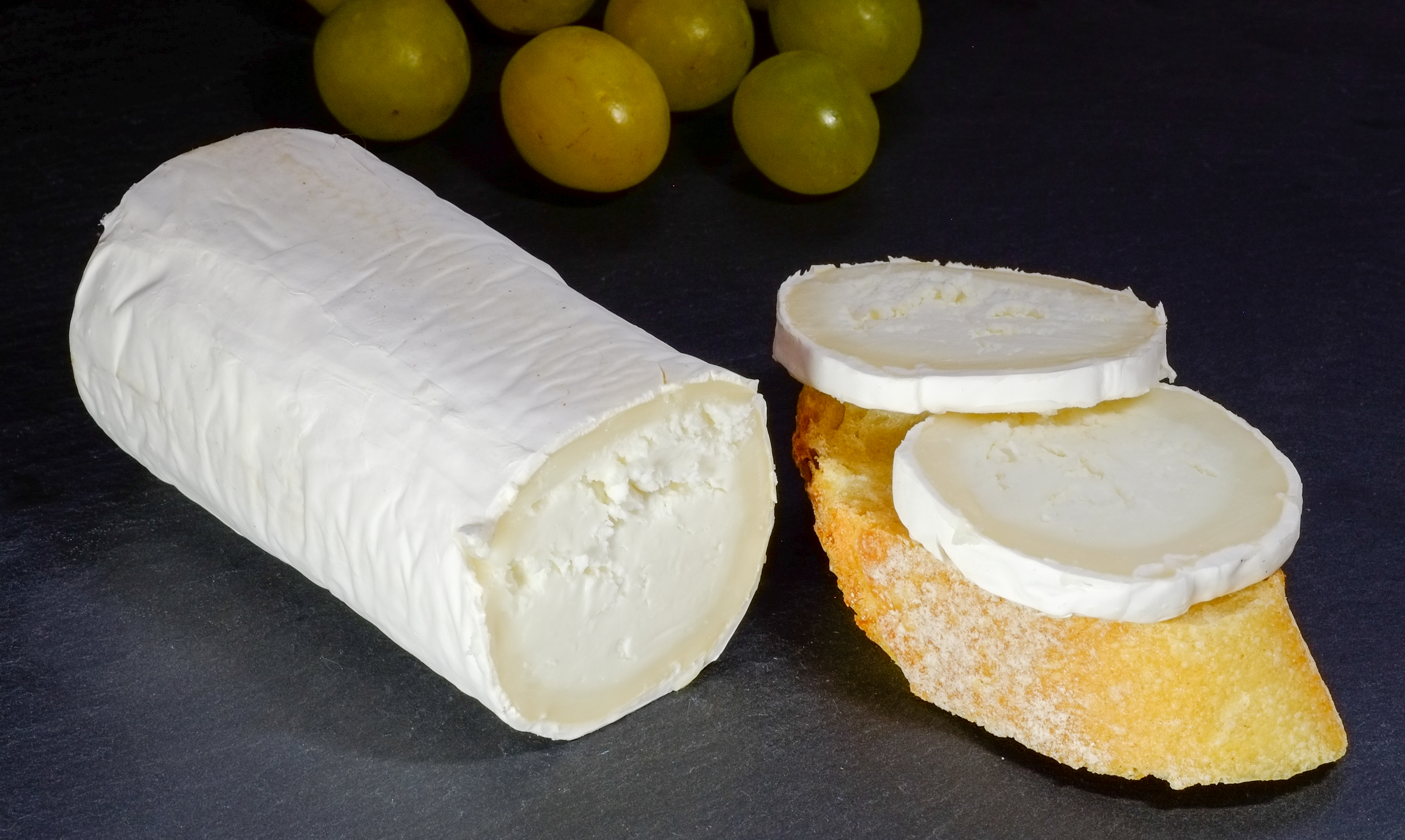
Goat cheese on bread

Goat cheese, goat's cheese or chèvre (/ˈʃɛv(rə)/ SHEV(-rə); from the French fromage de chèvre [fʁɔmaʒ də ʃɛvʁ] with the same meaning) is cheese made from goat's milk. Goats were among the first animals to be domesticated for producing food. Goat cheese is made around the world with a variety of recipes, giving many different styles of cheeses, from fresh and soft to aged and hard.

== Properties ==
=== History ===
Goats produce high-quality, nutrient-rich milk under even the most rugged environments, making them valuable to arid or mountainous areas where cattle and sheep cannot survive. In addition, like all animal products, goat milk is heavily influenced by what the goats are eating. Because goats have resilient digestive systems, they tend to eat many bitter plants that more delicate animals such as cows and horses will not. Goats were one of the earliest animals domesticated to suit human needs—more specifically milk production—going back to 8,000 BC, 10,000 years ago. Goat cheese has been made at least as far back as 5,000 BC; the first documented proof of humans making cheese of any kind dates to 7,500 years ago in Poland.

=== Nutritional value ===
Goat milk has higher proportions of medium-chain fatty acids, such as caproic and caprylic, which contribute to the characteristic tart/"goat" flavor of the cheese. These fatty acids take their name from the Latin for 'goat', capra. They also make goat milk and cheeses more easily digestible.

Goat milk, and therefore goat cheeses, contain anti-inflammatory enzymes, probiotics, antioxidants, proteins, and lipids and help maintain a healthy metabolism. They are also high in calcium, vitamins A and K, phosphorus, thiamin, and niacin. Overall, the consumption of 60 grams (2.1 oz) per day of cheese (both control and enriched), within the context of a balanced hypocaloric diet and recommendations for physical activity, was effective for the reduction of body weight, body mass index and waist circumference.

=== Process ===
Goat cheese is made like other cheeses. The milk is filtered to remove unwanted impurities or deposits. A curdling starter agent is added, which can be rennet, or one or more starter bacteria that affect the curds' size and eventually the cheese's consistency. Some examples of starters are Lactococcus lactis lactis, L. l. cremoris, and Streptococcus thermophilus. Next, the cheese is molded and separated from the whey (the uncurdled liquid part of the milk). The curds are then molded, dried, flavored, and cured. Any variations in this process—the type of starter, the time or pressure of the draining, the temperature and duration of the curing process—can change the texture (soft, semihard, hard) and the flavor.

== Regional varieties ==
=== Asia ===
==== China ====
- Rubing is a fresh goat cheese from Yunnan Province, resembling the Indian paneer, a cow's cheese.
- Shosha is a pungent cheese and staple food in Tibetan cuisine of the Tibet Autonomous Region that is often made from animals suited to the climate, such as goat and yak.

==== Japan ====
- Yagi cheese is a goat cheese made in Japan. Yagi is the Japanese word for goat.

==== Philippines ====
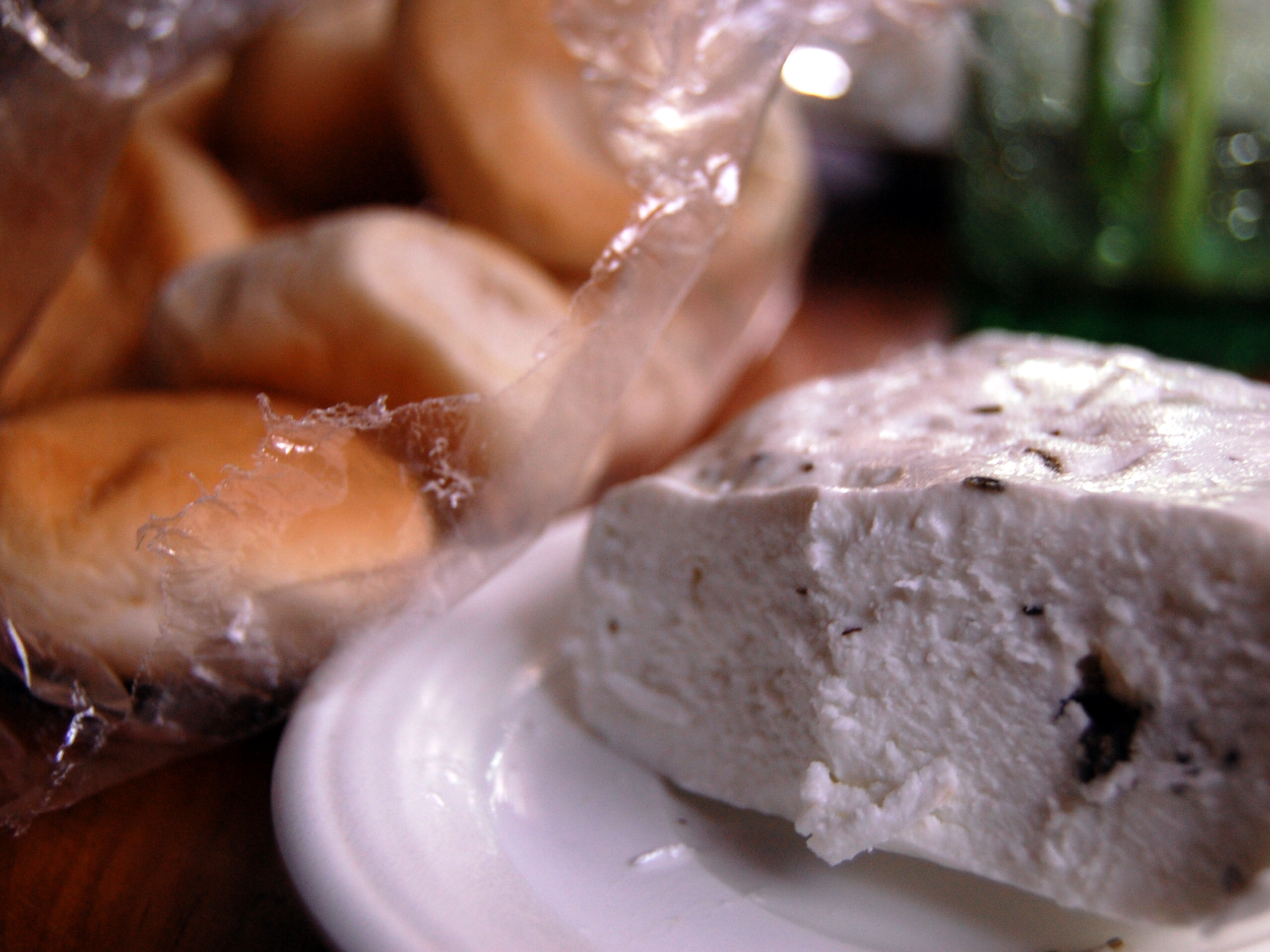
Kesong puti cheese: Moisture content can also vary, ranging from almost gelatinous to pressed and firm. It can be eaten as is, paired with bread (usually pandesal), or used in various dishes in Filipino cuisine.

- Kesong puti is a Filipino soft, unaged, white cheese made from unskimmed carabao milk and salt curdled with vinegar, citrus juices, or sometimes rennet. It can also be made with goat or cow milk. It has a mild salty and tart flavor. When an acidifying agent is used, it resembles queso blanco or paneer. When rennet is used, it resembles buffalo mozzarella. The name, also spelled quesong puti, is Tagalog for "white cheese") and is its name in the provinces of Laguna and Bulacan. In Cavite, it is known as kesilyo (also kasilyo or quesillo); while in northern Cebu, it is known as queseo or kiseyo.

==== Western Asia ====
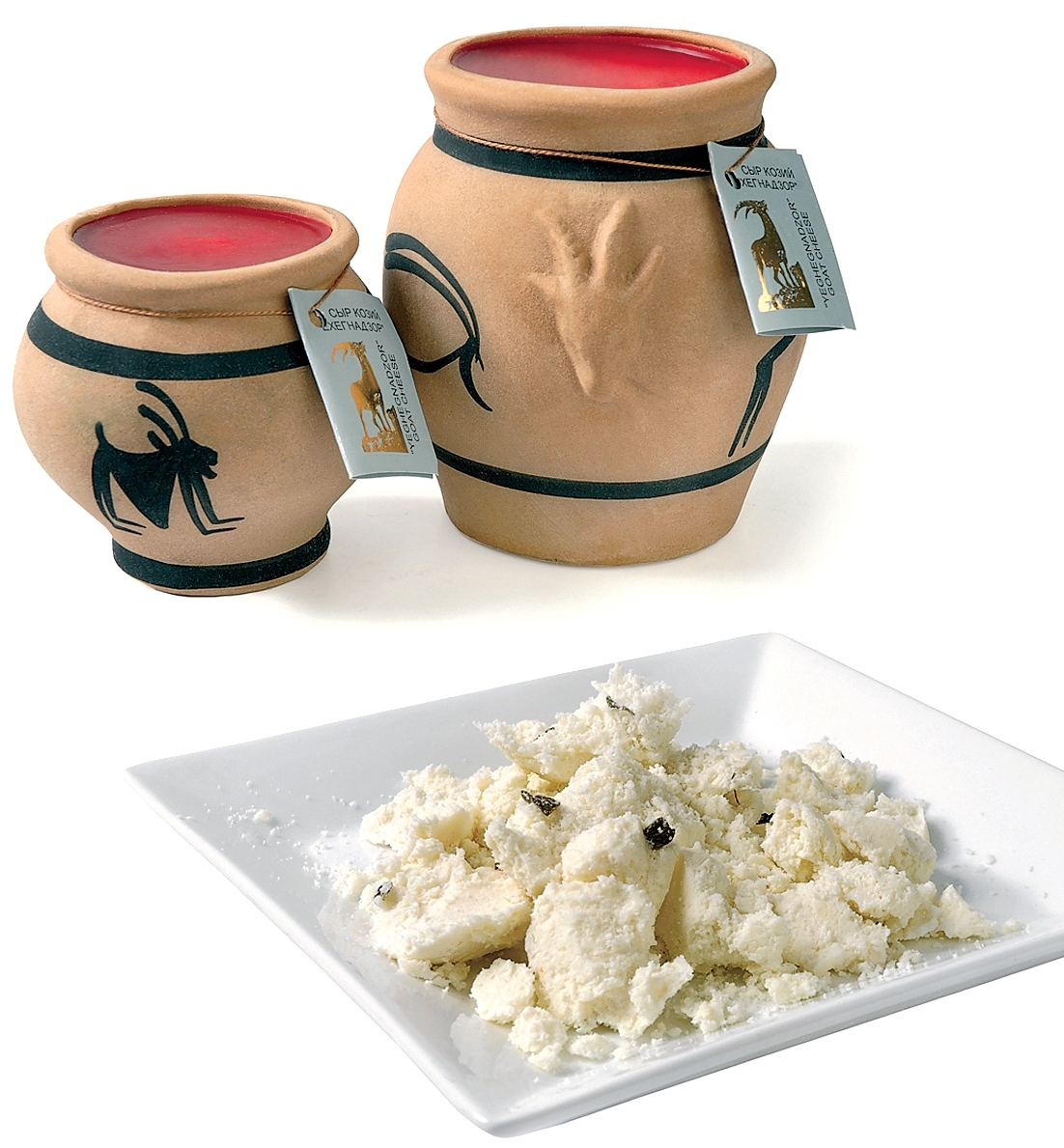
Goat cheese from Yeghegnadzor, Armenia

- Yeghegnadzor goat cheese from Armenia.
- Akkawi cheese (Arabic: جبنة عكاوي, romanized: jubna ʿakkāwī, also Akawi, Akawieh and Ackawi) is a white brine cheese named after the city of Akka (Acre, present-day Israel).
- Darfyieh is a flavorful cheese that comes specifically from baladi goats and is treated as a delicacy in Dargyieh.
- Djamid or Jameed is an unripened, hard cheese with a salt encrusted rind popular in Jordan and Syria.
- Jibneh Arabieh (Arabic: جبنة عربية) (also jibni) is a soft white cheese found all over the Middle East. It is particularly popular in the Persian Gulf region. The cheese has a mild taste similar to feta but less salty. The heritage of the product started with Bedouins using goat or sheep milk; however, current practice is to use cow's milk to make the cheese. Jibneh Arabieh is used for cooking, or simply as a table cheese.
- Labneh is consumed in many parts of the world. It is primarily produced in Egypt, Israel, Lebanon, Syria, Palestine and Jordan but also throughout much of the Middle-east. It can be served with olive-oil, or seasoned with mint, eaten with salad or as dessert.
- Nabulsi cheese Nabulsi or naboulsi is one of a number of Palestinian white brined cheeses made in the Middle East and Palestine. Its name refers to its place of origin, Nablus and it is well known throughout the West Bank and surrounding regions. Nabulsi, along with Akkawi cheese, is one of the principal cheeses consumed in Jordan. It is produced primarily from sheep milk; alternatively, goat's milk may be used.
- Circassian cheese (Adyghe: адыгэ къуае Adyghe pronunciation: [aːdəɣa qʷaːja], Russian: адыгейский сыр adygeyskiy syr, is a cheese found across the North Caucasus, the Levant and other areas with a Circassian diaspora. The cheese is prepared with raw cow, sheep and/or goats milk (Adyghean cheese - only with cow milk) and molded into a wooden basket.
- Circassian smoked cheese is a smoked low-fat Circassian cheese, especially produced in the eastern Marmara region of Turkey. It is light yellow or cream-colored with a thick crust. After curdling and straining, the bottom and top of the cheese are salted and it is smoked with pinewood or thick pitch pine in smoking rooms. This process makes the cheese both more flavorful and more long-lasting.

=== Europe ===
==== Balkans ====
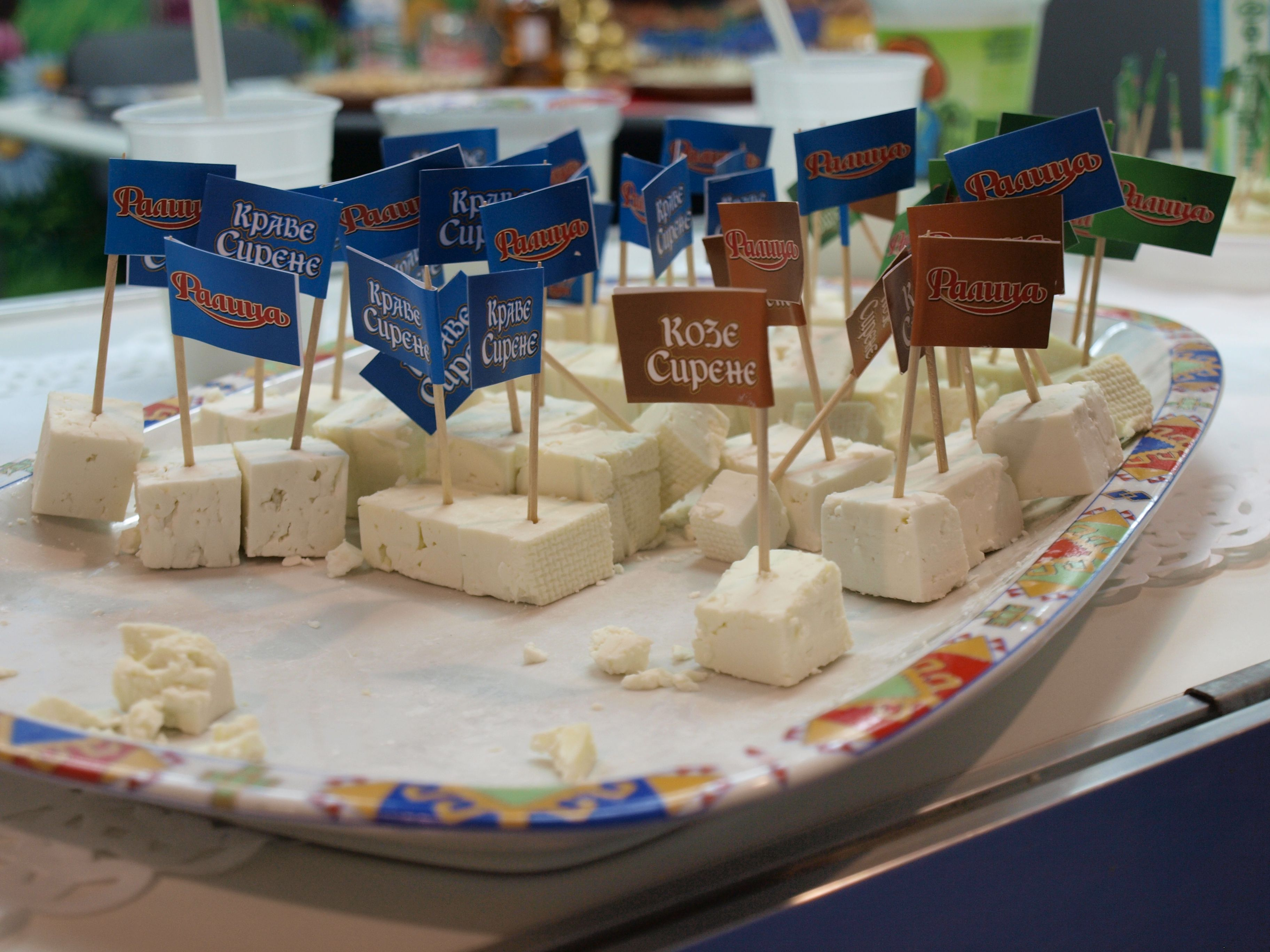
Sirene cheese

- Sirene cheese (Albanian: djathë i bardhë; Bulgarian: сирене [ˈsirɛnɛ]; Macedonian: сирење; Serbian: сир/sir) also known as "white brine sirene" (Bulgarian: бяло саламурено сирене) is a type of brined cheese made in the Balkans (South-Eastern Europe), especially popular in Bulgaria, Serbia, Montenegro, Bosnia and Herzegovina, North Macedonia, Romania, Albania, Greece and also in Israel and Lebanon. It is made of the milk of goats, sheep, or cows, or a mixture of these.

==== Cyprus ====
- Anari (Greek: αναρή, Turkish: nor) is a fresh mild whey cheese produced in Cyprus. Although much less known than other Cypriot cheeses (e.g. halloumi), it gained popularity following publicity.
- Halloumi or haloumi (/həˈluːmi/, Greek: χαλούμι, romanized: haloúmi) is a traditional Cypriot cheese made from a mixture of goat's and sheep's milk, and sometimes also cow's milk.

==== Denmark ====
- Rosa mundo.
  - Fenna mundo, Flora mundo, Geta mundo, Vita mundo.
- Cumulu blue.

There are many different goat cheeses made in Denmark.

==== Finland ====
- Leipäjuusto (bread cheese) or juustoleipä (Meänkieli: kahvijuusto; Swedish: kaffeost or brödost), also known in the United States as Finnish squeaky cheese, is a Finnish fresh cheese traditionally made from cow's beestings, rich milk from a cow that has recently calved. Reindeer or even goat milk can also be used. Commercially available versions are typically made from cow's milk, and they lack some of the colour and flavour because of this. The cheese originally comes from Southern Ostrobothnia, Northern Finland, and Kainuu.

==== France ====
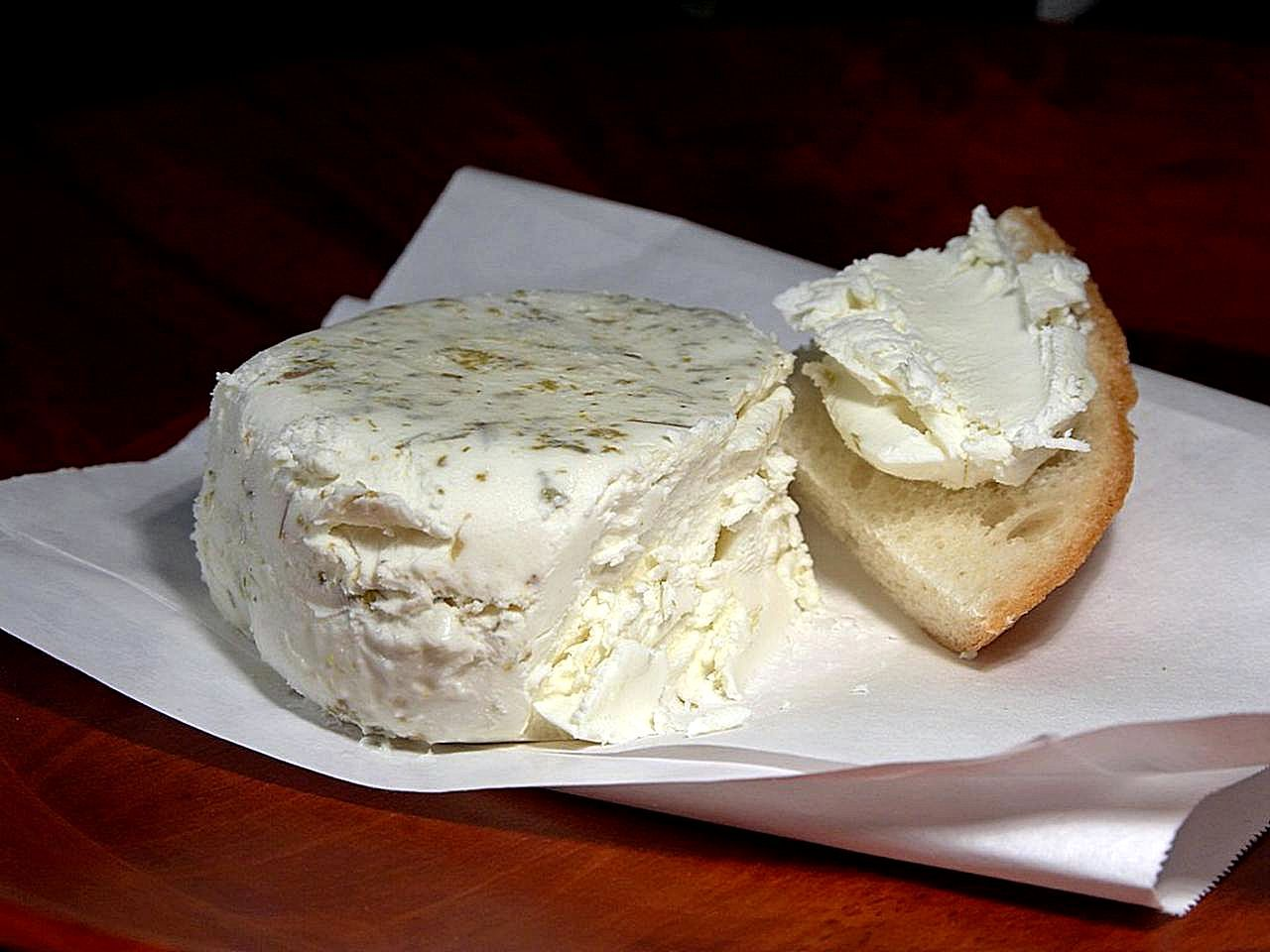
Chevre with lavender and wild fennel

France produces a great number of goat milk cheeses, especially in the Loire Valley and Poitou.

- Chevre is a soft, creamy, melt-in-mouth cheese that can have a fruity taste to it. It is usually covered in a light colored rind or skin. It is not aged for very long. It is sometimes served hot as chèvre chaud.
  - Banon cheese, Bucheron, Cabécou, Cathare, Chabis, Chaubier, Chavroux, Chabichou, Chevrotin, Clochette, Couronne Lochoise, Crottin de Chavignol, Faisselle, Montrachet (Burgundy), Montrachet Bourgogne, Pélardon, Picodon, Pouligny Saint-Pierre, Pouligny-Saint-Pierre cheese, Rigotte de Condrieu, Rocamadour, Sainte-Maure de Touraine, Selles-sur-Cher cheese, Chabichou du Poitou, Valençay, and Pyramide.

==== Greece ====
- Feta is made primarily of ewe's milk, with up to 30% of goat milk. Sheep (≥70%) and goat per PDO; similar cheeses may contain cow or buffalo milk.
- Mizithra or myzithra is a whey cheese which can be produced from the whey left over from goat cheeses. It is served either fresh or dried.
- Anthotyros (Greek: Ανθότυρος) or (Anthotyro in modern Greek, "flowery cheese") is a traditional fresh cheese is a whey cheese using the whey from Kefalotyri or Graviera production and can be made from milk from goats, sheep or a combination. There are dry Anthotyros and fresh Anthotyros. Dry Anthotyros is a matured cheese similar to Mizithra. Anthotyros is made with milk and whey milk. It is served fresh or dried. Anthotyros is produced in Greece, commonly in Thrace, Macedonia, the Ionian Islands and Crete.
- Manouri (Greek: μανούρι) is a Greek semi-soft, fresh white mixed milk-whey cheese made from goat or sheep milk. It is produced primarily in Thessalia and Macedonia in central and northern Greece.
- Formaela (Greek: Φορμαέλα) is a hard cheese produced exclusively in Arachova, Greece. It is famous throughout Greece and has been registered in the European Union as a protected designation of origin since 1996. Formaela is prepared mainly from sheep's milk or goat's milk, has a hard and cohesive shell and is a light yellow color, without holes.
- Kasseri or Kaşar (Greek: κασέρι, Turkish: kaşar is a medium-hard or hard pale yellow cheese made from pasteurised or unpasteurised sheep milk and at most 20% goat's milk. Kasseri is of semi-hard to hard consistency, smooth rather than crumbly, chewy, and with a hard rind. It belongs to the pasta filata family of cheeses, which includes fresh cheeses like mozzarella and aged ones like Provolone or Caciocavallo. Kasseri is a protected designation of origin, according to which the cheese must be made in the Greek provinces of Thessaly, Macedonia, Lesbos, or Xanthi, but a similar type of cheese is found in Turkey, Romania, and the Balkans, where it is known as kashkaval. The same cheese is made with cow's milk, but in that case it cannot be legally sold as kasseri in the EU and is instead sold under names that are particular to each producer.
- Kefalotyri or kefalotiri (Greek: κεφαλοτύρι, Turkish: talar peyniri) is a hard, salty white cheese made from sheep milk or goat's milk (or both) in Greece and Cyprus. A similar cheese Kefalograviera, also made from sheep or goat milk (or both), is sometimes sold outside Greece and Cyprus as Kefalotyri. Depending on the mixture of milk used in the process the color can vary between yellow and white.
- Xynomizithra or xynomyzithra (Greek: Ξινομυζήθρα) is a Greek whey cheese with some added milk; it is a sour variant of Mizithra, and made from ewes' and/or goats' milk. The proportion of full-cream milk is about 15%.
- Xynotyro or Xynotyri is an unpasteurized whey cheese from Greece made from sheep's milk or goat's milk, with a hard and flaky consistency, a pungent aroma and a yogurt-like sweet and sour taste. "Xynotyri" means "sour cheese" in Greek. Traditionally, the cheese is drained and cured in reed baskets or allowed to mature in bags made of animal skin. Cow's milk is not utilized in the production.

==== Ireland ====
- Ardagh Castle.
- Ardsallagh Goat Farm a lot of different Irish cheese.
- Clonmore Cheese.
- Cooleeney Farmhouse Cheese.
- Corleggy Cheese.
- Gleann Gabhra.
- Glyde Farm Produce Irish cheese.
- St Tola.
- Tullyboy.

==== Italy ====
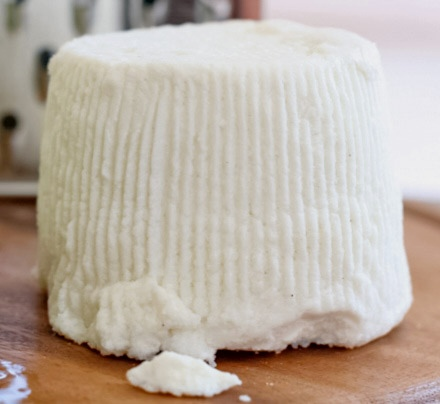
Ricotta cheese

- Caprino is a term encompassing at least 33 different goat milk cheeses produced in Italy, equivalent to the French chèvre
- Acidino (tr. slightly acid), produced in Veneto
- Agrì di Valtorta, produced in Lombardy
- Formaggio di capra di Lagundo (or Algunder Ziegenkäse), produced in South Tyrol
- Canestrato di Moliterno Stagionato in Fondaco, produced mixing sheep and goat milk in Apulia and Basilicata
- Casu axedu (also called Frughe, Frue or Merca) produced in Sardinia
- Cavrin (or Cevrin) di Coazze, produced in Piedmont
- Ircano, produced in Sardinia
- Salignon, a smoked cheese produced in the lower Aosta Valley
- Mozzarella made of Italian Mediterranean buffalo traditionally; cattle cows in all 167 Italian regions; in some areas also sheep and goat
- Ricotta is produced from the whey that from cheesemaking and whey cheese made from sheep, cow, goat, or Italian water buffalo milk whey left over from the production of other cheeses. Ricotta means 're-cooked', and is made by reheating the whey, until the clotted cheese curds rise to the top, where they are skimmed and molded.
- Robiola is an Italian soft-ripened cheese of the Stracchino family. It is from the Langhe region and made with varying proportions of cow's, goat's, and sheep's milk. One theory is that the cheese gets its name from the town of Robbio in the province of Pavia; another that the name comes from the word rubeole (ruddy) because of the color of the seasoned rind. Varieties of Robiola are produced across Piedmont from the provinces of Cuneo, Asti and Alessandria and into Lombardy. It is one of the specialties of the Aosta Valley.
- Caciotta, from the Tuscan cacciola, is a type of cheese produced in Italy from the milk of cows, sheep, goats, or water buffalo. Cacciotta has more than a dozen variations.
  - Caciotta marchigiana.
- Bastardo del Grappa is a traditional cheese produced in the foothills of Monte Grappa massif and in the provinces of Treviso, Belluno, and Vicenza, in Italy. Bastardo del Grappa is a product related genuinely to the area of Monte Grappa massif and around Borso del Grappa, Crespano del Grappa, Paderno del Grappa, Possagno, Cavaso del Tomba, Alano di Piave, Quero, Feltre, Seren del Grappa, Arsiè, Cismon del Grappa, San Nazario, Solan, Pove del Grappa, and Romano d'Ezzelino.

==== Malta ====
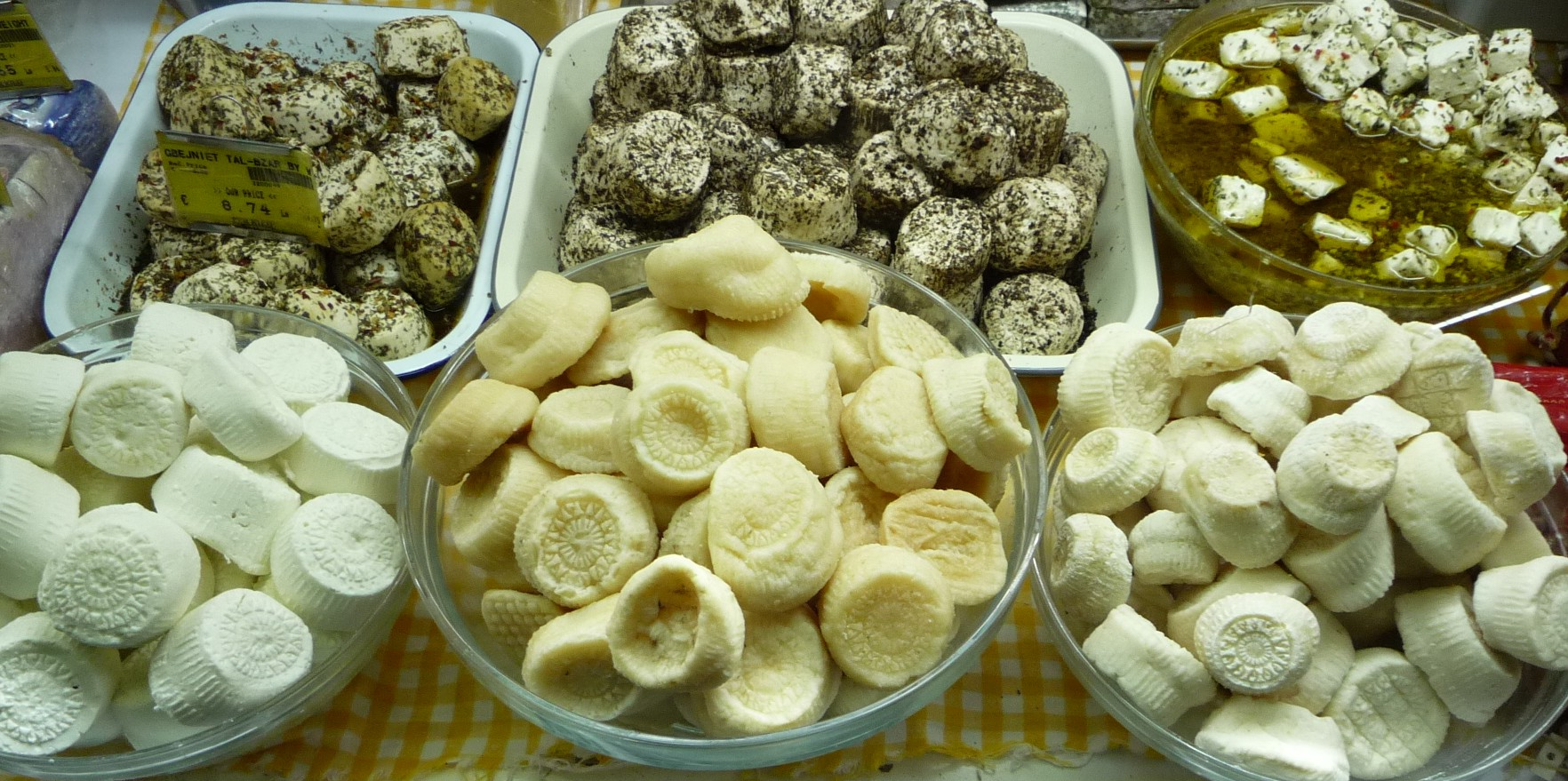
A selection of fresh and cured ġbejniet

- A ġbejna is a small goat's- or sheep's-milk cheese. Various types are found which include; fresh (friski or tal-ilma), sundried (moxxa, bajda or ta' Għawdex), salt cured (maħsula), peppered (tal-bżar) and seasoned (imħawra).
  - Gbejna friska - a fresh cheeselet similar to ricotta in texture - native to Maltese Islands.
  - Gbejna tal bzar - same as above but aged and coated in black pepper - native to Maltese Islands.
  - Gbejna mghoxxa - same as the fresh cheeslet but left to air dry - native to Maltese Islands.

==== Netherlands ====
- The Westerkwartier, the region west of the city of Groningen, has a relatively large concentration of organic goat-cheese farms. Well known goat cheeses from this region are Machedoux and Quiorio, brie-like cheeses served in restaurants all over the Netherlands and in Belgium and northern Germany. In other parts of the Netherlands, goat cheese is usually made in the Gouda style.

==== Norway ====
- Geitost, which means goat cheese, is brown and made from goat milk and whey. Other brown cheeses, such as Brunost ("Brown cheese"), may also be made from cow milk whey, goat milk whey or a combination.
- Snøfrisk is a fresh goat milk cheese, often made with added flavorings.

==== Portugal ====
- Castelo Branco is a Portuguese goat milk cheese. Castelo Branco (Portuguese: Queijo de Castelo Branco) is a cheese named after the city of the same name in Portugal, the main city of the district where it is produced. Since 1996 Castelo Branco cheese has had a Protected designation of origin (PDO), being one of the three Beira Baixa cheeses (PDO) (Portuguese: Queijos da Beira Baixa DOP). The cheese is made from goat or sheep milk, and has a soft texture. Typically, the cheese takes 40 days to mature when made with goat's milk, and 50 days when made with ewe's milk. The fat content is around 45% and the cheese is usually a close-to-white colour.
- Trás-os-Montes, (Portuguese: Queijo de Cabra Transmontano) is a goat milk cheese from Alto Trás-os-Montes, Norte Region, Portugal.
- Santarém cheese is a goat cheese from Portugal produced in several different regions, most notably in the Santarém district and in Serra de Santo António in the Ribatejo province of Portugal.

==== Russia ====
- Adygeisky cheese is made from sheep's, goat's, or cow's whole milk.

==== Serbia ====
- Pule cheese or magareći sir, is a Serbian cheese made from 60% Balkan donkey milk and 40% goat milk.

==== Spain ====
- Mató is a Catalan fresh cheese made from cow's or goat's milk.
- Garrotxa is a firm goat cheese originally from Garrotxa in northern Catalonia.
- Nevat, a soft-ripened goat cheese from Catalonia.
- Cabrales cheese (Spanish: Queso de Cabrales) is a blue cheese made in the artisan tradition by rural dairy farmers in Asturias, Spain. This cheese can be made from pure, unpasteurized cow's milk or blended in the traditional manner with goat and/or sheep milk, which lends the cheese a stronger, spicier flavor. All of the milk used in the production of Cabrales must come exclusively from herds raised in a small zone of production in Asturias, in the mountains of the Picos de Europa.
- Majorero cheese is a goat milk cheese from the Canary Island of Fuerteventura.
- Payoyo cheese (Spanish: queso payoyo or queso de cabra payoya) is a type of cheese made from the milk of Payoya goats and Merina grazalemeña sheep in Villaluenga del Rosario and other areas of the Sierra de Grazalema, Spain. It began production in 1997 and has become a staple of Spanish delicatessen.
- Picón Bejes-Tresviso is a blue cheese from Cantabria, in the north of Spain. It has been protected under Denominación de Origen (DO) legislation since 1994, prior to which it was traditionally known as Picón de Tresviso and Queso Picón de Bejes. The designated area centers in the Liébana valley and production is restricted to the municipalities of Potes, Pesaguero, Cabezón de Liébana, Camaleño, Cillorigo de Liébana, Peñarrubia, Tresviso and Vega de Liébana.

==== Turkey ====
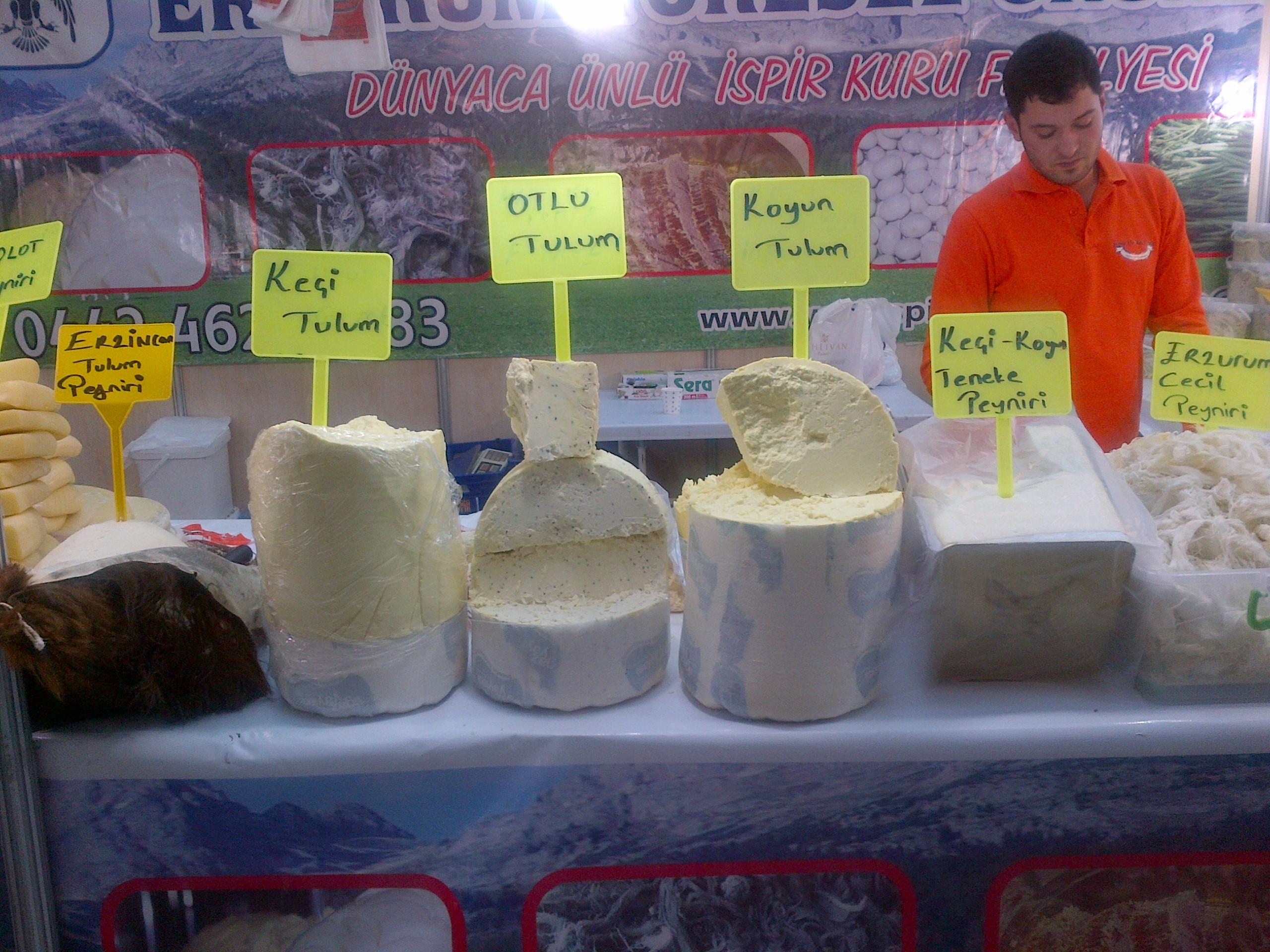
Varieties of tulum, center "Otlu tulum peyniri", or Tulum with herbs, in Ankara

- Tulum cheese is a goat cheese made in Turkey. (Turkish: tulum peyniri) is a traditional Turkish goat cheese ripened in a goatskin casing, called tulum in Turkish. Due to its unique flavor, it is preferred as meze to rakı in Turkey.
- Sepet cheese and Kaşar cheese are produced from goat milk and marketed as Goat Sepet cheese and Goat Kaşar cheese.
- Sutdiyari 'white cheese' is a cheese produced from sheep, cow, or goat milk.
- Beyaz peynir 'white cheese' is a brined cheese produced from sheep, cow, or goat milk.
  - Ezine Cheese, originating from Ezine, Çanakkale, is a type of Beyaz Peynir including at least 40% goat milk according to the geographical protection rules.
- Dolaz cheese is a traditional cheese produced from whey by nomad (Karakoyunlu, Hayta, Honamlı, Sarıkeçili Yörüks) in the Lakes region (Isparta, Afyon and Antalya) in Turkey. It is generally made from ewe's and goat's milk.
- Kars gravyer cheese is a Turkish cheese similar to Gruyère. It is usually made with pure cow's milk or a mixture of cow and goat's milk.
- Van herbed cheese (Turkish: Van otlu peyniri) is a type of cheese made out of sheep's or cow's milk. Ripened cheese varieties containing herbs are traditional in Turkey and have been manufactured for more than 200 years in the east and southeast of the country.

==== Ukraine ====
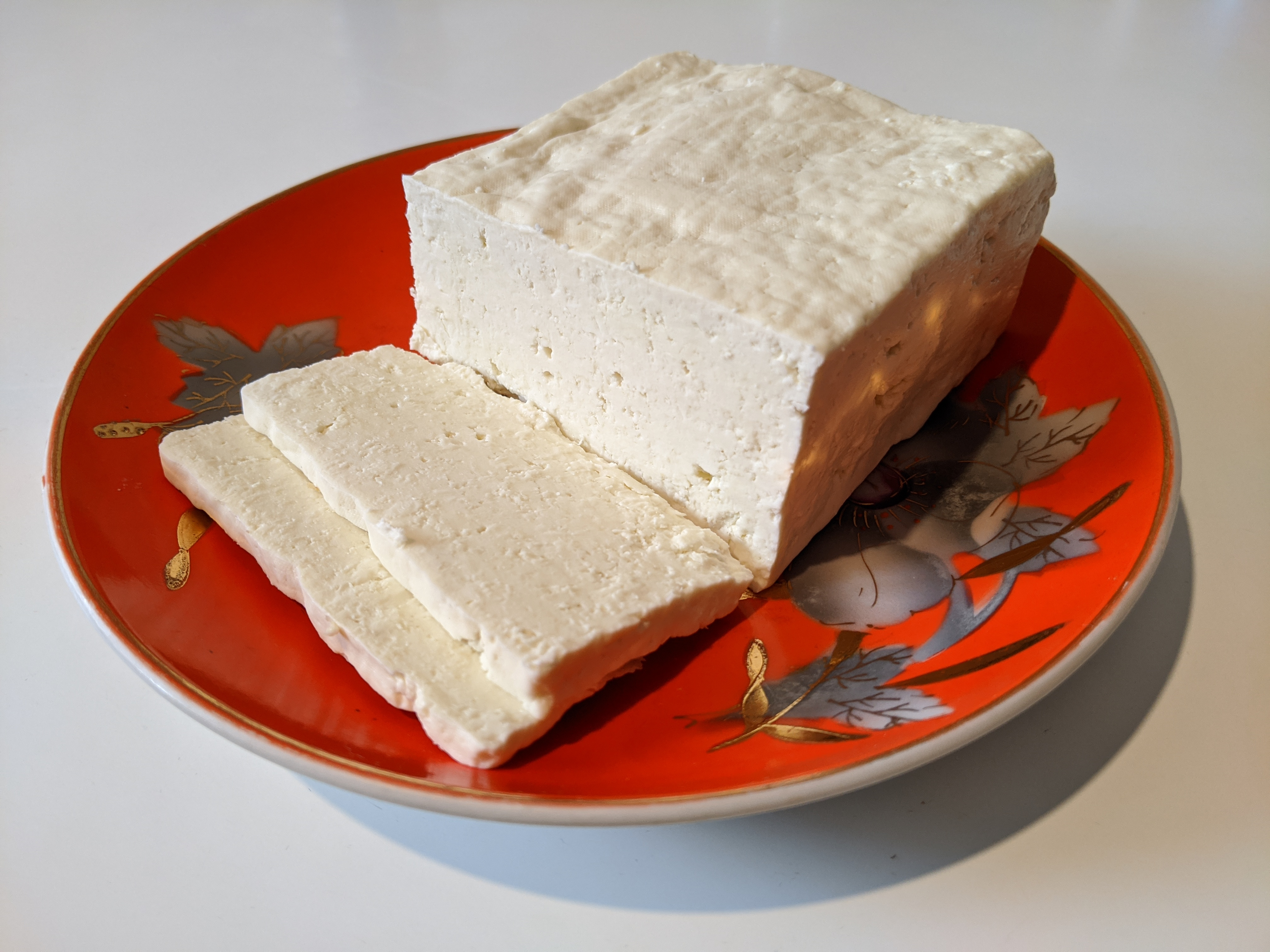
Bryndza cheese

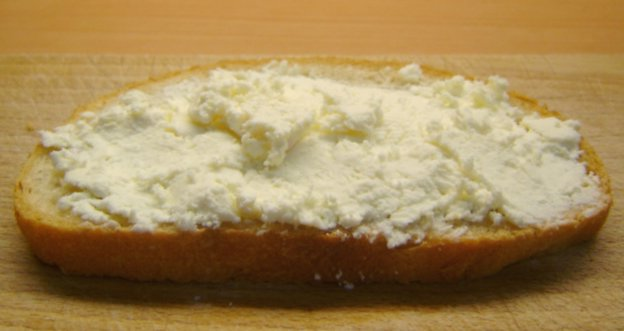
Bryndza cheese on a piece of bread

- Bryndza (from Romanian brânză – cheese) is a sheep milk cheese made across much of East-Central Europe, primarily in or around the Carpathian Mountains of Slovakia, Ukraine, Romania and southern Poland. Bryndza cheese is creamy white in appearance, known for its characteristic strong smell and taste. The cheese is white, tangy, crumbly and slightly moist. It has characteristic odor and flavor with a notable taste of butyric acid. The overall flavor sensation begins slightly mild, then goes strong and finally fades to a salty finish. Recipes differ slightly across countries. This cheese can also be made with goat milk or cow milk.

==== United Kingdom ====
- Harbourne Blue.
- Pantysgawn is a Welsh goat milk cheese.
- Capricorn is a Somerset goat milk cheese.
- Gevrik is a goat's milk cheese from Cornwall. The word gevrik means 'little goat' in Cornish.
- Tesyn is a smoked goat's milk cheese from Cornwall. Tesyn means 'cake' in Cornish.

=== Americas ===
==== Canada ====
- Bouq Émissaire.
- Chèvre noir.

==== Mexico ====
- Añejo cheese (Queso Añejo).
- Asadero cheese.
- Cotija cheese.
- Fresco cheese (Queso Fresco).
- Manchego cheese.
- Quesillo Oaxaca cheese.

==== United States ====
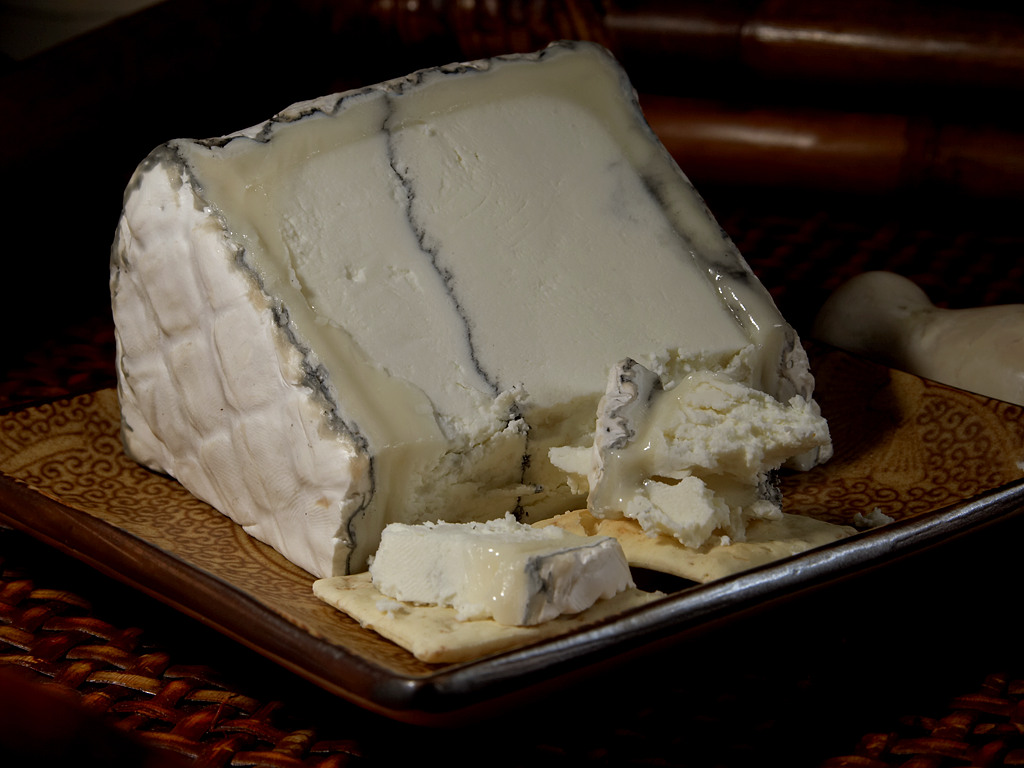
Humboldt Fog

- Capricious is an aged goat's milk cheese made by the Achadinha Cheese Company in Petaluma, California.
- Humboldt Fog is a mold-ripened goat cheese with a central line of edible white ash made in California by Cypress Grove Chevre.
- Kunik is produced at Nettle Meadow Goat Farm in Thurman, New York, and made from goat and Jersey cow milk blend, mold-ripened with similar properties to Brie.

==== Venezuela ====
- In Venezuela, specifically in the states of Falcón, Lara and the population of San Jose de Turgua in Miranda state, many types of goat cheese are produced using traditional methods. A variety of artisanal cheeses are manufactured by smaller producers.

=== Australian and Oceanian ===
==== Australia ====
- Buche Noir is freshly pressed curd from the Sydney region.

=== Africa ===
==== Egypt ====
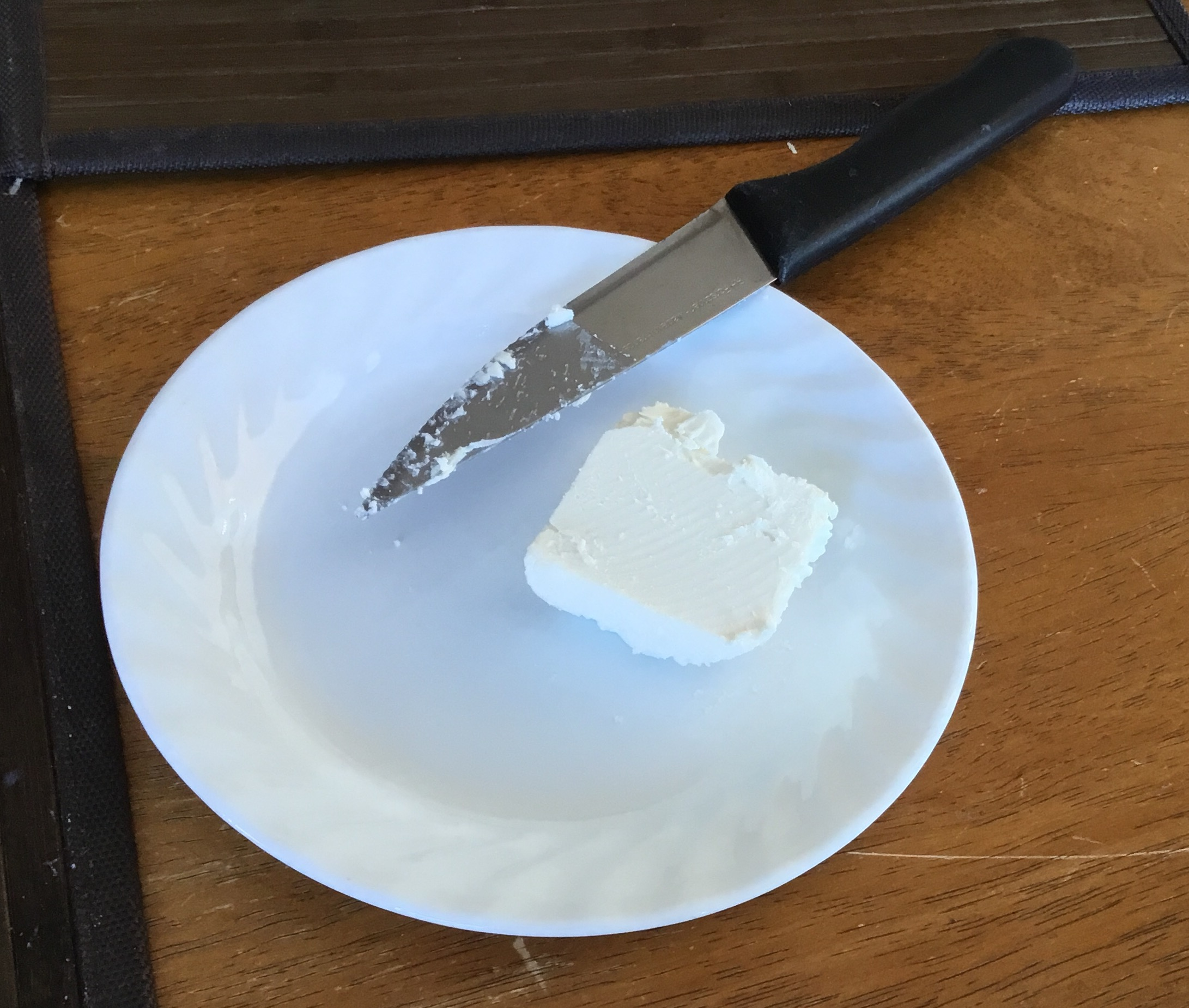
Domiati cheese

- Domiati cheese, also referred to as white cheese (Egyptian Arabic: جبنة بيضا gebna bēḍa [ˈɡebnæ ˈbeːdɑ]), is a soft white salty cheese made primarily in Egypt, but also in Sudan and other Middle Eastern countries. Typically made from buffalo milk, cow milk, or a mixture, it can also be made from other milks, such as sheep, goat or camel milk. It is the most common Egyptian cheese. Unlike feta and other white cheeses, salt is added directly to the milk, before rennet is added. It is named after the seaport city of Damietta (دمياط).
- Testouri cheese is a cheese made from sheep milk or goat milk. It is often shaped like an orange, and is eaten fresh and lightly salted. Testouri cheese is popular in North Africa and the Near East. Testouri is popular in East Africa and was introduced by the Ottomans after the 15th century.

==== South Africa ====
- Bettie Bok an African cheese from South Africa.
- Assegai is an Asiago-type cheese from South Africa. It originates from Foxenburg, South Africa. It is commonly eaten as a table cheese with crackers.

== See also ==
- List of goat milk cheeses
- List of cheeses
- List of goat dishes
- White cheese
