= Grappa (disambiguation) =

Grappa is an Italian alcoholic beverage. Grappa may also refer to:

== Places ==
- Bassano del Grappa, a city and comune in the Veneto region of northern Italy
- Monte Grappa, a mountain in the Veneto region of Italy
  - Battle of Monte Grappa, a series of three World War I battles on Monte Grappa
- Borso del Grappa
- Cismon del Grappa
- Crespano del Grappa
- Paderno del Grappa
- Pove del Grappa
- Seren del Grappa

== Food ==
- Bastardo del Grappa, a traditional cheese
- Morlacco di Grappa, a cheese from Monte Grappa

== Other uses ==
- Grappa Music, A Norwegian music-publishing company
