= Pieve del Grappa =

- Comune
- Comune di Pieve del Grappa
- Location within Veneto Location within Italy
- Coordinates: 45°50′6″N 11°50′54″E
- Country: Italy
- Region: Veneto
- Province: Treviso (TV)
- Frazioni: Crespano del Grappa, Fietta, Paderno del Grappa

Area
  - Total: 37.34 km^{2} (14.42 sq mi)
- Elevation: 300 m (980 ft)

Population (30 November 2019)
  - Total: 6,688
  - Density: 179.1/km^{2} (463.9/sq mi)
- Demonym: pievesini
- Time zone: UTC+1 (CET)
  - Summer (DST): UTC+2 (CEST)
- Postal code: 31017
- Dialing code: 0423
- ISTAT code: 026096

Pieve del Grappa is a comune or municipality in the province of Treviso, Veneto region of Italy. It was formed on 30 January 2019 with the merger of the comunes of Crespano del Grappa and Paderno del Grappa.

The municipality contains the frazioni (subdivisions, mainly villages and hamlets) Crespano del Grappa, Fietta, Paderno del Grappa.

Pieve del Grappa borders the following municipalities in the province of Treviso: Asolo, Borso del Grappa, Castelcucco, Fonte, Possagno, and San Zenone degli Ezzelini. It also borders the municipalities of Seren del Grappa and Setteville in the province of Belluno, and Valbrenta in the province of Vicenza.

== Physical geography ==
Located at the north-western end of the province, the municipality consists of two areas: to the north the mountainous area of the Grappa massif and to the south the foothills where the inhabited centers are located. The southern area is mostly flat, although it shows a certain slope with altitudes that gradually increase moving towards the Prealps. Especially in the stretch between Fietta and Paderno, it is characterized by the presence of modest hills (the so-called "motte").

The waterways are all streams that originate from the Grappa massif and, even when they enter the plain, remain embedded in depressions. The main one is the Lastego, a tributary of the Musone: it is born near Cima Grappa, descends through the valley of San Liberale and touches the three hamlets before entering the municipality of Fonte.

== History ==
On December 17, 2018, the consultative referendum was held in which the majority of voting residents voted in favor of the merger. In Crespano, 78.3% joined the "yes" vote, although the turnout was very low (33.8%); Higher participation in Paderno (49.8%), although the merger convinced a lower percentage, 57.7%. Given the outcome of the consultation, Regional Law no. 2 of 24 January 2019 was issued Establishment of the new Municipality called "Pieve del Grappa" by merging the Municipalities of Crespano del Grappa and Paderno del Grappa of the province of Treviso, published on the BUR of the Veneto Region on 29 January 2019.

== Monuments and places of interest ==
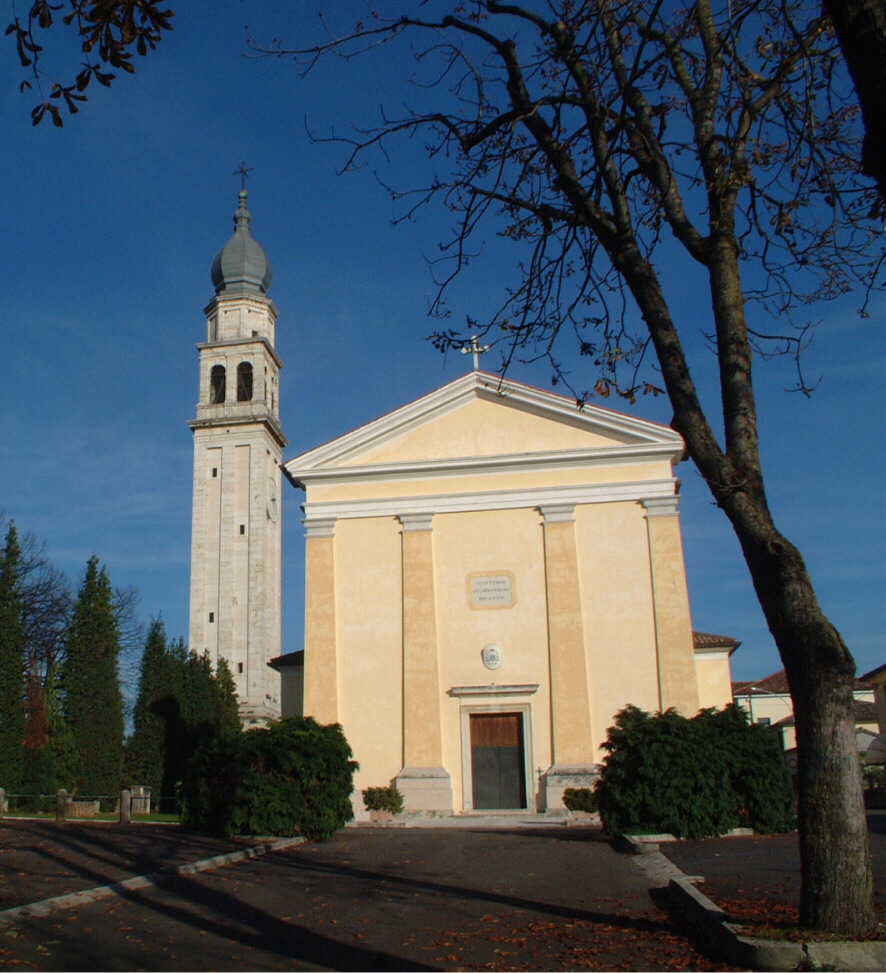
The parish church of Paderno del Grappa

=== Religious architecture ===
- Cathedral of Crespano: The cathedral of Crespano del Grappa, an imposing neoclassical building, is the seat of a vicariate of the diocese of Padua Parish
- Church of Paderno: The parish church of Paderno is dedicated to the Annunciation and dates back to the late seventeenth century.

== Demographic evolution ==
Historical population

Year	Pop.	±%
1861	?	—
1871	4,984	—
1881	5,282	+6.0%
1901	5,467	+3.5%
1911	5,676	+3.8%
1921	6,692	+17.9%

Year	Pop.	±%
1931	5,594	−16.4%
1936	5,713	+2.1%
1951	5,440	−4.8%
1961	5,090	−6.4%
1971	5,111	+0.4%
1981	5,392	+5.5%

Year	Pop.	±%
1991	5,156	−4.4%
2001	6,321	+22.6%
2011	6,873	+8.7%
2021	6,592	−4.1%

Source: Data from ISTAT

=== Foreign ethnicities and minorities ===
As of December 31, 2022, foreigners residents in the municipality were 728, i.e. 10.9% of the population. The largest groups are shown below:

1. Romania 153
2. North Macedonia 133
3. Morocco 108
4. Kosovo 58
5. Senegal 52

== Culture ==
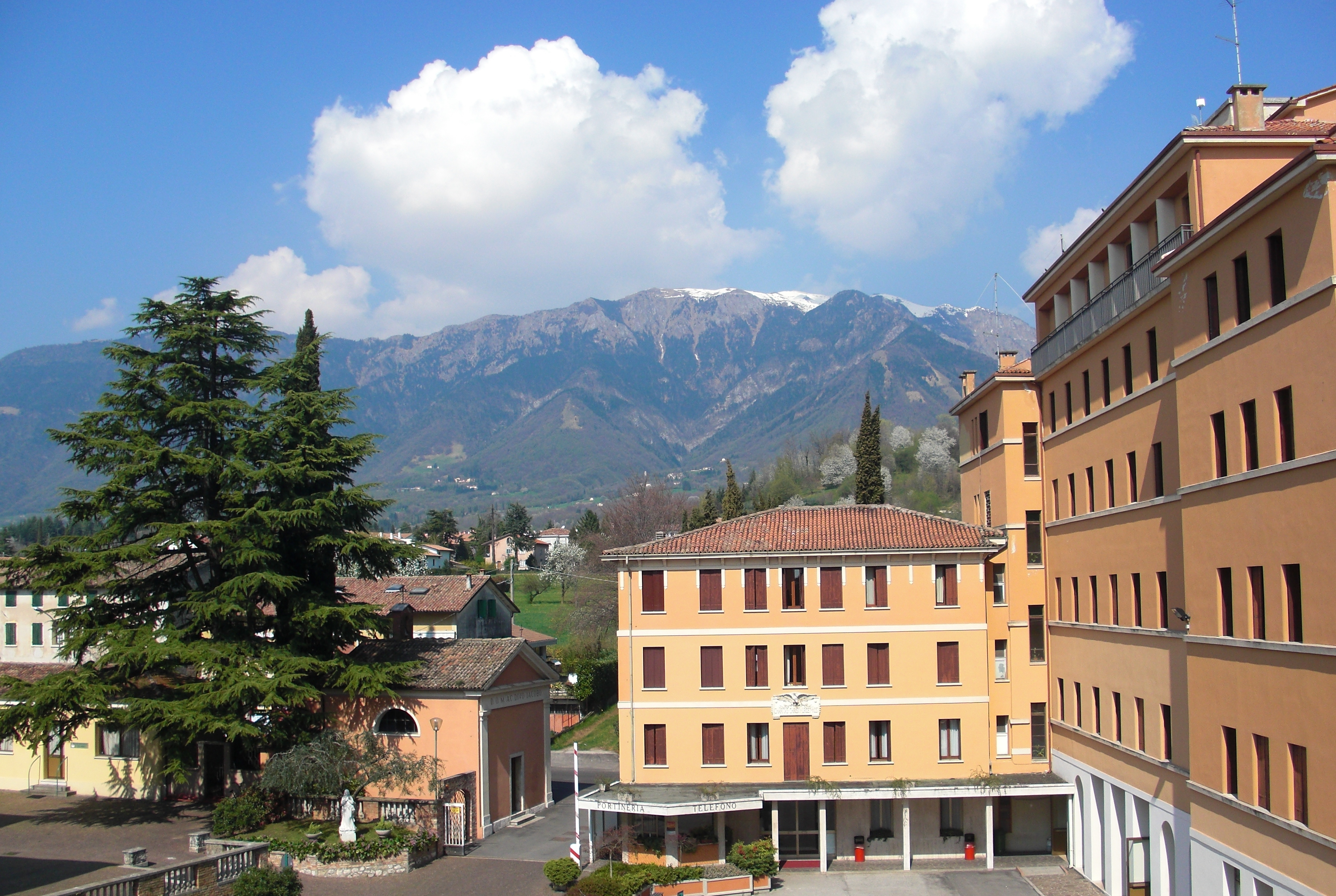
The CIMBA campus, located in Paderno del Grappa, Italy

=== Instruction ===
In the municipality there is the Filippin Institute built in 1924 in Paderno del Grappa. It is a primary, lower secondary and second grade educational institution of some international importance. Since 1958 the direction has been assumed by the Congregation of the Brothers of the Christian Schools, who have increased the educational offering.

CIMBA Italy is a study abroad program in Italy that offers study abroad and degrees for undergraduate, MBA, and Executive-level students. In 2000 CIMBA opens the Campus in Paderno del Grappa and inaugurates its first semester program for university students, starting to expand beyond economic and business subjects to offer journalism and communication courses.

=== Natural areas ===
From Via Valderoa to the Church of Sant'Andrea in Pieve del Grappa: a walk through the woods at the foot of the Grappa Massif, also passing through the Ezzelini path, to reach the Church of Sant'Andrea in the hamlet of Fietta, whose first testimonies of this place of worship date back to the year 1070. The visit can continue to the Astego Vegetation Garden a first-rate botanical park that contains the typical environments of this side of the Venetian mountains, to retrace the Grappa Massif from the summit to the slopes.

=== Religion ===
The municipality of Pieve del Grappa is divided between the dioceses of Padua and Treviso: the territory of the former municipality of Crespano del Grappa (with only the parish of Crespano) is included in the first, that of Paderno del Grappa (with the parishes of Paderno and Fietta) in the second.

== Infrastructure and transport ==
At the height of Pederobba, Feltrina road branches off the "Valcavasia" road that connects the village to Possagno and finally to Bassano del Grappa. Pieve del Grappa is connected to the center of Montebelluna by MOM bus line n.191: Montebelluna-Pederobba-Cavaso-Maser-Montebelluna.
