= Bastardo del Grappa =

Italian cheese

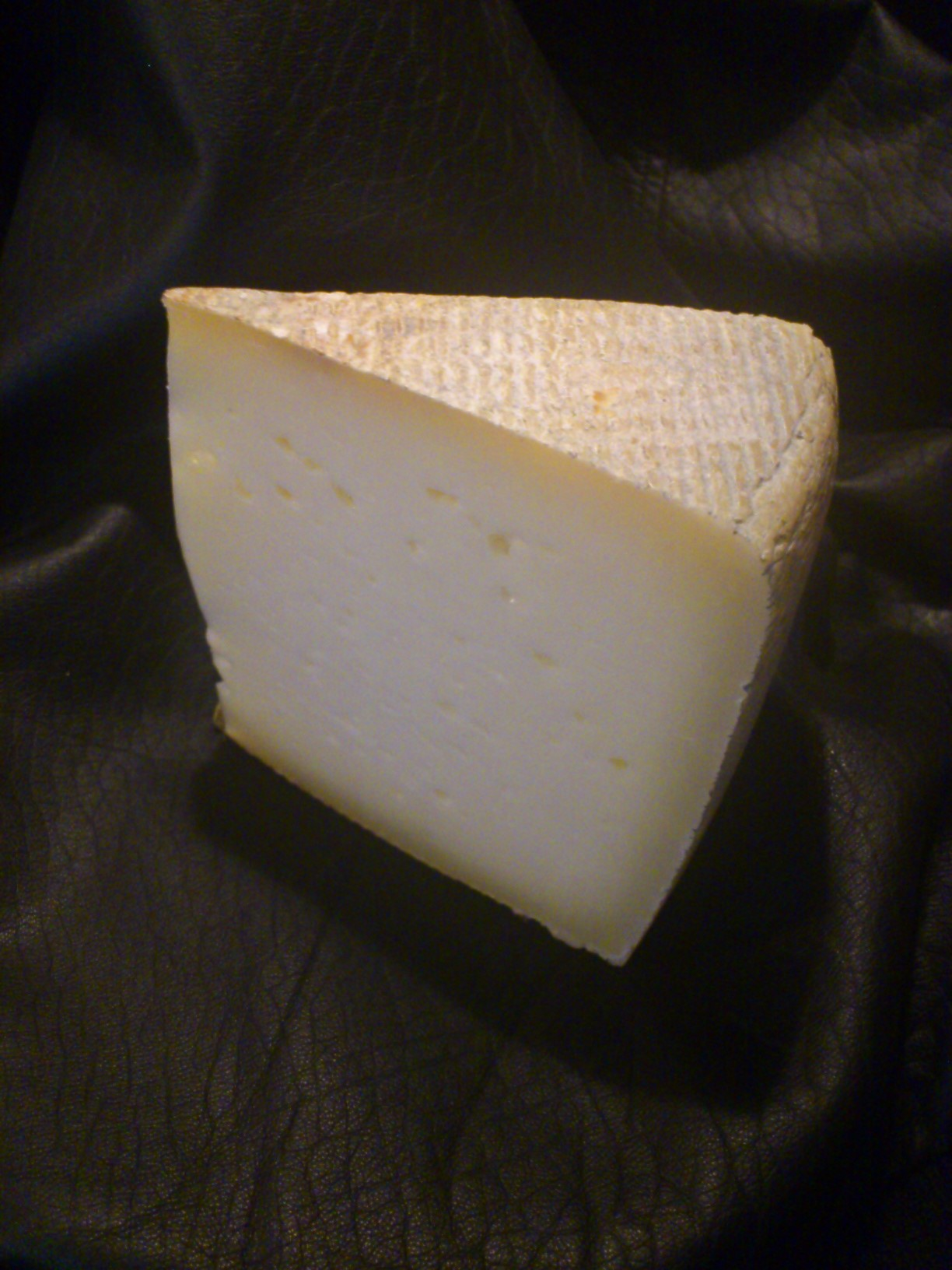
- Country of origin: Italy
- Region: Veneto
- Source of milk: Cow
- Texture: Soft and crumbly
- Fat content: 27%
- Protein content: 20%
- Dimensions: 25 to 30 cm diameter 5 to 8 cm height
- Weight: 2.5 to 5 kg
- Aging time: 25 to 120 days

Bastardo del Grappa is a traditional cheese produced in the foothills of Monte Grappa massif and in the provinces of Treviso, Belluno, and Vicenza, in Italy. Bastardo del Grappa is a certified Prodotti agroalimentari tradizionali cheese qualifying it as a genuine Italian product.

== History ==
The history of the semi-fat cheese "bastardo" dates back to 800 AD, a time in which it was produced in the pastures of the Veneto region. It is so named (bastardo means 'bastard' in Italian) because of the milk, with the addition of goat's milk in its composition, can not be turned into Morlacco cheese. Although the story also shows that the name derives from the fact that in the past it was also produced with goat, sheep and cow's milk.

== Areas of production ==
Bastardo del Grappa is a product related genuinely to the area of Monte Grappa massif and around Borso del Grappa, Crespano del Grappa, Paderno del Grappa, Possagno, Cavaso del Tomba, Alano di Piave, Quero, Feltre, Seren del Grappa, Arsiè, Cismon del Grappa, San Nazario, Solan, Pove del Grappa, and Romano d'Ezzelino.

== Process of production ==
After the milk is collected in the morning, it is left to rest overnight in a cool place. The fat is removed in a caldera of copper and the milk mixed, heated to a temperature ranging between 38 and 42 °C (100 and 108 °F), all in constant motion. Then rennet is added, which helps the whey from the cheese to coagulate into a large, soft ball. The procedure continues with the caldera reheated to 40 to 45 °C (104 to 113 °F). The curd is then pressed mildly in wooden molds, and purged for 24 hours.

The dough is then allowed to rest for 2 to 3 days, when it takes a smooth texture. The cheese is salted in brine with about 15 kg of salt per hectoliters of water for a period of 4 to 5 days so that the taste is not altered. The maturation follows in a suitable room for 25 to 120 days, although it can go on for over a year. The weight can vary from 2.5 to 5 kg, the diameter from 25 to 30 cm, and height from 5 to 8 cm. The curing also brings changes to the consistency of the dough which becomes grainier depending on its maturity. The cheese said "bastard" is of a yellow pale to a light straw color, which can also vary according to its seasoning.

== Nutritional values ==
The nutritional values of Bastardo del Grappa range from 350 to 460 calories per 100 g, with proteins exceeding 20%. A minimum of 27% of fats and humidity of 40% at the most.

== See also ==
- List of Italian cheeses
