= Whey cheese =

Dairy product made of whey

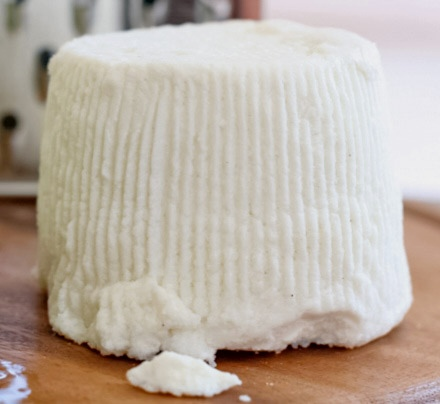
Ricotta, an Italian whey cheese

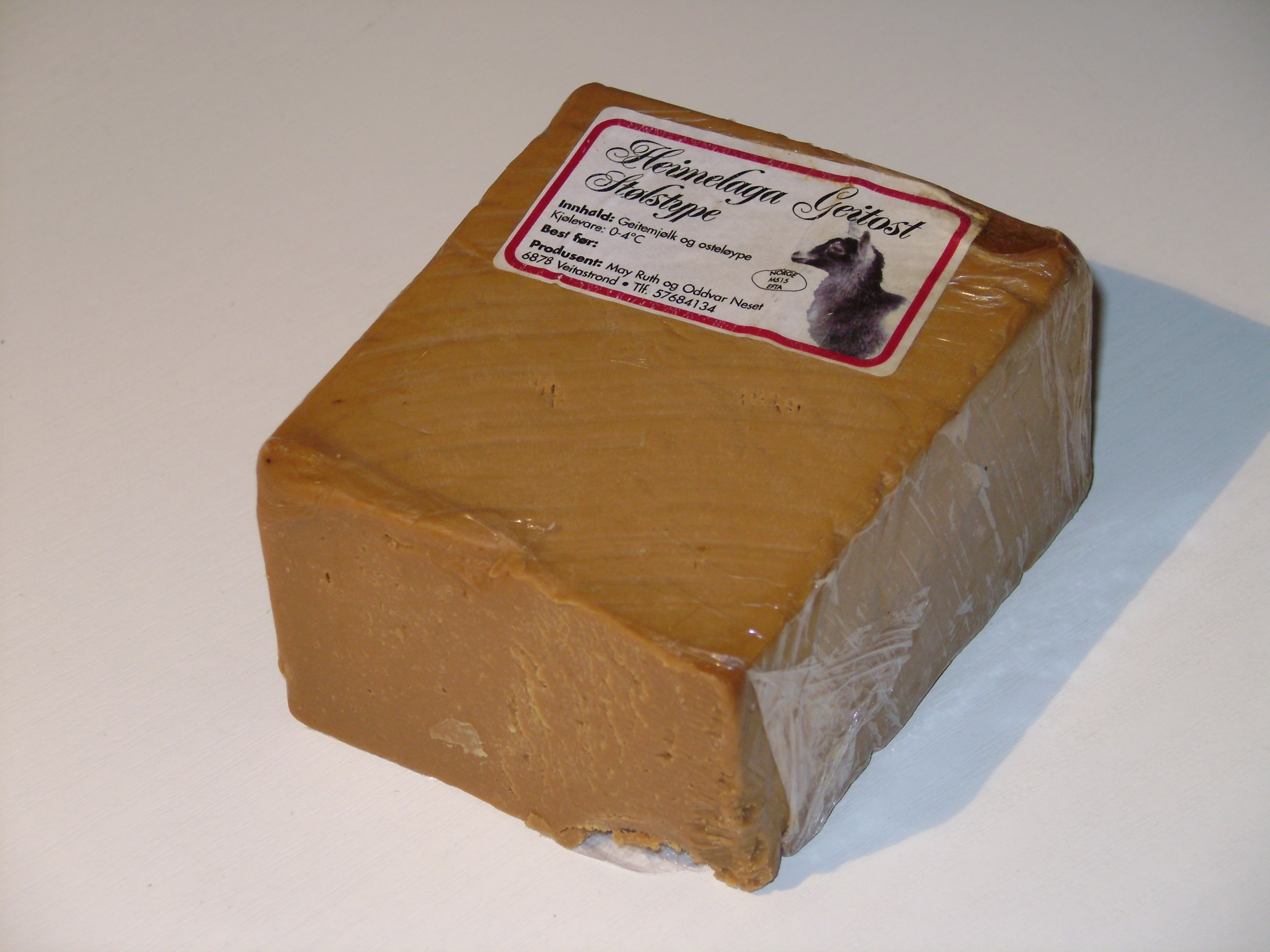
Geitost cheese is prepared using leftover whey.

Whey cheese is a dairy product made of whey, the by-product of cheesemaking. In cheese production, after the curds are separated, the whey still contains about 50% of the milk solids, including most of the lactose and lactalbumin. Whey cheese is made from those solids, which would otherwise be discarded.

There are two fundamentally different products made of whey and called whey cheese:

- Albumin cheese, made by coagulating the albumin in the whey with heat and possibly acid. Examples include ricotta and mizithra. Lactose content is low.
- Norwegian brunosts ("brown cheese"), made by boiling down the whey to concentrate the sugar, and consisting primarily of caramelized milk sugar. Mysost is such an example. Since these are not primarily made of coagulated milk proteins, they are technically not cheese. Lactose content is high.

Cheese and whey cheese are distinct categories in the Codex Alimentarius. In the appellation system of the European Union, protected whey cheeses are included in class 1.4 for "other products of animal origin" instead of class 1.3, for "cheeses".

== Production ==
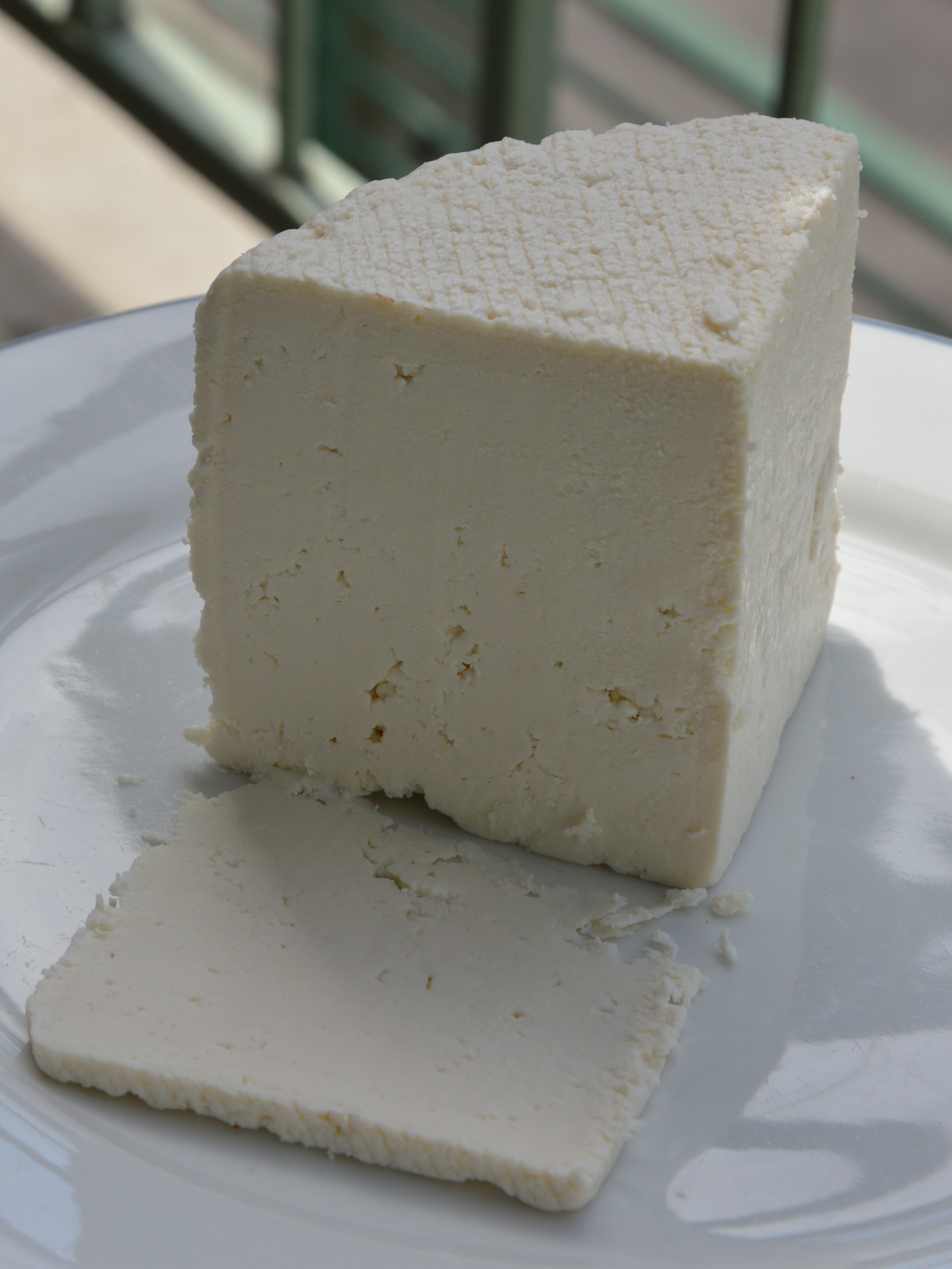
Urdă is a Romanian whey cheese.

Two different kinds of whey cheeses are made, through different processes:

=== Coagulated (albumin) cheese ===
To produce coagulated whey cheese, heat and optionally acid is used to coagulate the whey. This type has a relatively low lactose content and a white-to-yellowish color. It is possible to ripen albumin cheeses. In addition to whey, the Codex Alimentarius notes the established use of milk, cream, and buttermilk, plus sodium chloride and starter culture. The whey can be pre-concentrated.

Fresh albumin cheese is soft. It contains a lot of moisture and expires quickly. Ripened hard varieties have a much lower moisture content, making them preservable for much longer.

The production yield of coagulated whey cheese is generally lower than ordinary cheese, as whole milk contains only 1% whey protein. Yield is dependent on the composition of the whey, the addition of milk or cream, the production technology, and the composition (moisture content) of the final product. With efficient modern methods such as ultrafiltration, 10–20% of solids or more remain after the whey is mixed with cream and reduced.

=== Concentrated cheese ===
To produce a brunost, the whey is concentrated by boiling down and then molded. Cheeses produced using this method possess a relatively high lactose content. Typically, they have a yellowish-to-brown color and possess a sweet, cooked, or caramelized flavor. Pre-concentrated whey may be used. Additional ingredients with established use noted under the Codex Alimentarius are cream, milk, and other raw materials obtained from milk, plus sugar.

== Lactose content ==
Because almost all varieties generally contain significant amounts of whey, they are unsuitable for consumption by people who are lactose intolerant. Brocciu is lower in lactose.

== Varieties ==
- Anari, from Cyprus
- Anthotyros, from Greece
- Brocciu, from Corsica
- Brossat, or brull, from Catalonia, Spain
- Brousse, from Provence, France
- Manouri, from Greece
- Mató, from Catalonia, Spain
- Mizithra, from Greece
- Primost, from Norway
- Requeijão, from Portugal and Brazil
- Ricotta, from Italy
- Rigouta, from Tunisia
- Schabziger, from Switzerland
- Urdă, from Romania
- Xynomizithra, from Greece
- Xynotyro, from Greece
- Ziger/Sérac, from Switzerland
