= San Zenone degli Ezzelini =

- Comune
- Comune di San Zenone degli Ezzelini
- Location within Italy Location within Veneto
- Coordinates: 45°47′N 11°50′E
- Country: Italy
- Region: Veneto
- Province: Treviso (TV)
- Frazioni: Ca' Rainati, Liedolo

Government
  - Mayor: Fabio Marin

Area
  - Total: 19.97 km^{2} (7.71 sq mi)
- Elevation: 117 m (384 ft)

Population (31 December 2022)
  - Total: 7,339
  - Density: 367.5/km^{2} (951.8/sq mi)
- Demonym: Sanzenonesi
- Time zone: UTC+1 (CET)
  - Summer (DST): UTC+2 (CEST)
- Postal code: 31020
- Dialing code: 0423
- Patron saint: St. Zeno
- Saint day: April 12
- Website: Official website

San Zenone degli Ezzelini is a comune (municipality) in the Province of Treviso in the Italian region Veneto, located about 50 kilometres (31 mi) northwest of Venice and about 35 kilometres (22 mi) northwest of Treviso.

San Zenone degli Ezzelini borders the following municipalities: Borso del Grappa, Pieve del Grappa, Fonte, Loria, Mussolente, and Riese Pio X.

== History ==
=== Origins ===
San Zenone's territory was inhabited since prehistoric times, as attested by archaeological excavations that found stone utensils like scrapers and guns dated back to the Neolithic (5.000-2.500 BC). It was hypothesized the establishment of a factory that realized similar objects and that the area surrounding Asolo hosted the most important human settlements, whereas the underlying plan wasn't populated due to the presence of forests.

In the following centuries the Proto-Ligures migrated in those lands, introducing the metal fusion. They were succeeded by the Euganei and lastly by the Veneti.

=== Roman era ===
Since the 4th century BC, Veneti had contacts with the Romans, becoming their faithful allies. At the end of the 2nd century BC, the whole regione was completely submitted to Rome. The jurisdiction of San Zenone was assigned to the municipium of Asolo that decided its centuriation and to build up the Via Postumia and the Via Aurelia of Veneto. The 'commune preserved many historical proofs of this period, like gravestons and remains of houses.

=== Middle Age ===
Even after the fall of the Roman Empire, san Zenone didn't lost its strategical military role. During this period the hill was probably fortified by the Lombards. Possibly, the presence of a castle originated the development of a residential area, entiched by a church. Initially, it depended from the pieve of Sant'Eulalia, actually a fraction of the commune of Borso del Grappa, but around the 10th century it should have assumed ecclesiastical autonomy. In fact, a plebem S. Zenonis cum medietate castri et pertinentiis suis was mentioned in a Latin list of the possessions of the bishop of Treviso dated back to 1152.

In 1036, Ezzelo, forefather of the powerful Ezzelini family, moved to Italy following Conrad the Salic's army. Subsequently, he got the investiture for the lands located at the feet of Monte Grappa, including san Zenone. In the second half of the 12th century, the Ghibelline Ezzelino III da Romano, descendant of Ezzelo, unified the Veneto up to Brescia. In 1259, he was defeated, imprisoned in Soncino and died after having refused drugs and sacraments.

His dominion broke up rapidly and Alberico, the Ezzelino's son and most important ally, took refuge in the San Zenone's castle: here, after a long siege of a league of Guelph cities, he was captured by his enemies and killed together with his family the following year.

Since 1314, San Zenone returned under the control of Treviso.

=== The Serenissima ===
In 1339 was subjugated by the Republic of Venice. In the same year, was instituted the podesteria of Asolo to which were assigned San Zenone and Liedolo. The Venetian conquest was concluded solely in 1388.

Except for the War of the League of Cambrai, the Venetian rulig created a period of political stability and economical prosperity for the local population.

=== Napoleon and the Kingdom of Lombardy–Venetia ===
In 1797, Napoleon put end to the Republic of Venice. This event was followed by a period of crisis during which the Veneto was annexed to the Archduchy of Austria, then to France and again to the Austrian Empire that in 1815 created the Kingdom of Lombardy–Venetia.

=== Kingdom of Italy ===
In 1866, San Zenone became part of the Kingdom of Italy. In the following years was completed the new parish church, which replaced the older and unstable holy building.

The town was known simply as San Zenone until 1867.

=== Coats of arms ===
The odiern coats of arms was adopted in 1889. It represents the tower of the ancient medieval castle of San Zenone. The mohawk ostrich with a horseshoe is the crest that belongs to the Ezzelini family's emblem.

The commune has also a gonfalon with the same insignia than that of the coats of arms

== Demographic evolution ==
Historical population

Year	Pop.	±%
1861	?	—
1871	2,986	—
1881	3,396	+13.7%
1901	3,779	+11.3%
1911	4,389	+16.1%
1921	4,928	+12.3%

Year	Pop.	±%
1931	4,765	−3.3%
1936	4,500	−5.6%
1951	4,675	+3.9%
1961	4,072	−12.9%
1971	4,151	+1.9%
1981	4,571	+10.1%

Year	Pop.	±%
1991	5,386	+17.8%
2001	6,506	+20.8%
2011	7,391	+13.6%
2021	7,282	−1.5%

Source: Data from ISTAT

=== Foreign ethnicities and minorities ===
As of December 31, 2022, foreigners residents in the municipality were 872, i.e. 11.9% of the population. The largest groups are shown below:

1. Romania 216
2. North Macedonia 200
3. Morocco 73
4. Senegal 58
5. Ghana 57
6. Pakistan 43
7. China 37
8. Kosovo 35
9. Albania 31

== Main sights ==
- Of the old castle only a tower, which is the town's symbol, remains.
- Villa Tedesco (16th century)
- Villa di Rovero (remade in the 18th century)

== Twin towns ==
- Majano, Italy, since 2000
- Marzling, Germany, since 2006
