= Fonte, Veneto =

Fonte
- Comune
- Comune di Fonte
- Location within Italy Location within Veneto
- Coordinates: 45°47′N 11°52′E
- Country: Italy
- Region: Veneto
- Province: Province of Treviso (TV)
- Frazioni: Fonte alto, Onè of Fonte

Area
  - Total: 14.6 km^{2} (5.6 sq mi)

Population (Dec. 2004)
  - Total: 5,731
  - Density: 393/km^{2} (1,020/sq mi)
- Demonym: Fontesi
- Time zone: UTC+1 (CET)
  - Summer (DST): UTC+2 (CEST)
- Postal code: 31010
- Dialing code: 0423

Fonte is a comune (municipality) in the Province of Treviso in the Italian region Veneto, located about 50 kilometres (31 mi) northwest of Venice and about 35 kilometres (22 mi) northwest of Treviso. As of 31 December 2004, it had a population of 5,731 and an area of 14.6 km^{2} (5.6 sq mi).

Fonte borders the following municipalities: Asolo, Crespano del Grappa, Pieve del Grappa, Riese Pio X, San Zenone degli Ezzelini.

== Population ==
Historical population

Year	Pop.	±%
1861	?	—
1871	2,667	—
1881	2,894	+8.5%
1901	2,889	−0.2%
1911	3,363	+16.4%

Year	Pop.	±%
1921	3,739	+11.2%
1931	3,428	−8.3%
1936	3,370	−1.7%
1951	3,619	+7.4%
1961	3,294	−9.0%

Year	Pop.	±%
1971	3,797	+15.3%
1981	4,435	+16.8%
1991	4,683	+5.6%
2001	5,479	+17.0%

Source: Data from ISTAT
