= Pasta Rigo =

Italian pasta manufacturer

- Industry: Food
- Founded: 1929; 97 years ago as Pasta Del Grappa
- Founder: Carlo Rigo
- Headquarters: Crespano del Grappa, Italy
- Key people: Pierangelo Rigo (CEO), Arrigo Rigo (Chairman)
- Products: Pasta
- Website: www.pastificiorigo.it

Pastificio Rigo, also known as Pasta Rigo, is a historic Italian pasta factory based in Crespano del Grappa. The company which is a fourth generation business, is currently chaired by Arrigo Rigo, while CEO is Pierangelo Rigo.

== History ==
The company was founded in 1929 as Pasta del Grappa, after Carlo Rigo, a local merchant who lost his fortunes during the 1929 crisis, along with his sons began producing pasta for the local market in small volumes.

The sons of Carlo, Napoleon and Mario transformed the lab into a small factory, focusing on high quality standards, the brand has developed rapidly and has been extensively expanded. The next generation, composed by Arrigo and Alberto, Arrigo and Alberto, successfully faced the challenges and opportunities posed by the industrialization of the Italian business landscape of those years, thanks mainly to the choice of cheaper modern cellophane-based boxing and the choice to produce very special pasta shapes. In recent years, whole and gluten-free production has been added. At present, Rigo operates at the top slice of this niche, producing also as a white label co-packer and combining Italian promotion agencies with Italian firms abroad such as the Italian Trade Agency.

== Certifications ==
The company has been awarded with numerous certifications such as the International Food Standard (IFS), Food BRC and ICEA for Organic, and has been the subject of academic research in a project of Ca' Foscari University of Venice, Veneto and Veneto Industrial League about efficiency and resilience during adverse macroeconomic conditions. Rigo is renowned in the industry as an ethical employer with a high ratio of women in management positions and a structured program of CSR.
