= Anari cheese =

Cypriot goat cheese

Anari
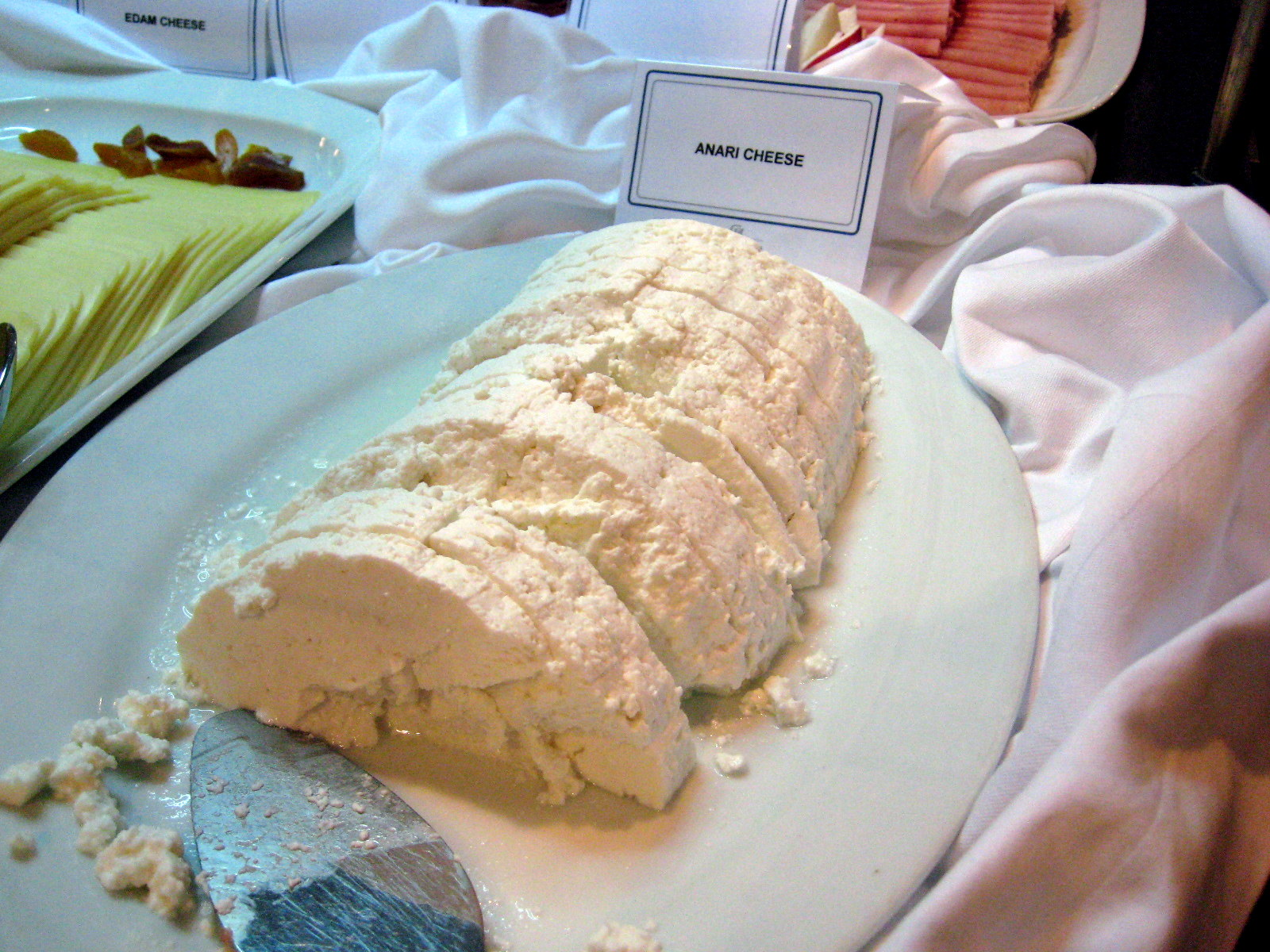
- Country of origin: Cyprus
- Region, town: Islandwide
- Source of milk: Goat or sheep milk
- Texture: Very soft to very hard
- Aging time: None
- Certification: N/A

Anari (Greek: αναρή, Turkish: nor) is a fresh mild whey cheese produced in Cyprus. Although much less known than other Cypriot cheeses (e.g. halloumi), it gained popularity following publicity. One of the main industrial producers on the island won a silver medal award for anari in the 2005 World Cheese Awards in the UK.

== Production ==
The whey used is usually a by-product in the production process of other harder cheeses, commonly that of halloumi or kefalotyri cheese. The whey is gradually heated to 65 °C (149 °F) in a large cooking bowl. A small amount of goat or sheep milk (5–10%) can be added at this temperature to improve the end product quality. The temperature is then increased to boiling point, whilst mixing. At 80–85 °C (176–185 °F) small crumbly curds of anari start forming and are skimmed off the surface using a slotted spoon or a colander. They are placed in a container that allows further drainage and then cut into cubes of roughly 10 cm sides. Excluding the drainage, the above process takes roughly one hour.

== Variants ==
In its simple form, anari has a chalk-white appearance with a very soft consistency, similar in many ways to the likes of mizithra cheese, cottage cheese and ricotta. Salt is often added and the product dried through gentle heating (in bygone times it was just left in the sun) and further maturation to create an extremely hard variant.

== Culinary uses ==
- If not intended for hardening, anari must be consumed soon after its production as it is very perishable. Most locals will consume it for breakfast mixed with syrups (usually carob based) or honey.
- Bourekia is a traditional Cypriot dish of pastries packed with various anari-based fillings (savoury and sweet).
- Cheesecakes are similar to bourekia but with a filo pastry cover instead.
- Dry anari is too hard to cut and is hence invariably grated and used to garnish pasta dishes or thicken sauces. It is also used to make Flaounes (Φλαούνες) which is a traditional pastry with dry anari prepared in Orthodox Easter.

== Nutritional facts ==
100 g of commercially produced fresh anari has a typical composition of:

Fat	15 g
Carbohydrates	2 g
Proteins	11 g
Cholesterol	80 mg
Energy	195 kcal

== Other ==
Anari is also known in Cyprus as analati anari (Greek: ανάλατη αναρή) meaning "unsalted anari", since the regular anari is salted. Also anari has a prominent place in Cypriot culture as it is mentioned in the traditional fairy tale Spanos and the forty dragons.

== See also ==
- Ricotta salata – another pressed whey cheese
- Mizithra
- Anthotyros
