= Chèvre chaud =

French dish, consisting of Chèvre cheese served hot

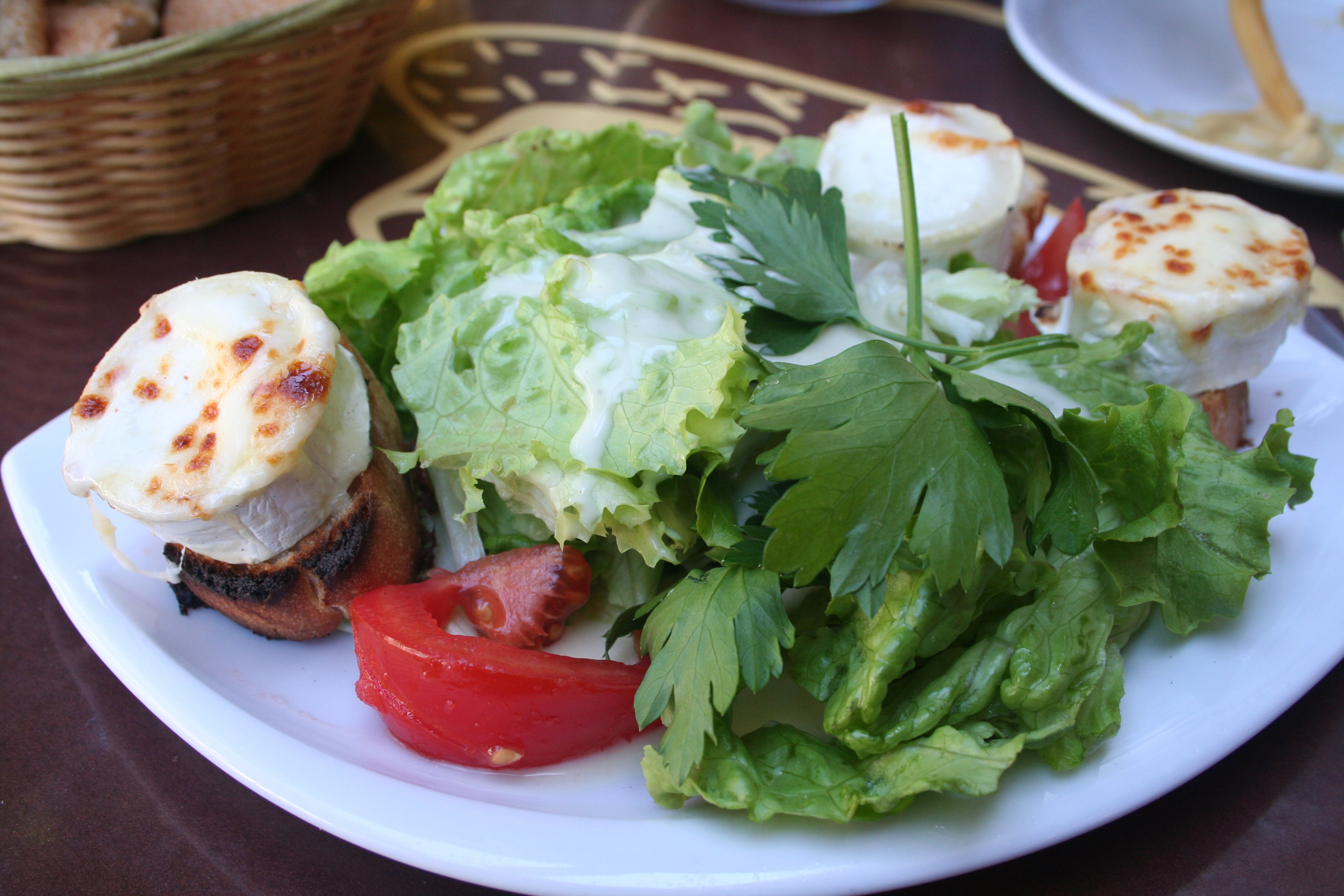
- Serving temperature: Hot
- Main ingredients: Chèvre cheese, Baguette

Chèvre chaud (chaud means 'hot') is a French dish, consisting of Chèvre cheese served hot. It is usually made by broiling the Chèvre cheese on French bread, and is often served with a green salad, and accompanied by vinaigrette, olive oil or balsamic vinegar.
