= Xinomyzithra =

Greek sheep or goat cheese

Xynomizithra
- Country of origin: Greece
- Region, town: N/A
- Source of milk: Goats, ewes
- Pasteurized: Not traditionally, but commercially yes
- Texture: Soft
- Fat content: approx. 15%
- Protein content: approx. 15.5%
- Dimensions: various
- Weight: various, usually ½ or 1 kilo
- Aging time: 2 months
- Certification: As Xynomyzithra Kritis

Xynomizithra or xynomyzithra (Greek: Ξινομυζήθρα) is a Greek whey cheese with some added milk; it is a sour variant of Mizithra, and made from ewes' and/or goats' milk. The proportion of full-cream milk is about 15%.

It is mainly produced on the island of Crete but other areas in Greece also produce it. Ξυνομυζήθρα Κρήτης / Xynomyzithra Kritis (xynomizithra of Crete) is registered as a protected designation of origin in the EU and the UK.

== Production ==
Xynomizithra is made from strained ewe and/or goat whey which is heated and stirred. A small amount of full-cream milk (up to 15% for Xynomyzithra Kritis) is then added. The resulting curd stands for 30 minutes and is then put into molds to drain. It is then pressed and ripened for not less than 2 months.

== Serving ==
It comes in various sizes and its shape is usually truncated cone or ball. The cheese is soft, snow-white, creamy, and moist, with a sour taste.

It is commonly served with honey as a dessert. It is also used as a table cheese, in salads, and in baked goods, notably in small cheese pies (kalitsounia).

== See also ==
- List of cheeses
- Cuisine of Greece
