= Fietta =

Fietta is an Italian surname. Notable people with the surname include:

- Giovanni Fietta (born 1984), Italian footballer
- Giuseppe Fietta (1883–1960), Italian cardinal
