= Mizithra =

Greek sheep or goat cheese

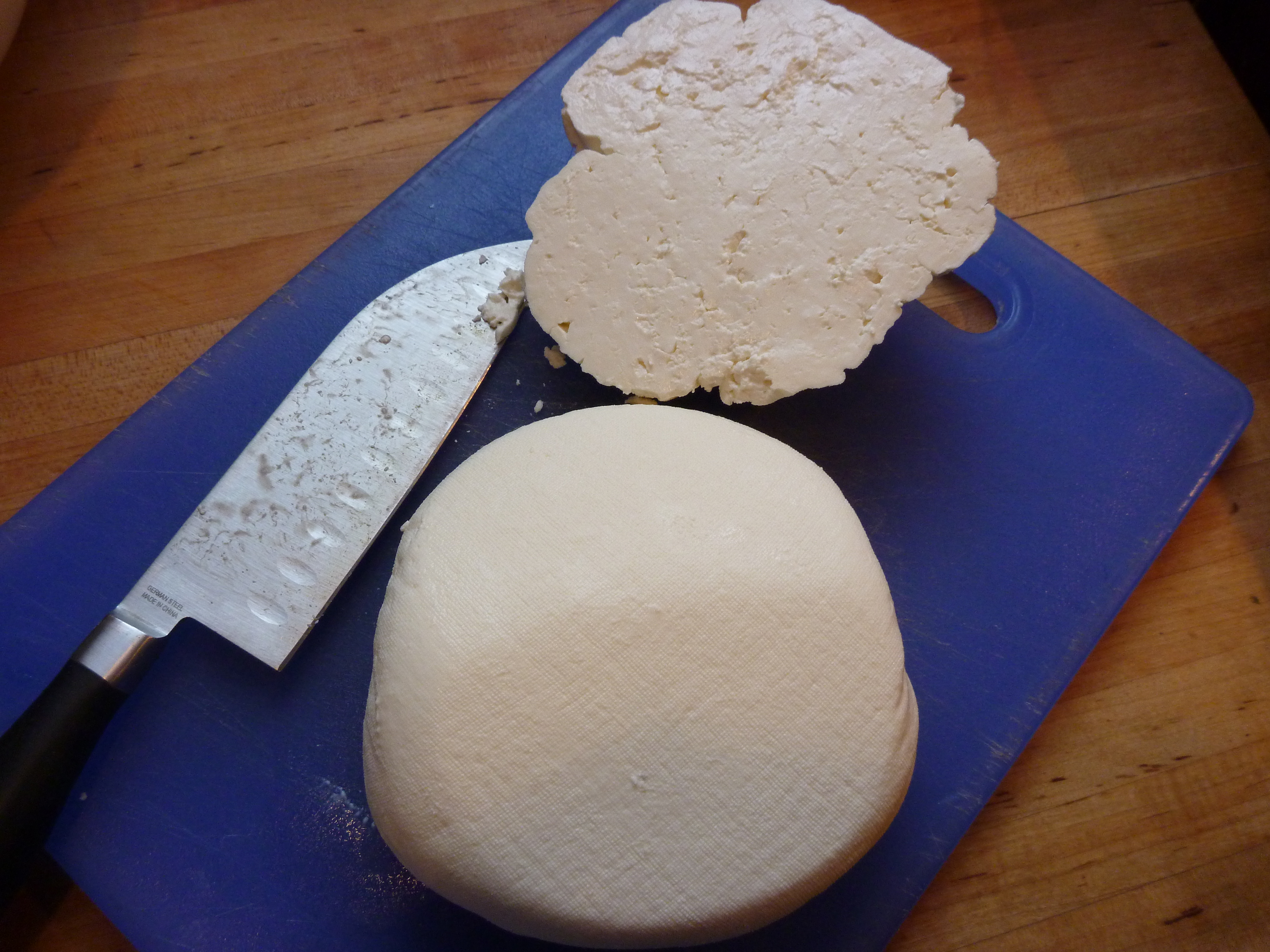
- Country of origin: Greece
- Region, town: N/A
- Source of milk: Goats, Ewes
- Texture: Soft
- Fat content: approx. 15%
- Protein content: approx. 15.5%
- Dimensions: various
- Weight: various, usually ½ or 1 kilo
- Aging time: 1 day

Mizithra or myzithra (Greek: μυζήθρα [miˈziθra]) is a Greek whey cheese or mixed milk-whey cheese from sheep or goats, or both. It is sold both as a fresh cheese, similar to Italian ricotta, and as a salt-dried grating cheese, similar to Italian ricotta salata. The ratio of milk to whey is usually 7 to 3.

It is primarily produced on the island of Crete, but is widespread throughout Greece. It is essentially the same as Anthotyros though the latter may contain some cow's milk. In Cyprus a similar cheese is known as "Anari" (Αναρή in Greek, Nor in Cypriot Turkish, Lor in Turkish).

== Production ==
Mizithra is made from raw, whole ewe's or goat's milk: the milk is brought to a slow boil for a few minutes and then curdled by adding rennet or whey from a previous batch (see below) or else some acidic substance such as lemon juice, vinegar or even a fresh broken fig tree sprig. As soon as curds have formed they are poured into a cheesecloth bag and hung to drain. The whey dripping out of the bag can be used to curdle the next batch of mizithra. After a few days, mizithra forms a sweet, moist, soft mass in the shape of the hanging bag with a rounded bottom and a conical, wrinkly top. At this stage, it is called "sweet" or "fresh mizithra" and may be eaten or, often, baked in pies.

== Xynomizithra ==
Mizithra that is salted and aged becomes dryer, denser, saltier and more sour. This xynomizithra ('sour mizithra') is often grated.

== Serving ==
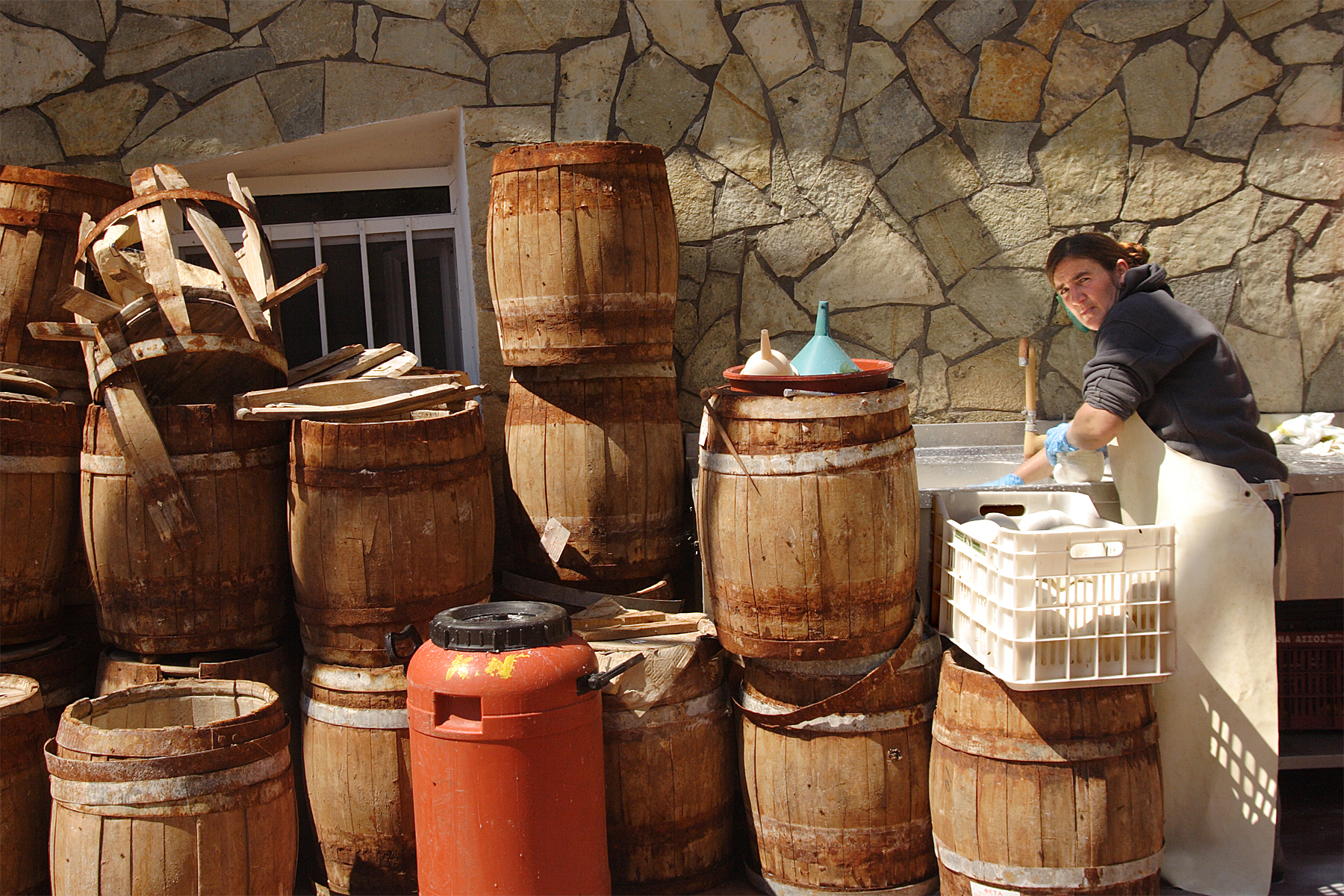
Aged Mizithra production in Achaea Peloponnese

The cheese is soft, snow-white, creamy, and moist. Since no salt is added, it has an almost sweet and milky taste. It is eaten as dessert with honey or as a meze with olives and tomato. It is used as a table cheese, as well as in salads, pastries and in baking, notably in little cheese pies (handful size) and Sfakiani pita (pie from the Sfakia region).

In its salted, aged form it is considered the grating cheese par excellence of Greek cuisine, and is especially suited for sprinkling over hot pasta.

== Toponymy ==
The town of Mystras takes its name from a cone-shaped hill, called Mizithra from its resemblance to the cheese (Steven Runciman, A Traveller's Alphabet, "Morea").

== See also ==
- List of cheeses
- Cuisine of Greece
- Manouri - another Greek sheep cheese, similar flavor, not as dry as mizithra
