= Xynotyro =

Greek sheep or goat cheese

Xynotyri is an unpasteurized whey cheese from Greece made from sheep's milk or goat's milk, with a hard and flaky consistency, a pungent aroma and a yogurt-like sweet and sour taste. "Xynotyri" means "sour cheese" in Greek. Traditionally, the cheese is drained and cured in reed baskets or allowed to mature in bags made of animal skin. Cow's milk is not utilized in the production.

Xynotyri cheese can be consumed either as fresh cheese or after being ripened with the use of naturally dominating microflora during a three-month maturing period. The Lactobacillus strains in Xynotyri have antibacterial effects that kill Salmonella pathogens.

== See also ==
- List of cheeses
