= Paderno del Grappa =

Paderno del Grappa Padernesi
- Comune
- Paderno del Grappa
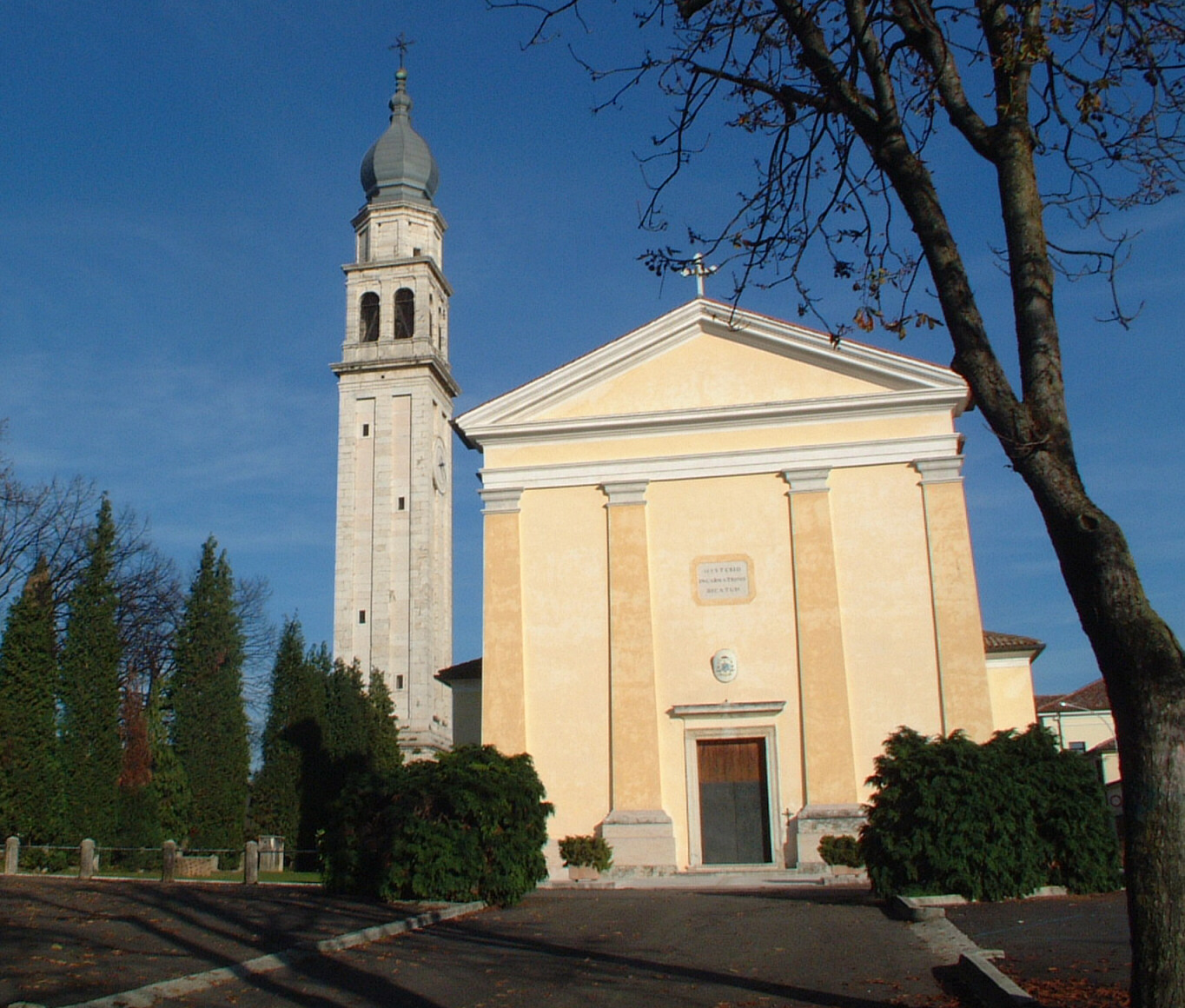
- Parish church.

- Location within Italy Location within Veneto
- Coordinates: 45°50′N 11°51′E
- Country: Italy
- Region: Veneto
- Province: Treviso (TV)

Area
  - Total: 36 km^{2} (14 sq mi)
- Elevation: 292 m (958 ft)

Population (31 December 2017)
  - Total: 2,195
  - Density: 61/km^{2} (160/sq mi)
- Time zone: UTC+1 (CET)
  - Summer (DST): UTC+2 (CEST)
- Postal code: 31010
- Dialing code: 0423
- Patron saint: Annunciation of the Blessed Virgin Mary
- Saint day: March 25
- Website: Official website

Paderno del Grappa is a small town and a frazione of Pieve del Grappa, a comune in the province of Treviso, in the Veneto region in Italy. Paderno del Grappa is located at the base of Mount Grappa, in the mountain range of the Venetian Prealps. Paderno del Grappa is approximately 45 miles (72 km) north of Venice, and close to larger towns, such as Asolo and Bassano del Grappa, which are located in the Treviso province and the Vicenza province, respectively.

== History ==
Paderno del Grappa was a separate comune (municipality) until 30 January 2019, when it was merged with Crespano del Grappa to form a new larger comune.

== Twin towns ==
Paderno del Grappa is twinned with:

- Mallersdorf-Pfaffenberg, Germany, since 1990
