= Pove del Grappa =

- Comune
- Comune di Pove del Grappa
- Location within Italy Location within Veneto
- Coordinates: 45°48′N 11°44′E
- Country: Italy
- Region: Veneto
- Province: Vicenza (VI)
- Frazioni: Ponte San Lorenzo

Government
  - Mayor: Orio Mocellin

Area
  - Total: 9.84 km^{2} (3.80 sq mi)
- Elevation: 163 m (535 ft)

Population (31 December 2015)
  - Total: 3,083
  - Density: 313/km^{2} (811/sq mi)
- Demonym(s): Poati, Povesi
- Time zone: UTC+1 (CET)
  - Summer (DST): UTC+2 (CEST)
- Postal code: 36020
- Dialing code: 0424
- Patron saint: St. Vigilius
- Saint day: 26 June
- Website: Official website

Pove del Grappa is a town in the province of Vicenza, Veneto, Italy. It is east of SS47.

Maïmouna Guerresi a photographer, sculptor, video and installation artist was born here in 1951.
