= Anthotyros =

Traditional Greek whey cheese

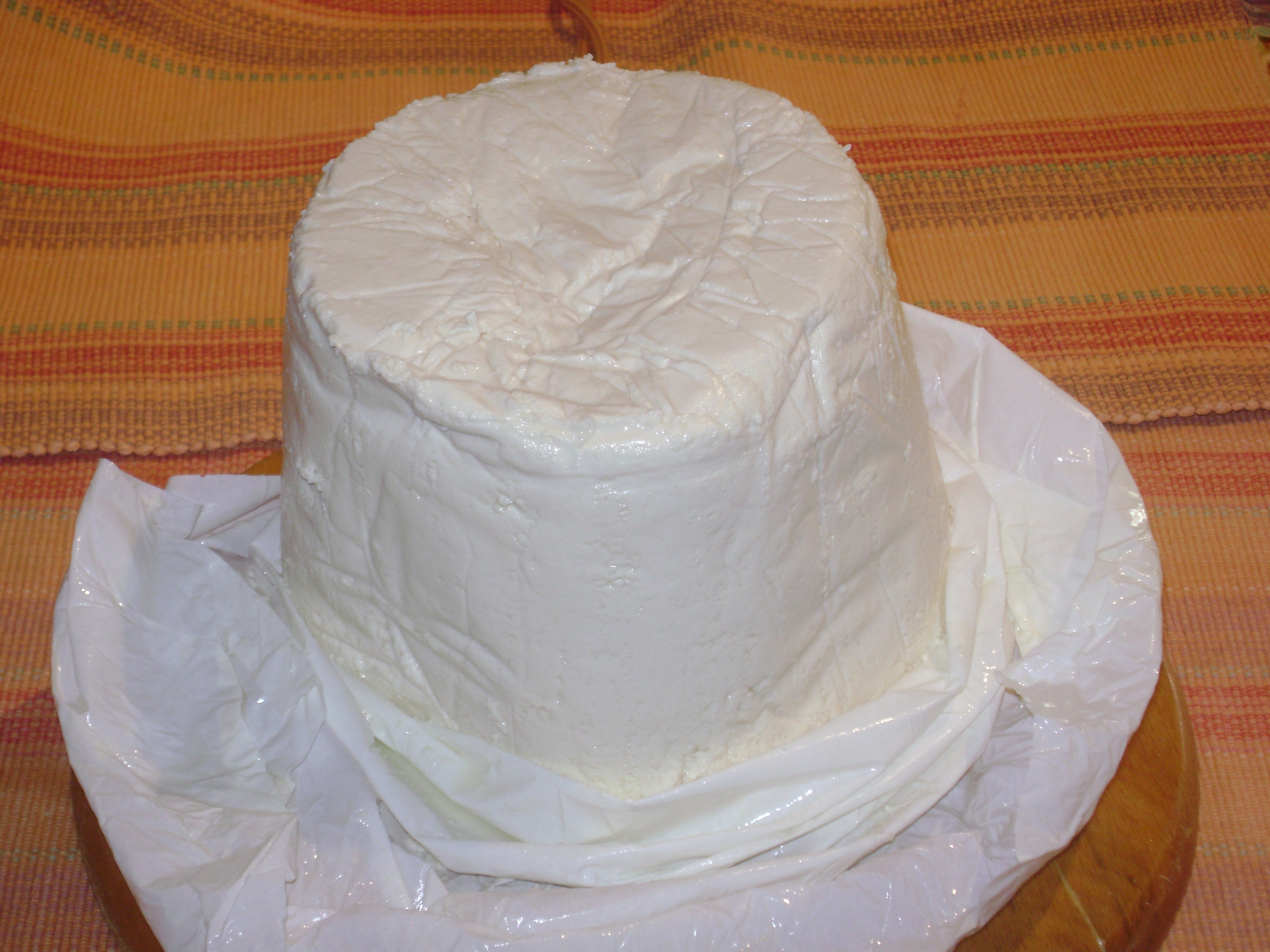
- A block of anthotyros, lying on top of its protective paper covering
- Country of origin: Greece
- Source of milk: Goats, Ewes
- Pasteurized: Not traditionally, but commercially yes
- Texture: Hard (Dry) / Soft (Fresh)
- Fat content: 16.6% 65.9%
- Protein content: 9.6%
- Dimensions: various
- Weight: various, usually 1/2 or 1 kilo
- Aging time: 10 Days

Anthotyros (Greek: Ανθότυρος) (Anthotyro in modern Greek, "flowery cheese") is a traditional fresh cheese. There are dry Anthotyros and fresh Anthotyros. Dry Anthotyros is a matured cheese similar to Mizithra. Anthotyros is made with milk and whey from sheep or goats, sometimes in combination. The ratio of milk to whey usually is 9-to-1. It is commonly a truncated cone, but when shipped in containers may be crumbled, as it is removed. It may be unpasteurized, where law allows.

Milk is boiled at moderate temperature for ten minutes and then rennet and salt is added, while ruffling. The mix is left in large shallow tanks resulting in a part skim mixture. The following day, salt is added to the mix which is then poured into a basket with tulle and is left to drain. Salt is added every day for another three to four days. At this stage, the cheese is still fresh but less soft. If left to mature, thick salt is often added to cover the exterior.

The fresh variant is dry, white, soft or medium hardness, with a sweet, creamy taste, with no rind and no salt. It might be eaten for breakfast with honey and fruit, or in savory dishes with oil, tomato and wild herbs. The dry variant is hard, dry, white and salty; it can have a powerful smell similar to sherry. It might be eaten on spaghetti or salads.

Anthotyros is produced in Greece, commonly in Thrace, Macedonia, the Ionian Islands and Crete.

== See also ==
- List of cheeses
- Cuisine of Greece
