= Crespano del Grappa =

- Frazione
- Location of Crespano del Grappa in Italy Crespano del Grappa (Italy)
- Coordinates: 45°50′N 11°50′E
- Country: Italy
- Region: Veneto
- Province: Treviso (TV)
- Comune: Pieve del Grappa

Area
  - Total: 17 km^{2} (6.6 sq mi)
- Elevation: 300 m (980 ft)

Population (31 December 2008)
  - Total: 4,767
  - Density: 280/km^{2} (730/sq mi)
- Demonym: Crespanesi
- Time zone: UTC+1 (CET)
  - Summer (DST): UTC+2 (CEST)
- Postal code: 31017
- Dialing code: 0423
- Patron saint: San Marco, San Pancrazio
- Saint day: 25 April

Crespano del Grappa is a small town and a frazione of Pieve del Grappa in the province of Treviso, Veneto region of Italy. As of 2007 Crespano del Grappa had an estimated population of 4,680.

== History ==
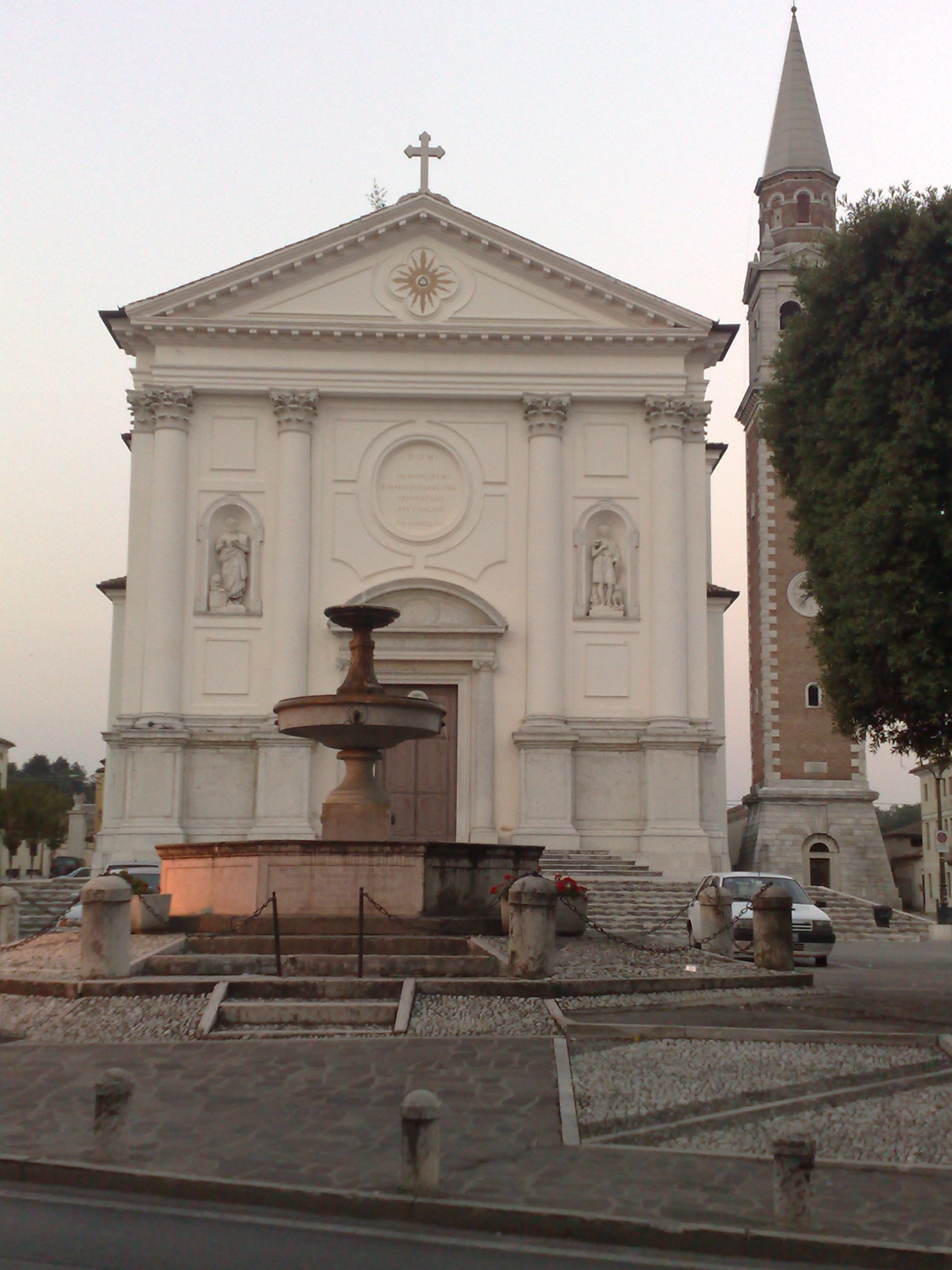
Crespano church

Crespano del Grappa was a separate comune (municipality) until 30 January 2019, when it was merged with Paderno del Grappa to form a new comune.

== Twin towns ==
Crespano del Grappa was twinned with:

- Griffith, Australia
- Folsom, United States
