= Borso del Grappa =

- Comune
- Comune di Borso del Grappa
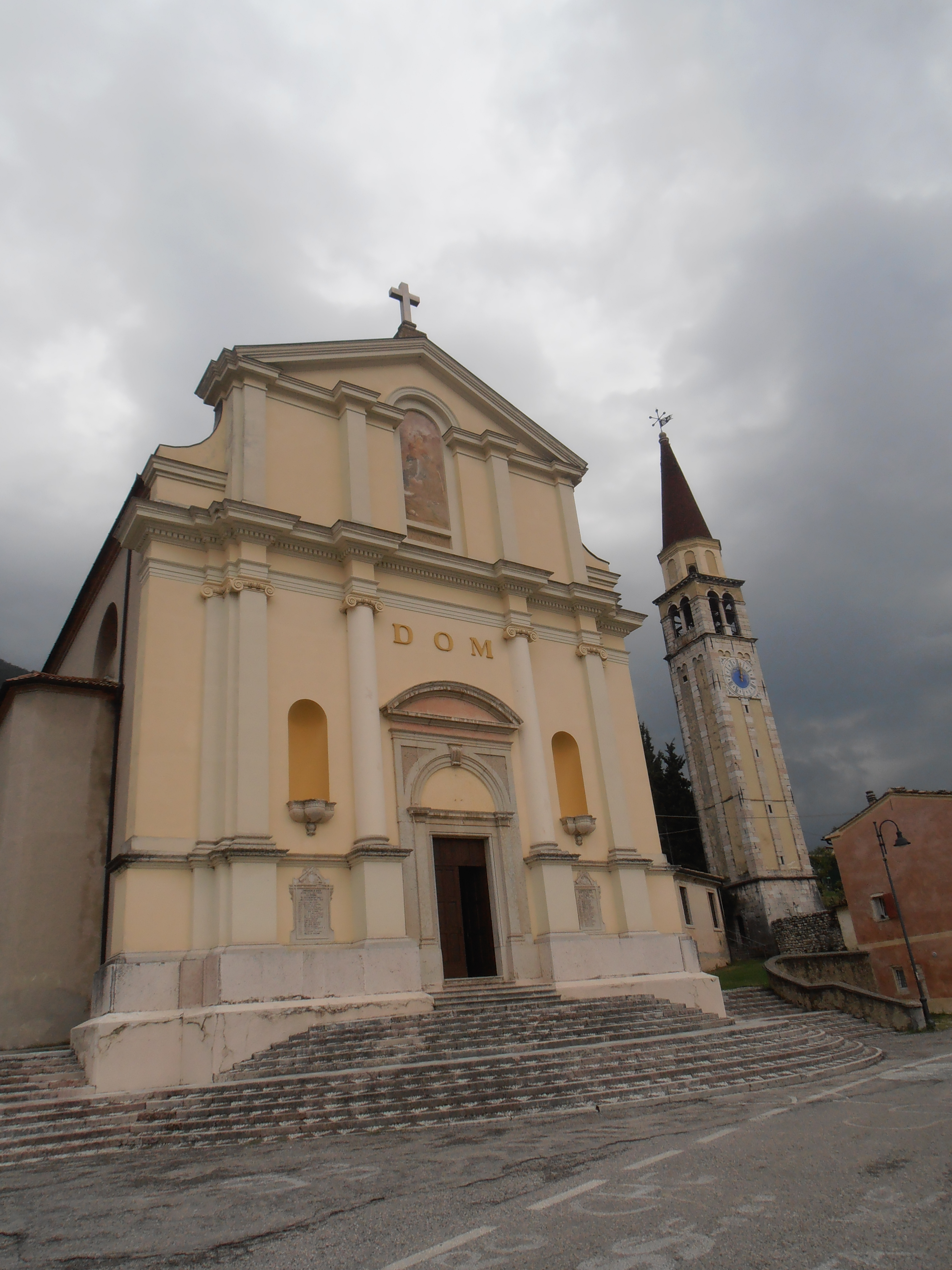

- Location within Italy Location within Veneto
- Coordinates: 45°49′N 11°48′E
- Country: Italy
- Region: Veneto
- Province: Treviso (TV)
- Frazioni: Sant'Eulalia, Semonzo

Government
  - Mayor: Alessandro Sallustio (commissar)

Area
  - Total: 33 km^{2} (13 sq mi)
- Elevation: 279 m (915 ft)

Population (30 November 2024)
  - Total: 5,951
  - Density: 180/km^{2} (470/sq mi)
- Demonym: Borsatti
- Time zone: UTC+1 (CET)
  - Summer (DST): UTC+2 (CEST)
- Postal code: 31030
- Dialing code: 0423
- Patron saint: Madonna del Carmine
- Saint day: 16 July
- Website: Official website

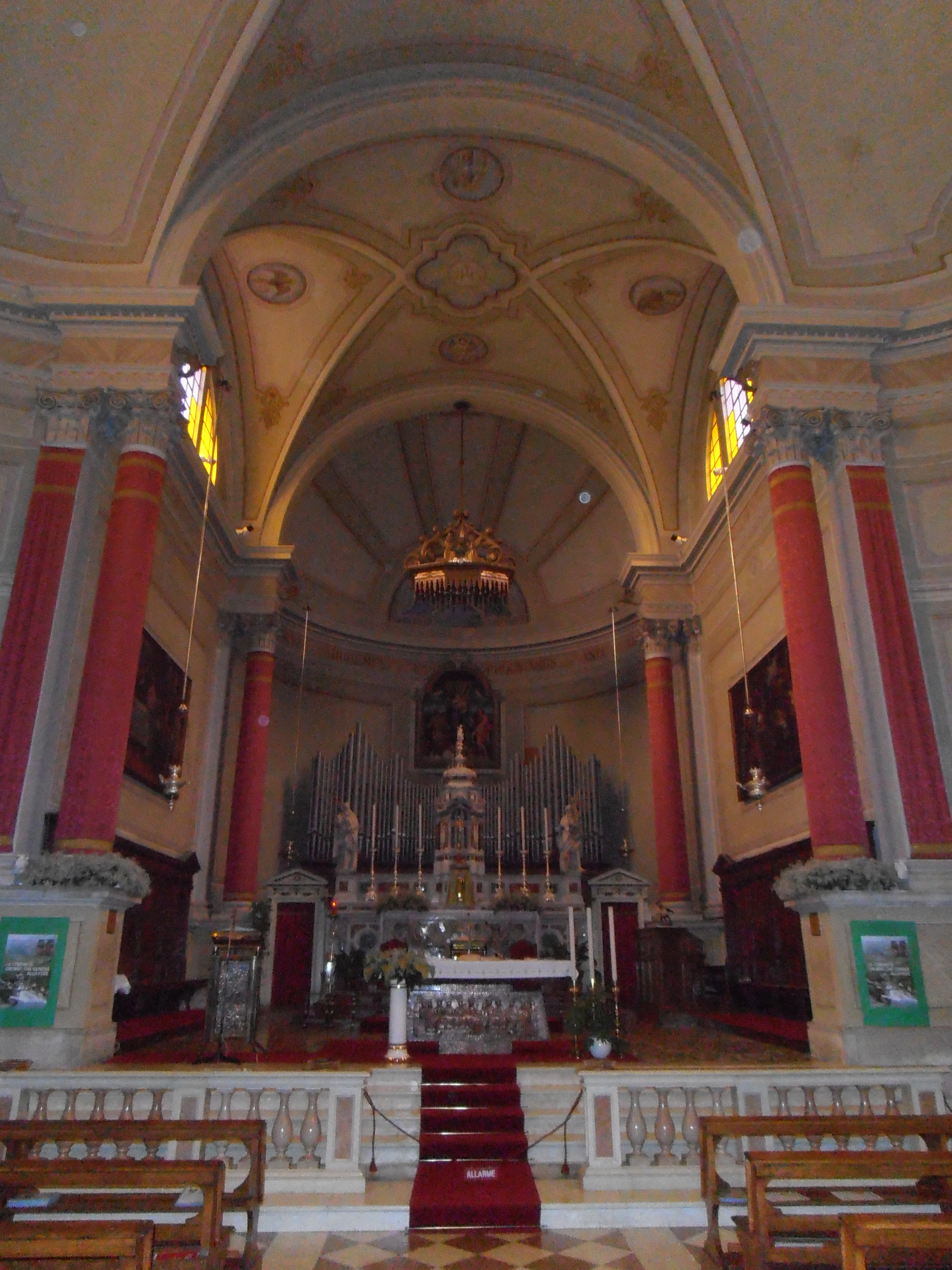
Interior of the church

Borso del Grappa is a municipality of the Province of Treviso in the Veneto region of northeastern Italy.
