= Pouligny =

Pouligny may refer to:

== Communes ==
- Pouligny-Notre-Dame, a commune in Indre, France
- Pouligny-Saint-Martin, a commune in Indre, France
- Pouligny-Saint-Pierre, Indre, a commune in Indre, France

== Other ==
- Pouligny-Saint-Pierre cheese, a cheese made in Indre, France
