= Pouligny-Saint-Pierre =

Pouligny-Saint-Pierre may refer to:

- Pouligny-Saint-Pierre cheese
- Pouligny-Saint-Pierre, Indre
