= Catherine Donnelly =

American nutritionist

Catherine Wright Donnelly (born 1956) is Professor of Nutrition and Food Science at the University of Vermont, and the Editor-in-Chief of The Oxford Companion to Cheese, which won the 2017 James Beard Award for Reference and Scholarship.

== Education ==
Donnelly received her B.S. from the University of Vermont after attending school there from 1974 to 1978. Her degrees include a M.S. and Ph.D. in food science, both from North Carolina State University, specializing in food microbiology.

== Career ==
Donnelly joined the faculty of the University of Vermont in 1983. At that time, a large outbreak of illness caused by a relatively unknown bacterium, Listeria monocytogenes, occurred in Boston, Massachusetts. Donnelly's laboratory began research on this dangerous foodborne pathogen. She developed procedures for detection of Listeria in food, resulting in UVM medium, used by the USDA as part of its official meat testing program. Donnelly worked collaboratively with the FDA in refuting theories that Listeria could survive pasteurization. She has lectured extensively on the topic of Listeria.

From 1988 to 1998, Donnelly served as the Associate Dean of the College of Agriculture and Life Sciences at the University of Vermont, and served as Interim Dean from 1998 to 1999. Donnelly served as a member of the National Advisory Committee on Microbiological Criteria for Foods from January 1999 to 2005, being appointed initially by President Clinton and later reappointed by President Bush. In January 1999 she was appointed to the Science Advisory Board to the FDA's National Center for Toxicological Research.

Donnelly developed an interest in artisan cheese and controlling the threat of Listeria contamination in artisan cheese. In 2004, she and her colleague Paul Kindstedt became co-directors of the Vermont Institute for Artisan Cheese (VIAC) at UVM, an organization that provided education to over 1500 individuals from 48 states and 13 countries. Through VIAC, Donnelly was able to collaborate with cheese scientists from around the globe on issues concerning cheese safety. Her book Cheese and Microbes (ASM Press, 2014), examines the microbiological complexities of cheese as a living food.

Donnelly also served as Editor-in-Chief of The Oxford Companion to Cheese (Oxford University Press, 2016), where she was responsible for overseeing 325 contributing authors from 35 countries. The Companion received a James Beard Award for Reference and Scholarship in 2017, and was a finalist for the André Simon Food Book Award the same year.

Donnelly received the Maurice Weber Laboratorian Award from the International Association of Food Protection in 2006 In 2011, she was named a Fellow of the Institute of Food Technologists (IFT). Donnelly served as the Scientific Editor of the "Microbiology and Safety" section of IFT's Journal of Food Science from 2006 to 2016.

Donnelly had a cameo appearance in Netflix's documentary adaptation of Michael Pollan’s book Cooked: A Natural History of Transformation.

In 2019, Donnelly's book Ending the War on Artisan Cheese was nominated for the Bookseller/Diagram Prize for Oddest Title of the Year.
