= Pouligny-Saint-Pierre, Indre =

Pouligny-Saint-Pierre
- Commune
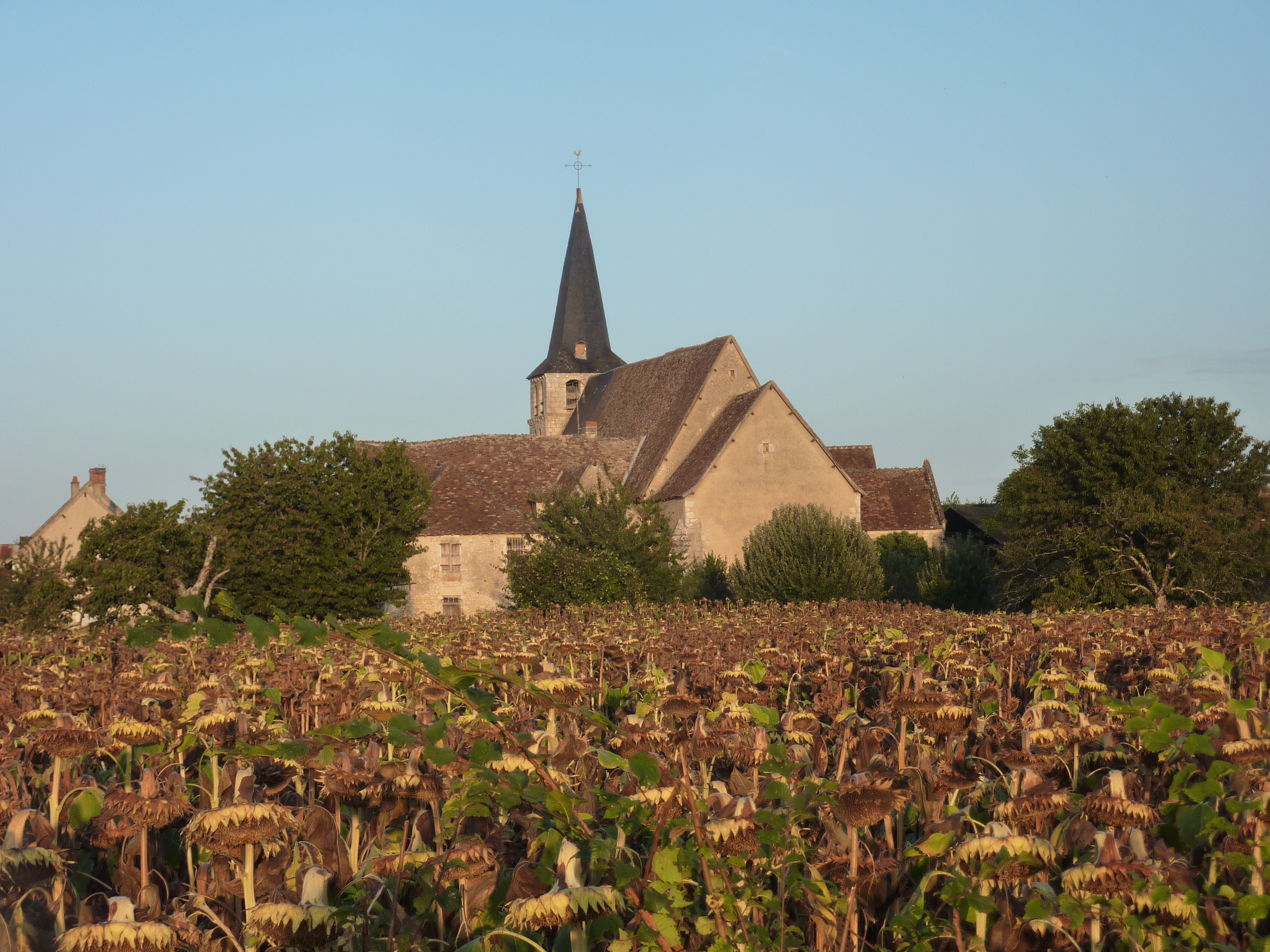
- The church of Saint-Pierre, in Pouligny-Saint-Pierre
- Location of Pouligny-Saint-Pierre
- Location within France Location within Centre-Val de Loire
- Coordinates: 46°40′54″N 1°02′24″E
- Country: France
- Region: Centre-Val de Loire
- Department: Indre
- Arrondissement: Le Blanc
- Canton: Le Blanc
- Intercommunality: Brenne Val de Creuse

Government
  - Mayor (2020–2026): Roland Caillaud
- Area^{1}: 47.45 km^{2} (18.32 sq mi)
- Elevation: 113 m (371 ft)
- Highest elevation: 143 m (469 ft)
- Lowest elevation: 72 m (236 ft)
- Population (2023): 1,023
  - Density: 21.56/km^{2} (55.84/sq mi)
- Time zone: UTC+01:00 (CET)
  - Summer (DST): UTC+02:00 (CEST)
- INSEE/Postal code: 36165 /36300
- ^{1} French Land Register data, which excludes lakes, ponds, glaciers > 1 km^{2} (0.386 sq mi or 247 acres) and river estuaries.

Pouligny-Saint-Pierre (French pronunciation: [puliɲi sɛ̃ pjɛʁ]) is a commune in the Indre department in central France.

The commune is known internationally for its goat's cheese, Pouligny-Saint-Pierre, that was first made in the village in the 19th century.

== Geography ==
The commune is located in the parc naturel régional de la Brenne.

== Population ==
Historical population
Year	Pop.	±% p.a.
1968	1,018	—
1975	972	−0.66%
1982	982	+0.15%
1990	962	−0.26%
1999	974	+0.14%
2007	1,018	+0.55%
2012	1,075	+1.10%
2017	1,069	−0.11%
2023	1,023	−0.73%
Source: INSEE

== See also ==
- Communes of the Indre department
