= Pouligny-Saint-Pierre cheese =

French goat cheese

Pouligny-Saint-Pierre
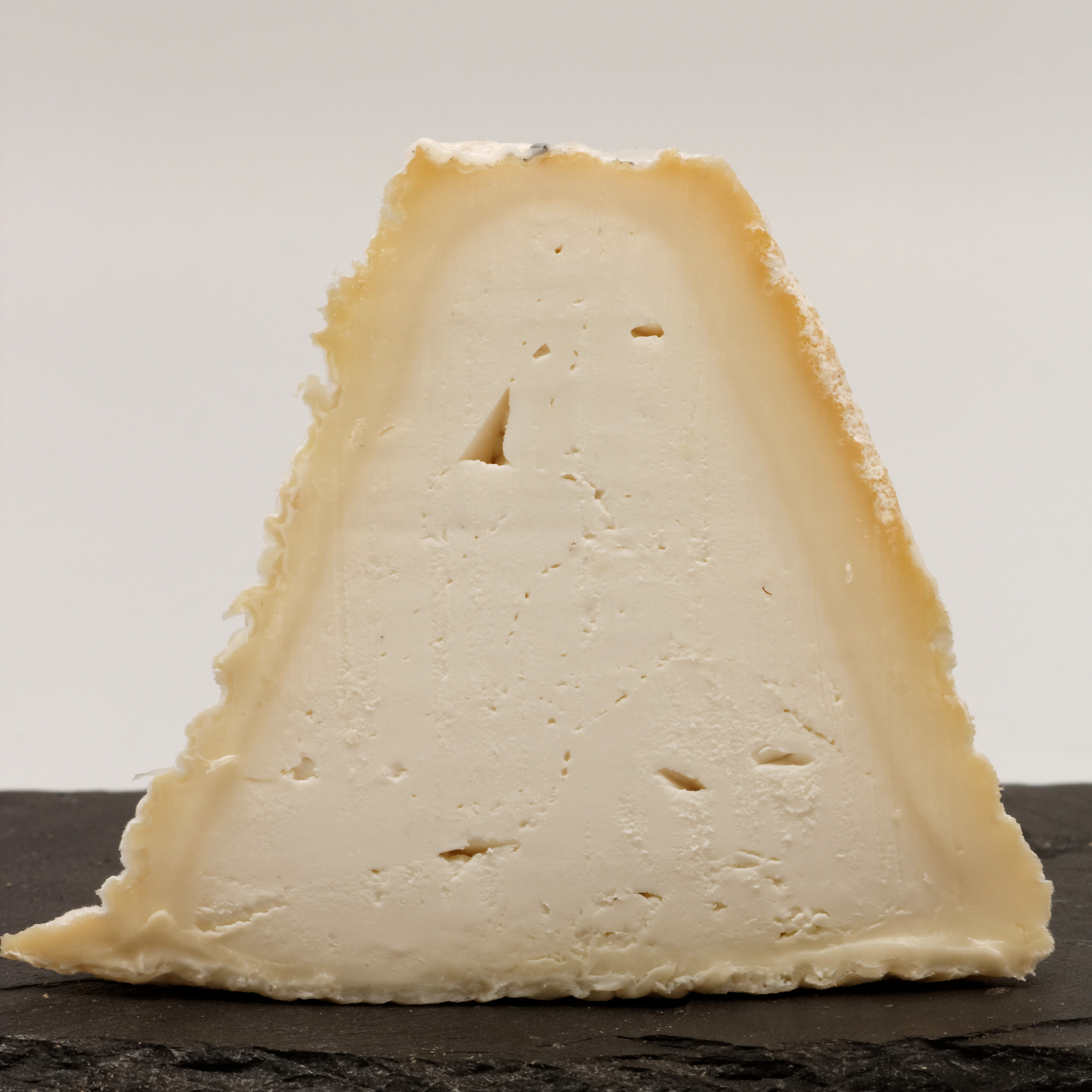
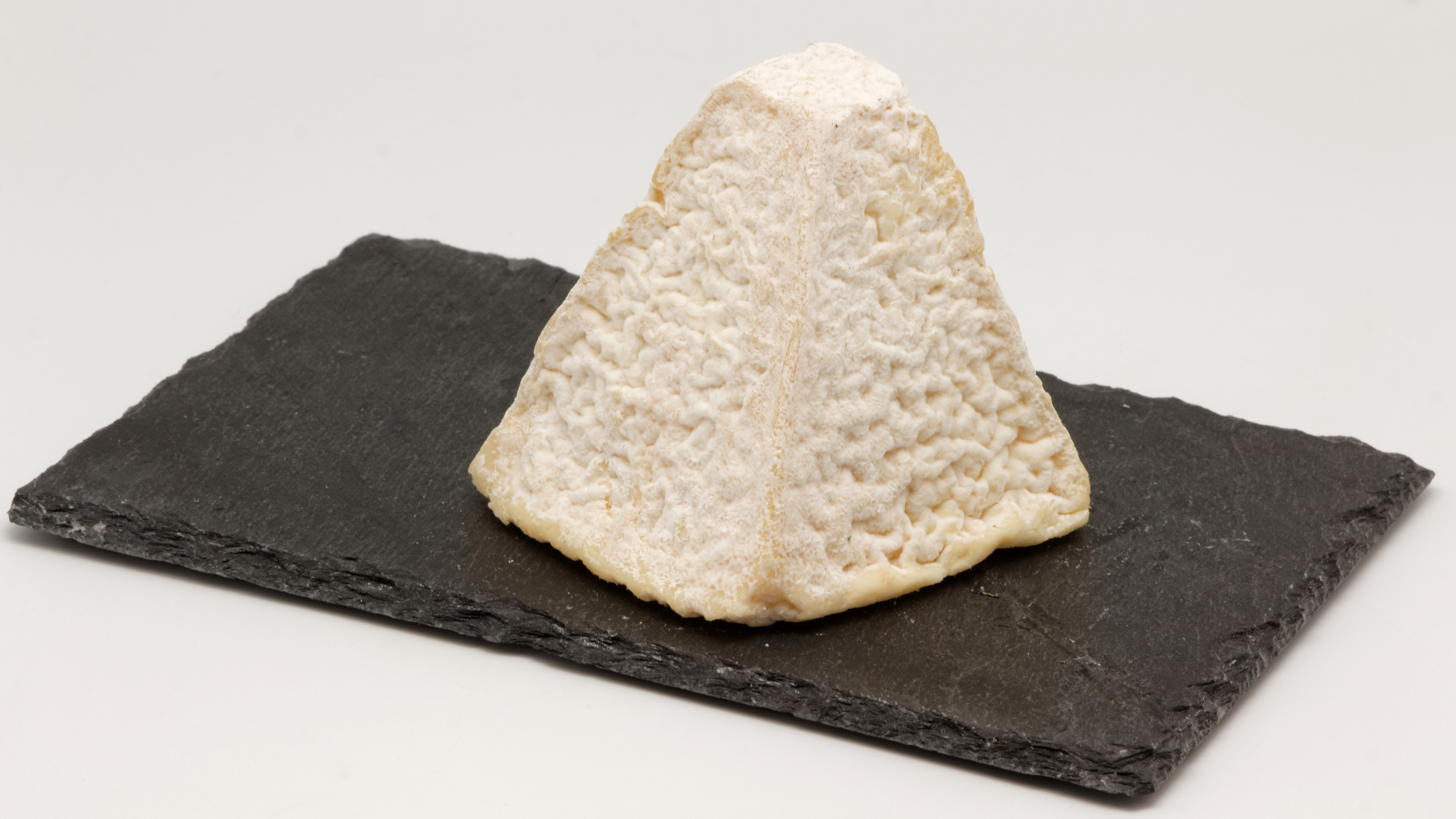
- Pouligny-Saint-Pierre Texture of Pouligny-Saint-Pierre
- Country of origin: France
- Region, town: Berry
- Source of milk: Goats
- Pasteurised: No
- Texture: Soft cheese with natural mould rind
- Aging time: 2-5 weeks
- Certification: French AOC 1976
- Named after: Pouligny-Saint-Pierre

Pouligny-Saint-Pierre (French pronunciation: [puliɲi sɛ̃ pjɛʁ]) is a French goats'-milk cheese made in the Indre department of central France. Its name is derived from the commune of Pouligny-Saint-Pierre in the Indre department where it was first made in the 18th century.

The cheese is distinctive, being pyramidal in shape and golden brown in colour with speckles of grey-blue mould, and is often known by the nicknames "Eiffel Tower" or "Pyramid". It has a square base 6.5 cm wide, is around 9 cm high, and weighs 250 grams (8.8 oz). The central pâte is bright white with a smooth, crumbly texture that mixes an initial sour taste with salty and sweet overtones. The exterior has a musty odour reminiscent of hay.

It is made exclusively from unpasteurised milk. Both fermier (farmhouse) and industriel (dairy) production is used with the fermier bearing a green label, and industriel a red label. Its region of production is relatively small, taking in only 22 communes.

== Manufacture ==
The manufacture is typical of the great goats cheeses of the Loire Valley. The coagulating milk is placed whole into moulds with holes to drain the whey. It is then dried in a well-ventilated cellar with affinage of at least two weeks, although the best examples are left for up to five weeks. Production now occurs all year round although farmhouse manufacturers produce between spring and autumn.

Pouligny-Saint-Pierre received AOC status in 1976. 294 tons were produced in 2005 of which 55% was fermier.

== See also ==
- List of goat milk cheeses
