= List of sheep milk cheeses =

This is a list of sheep milk cheeses. Sheep milk cheese is prepared from sheep milk (or ewe's milk), the milk of domestic sheep. The milk is commonly used to make cultured dairy products, such as cheese.

== Sheep milk cheeses ==
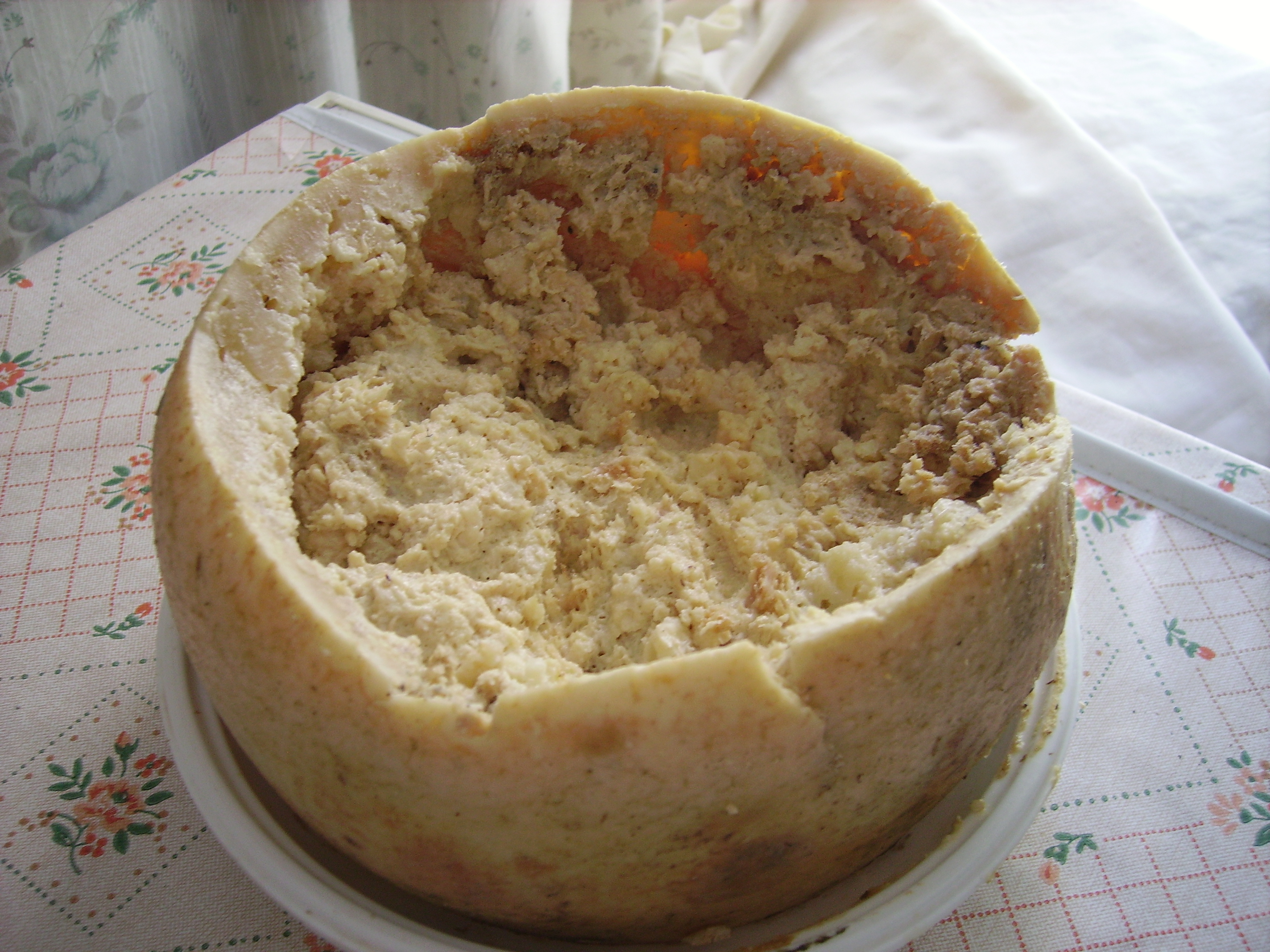
Casu martzu is a traditional Sardinian sheep milk cheese that contains live insect larvae.

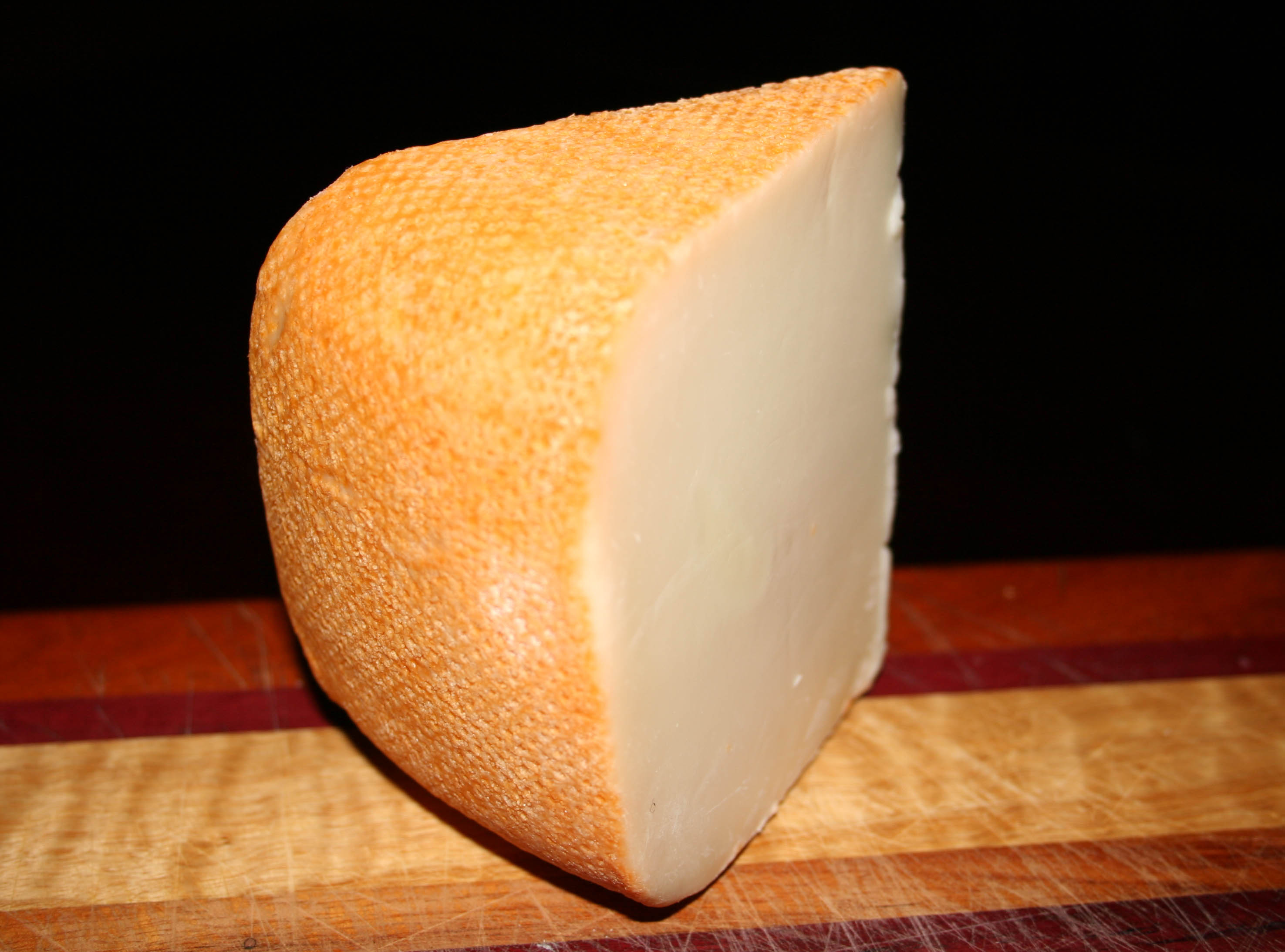
Etorki

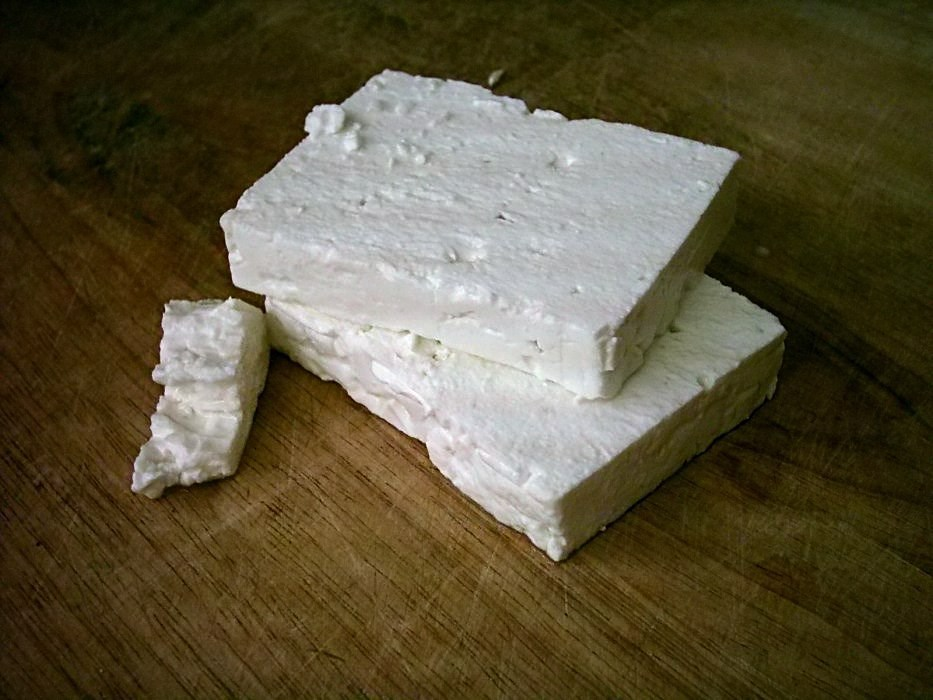
Feta

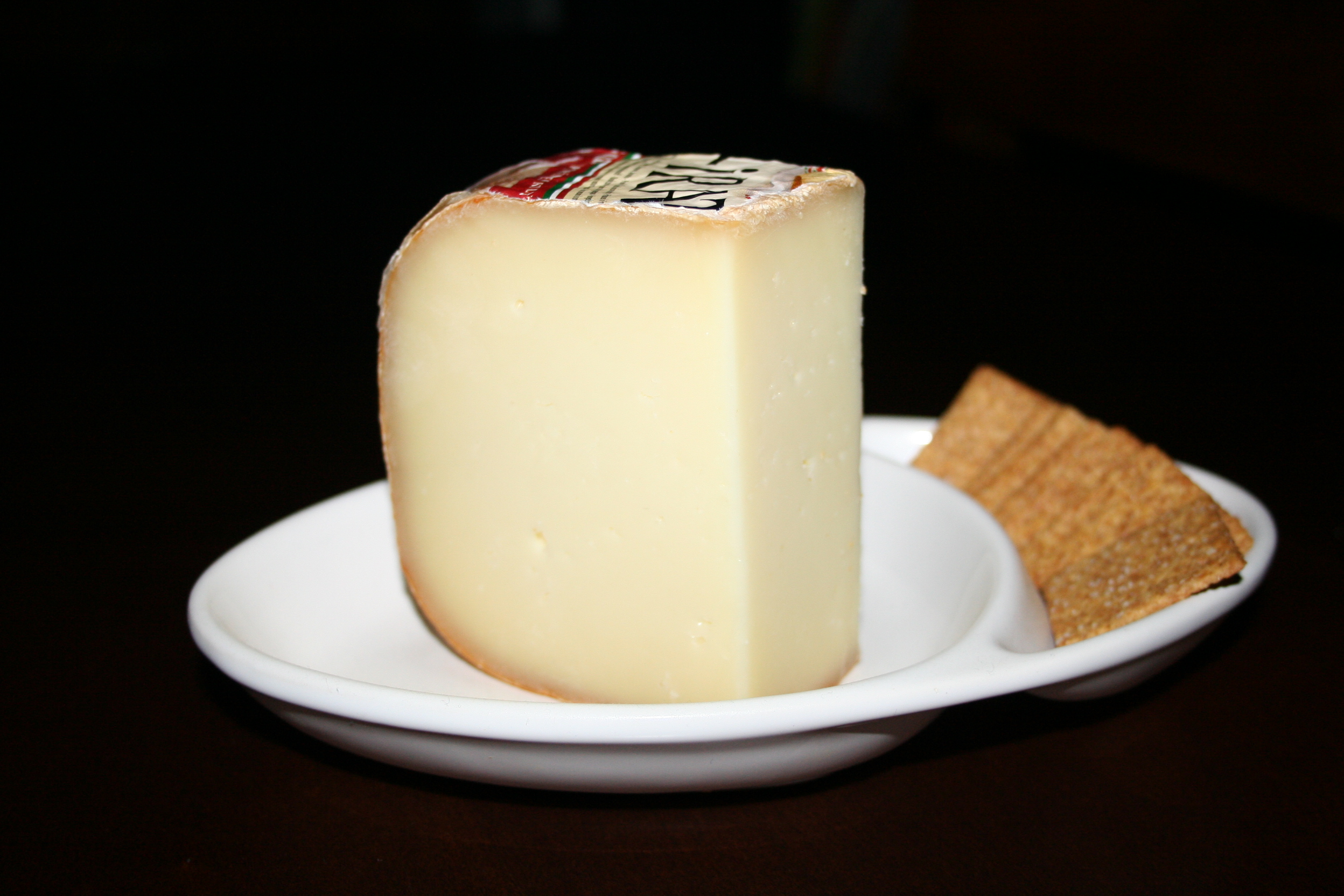
Ossau-Iraty

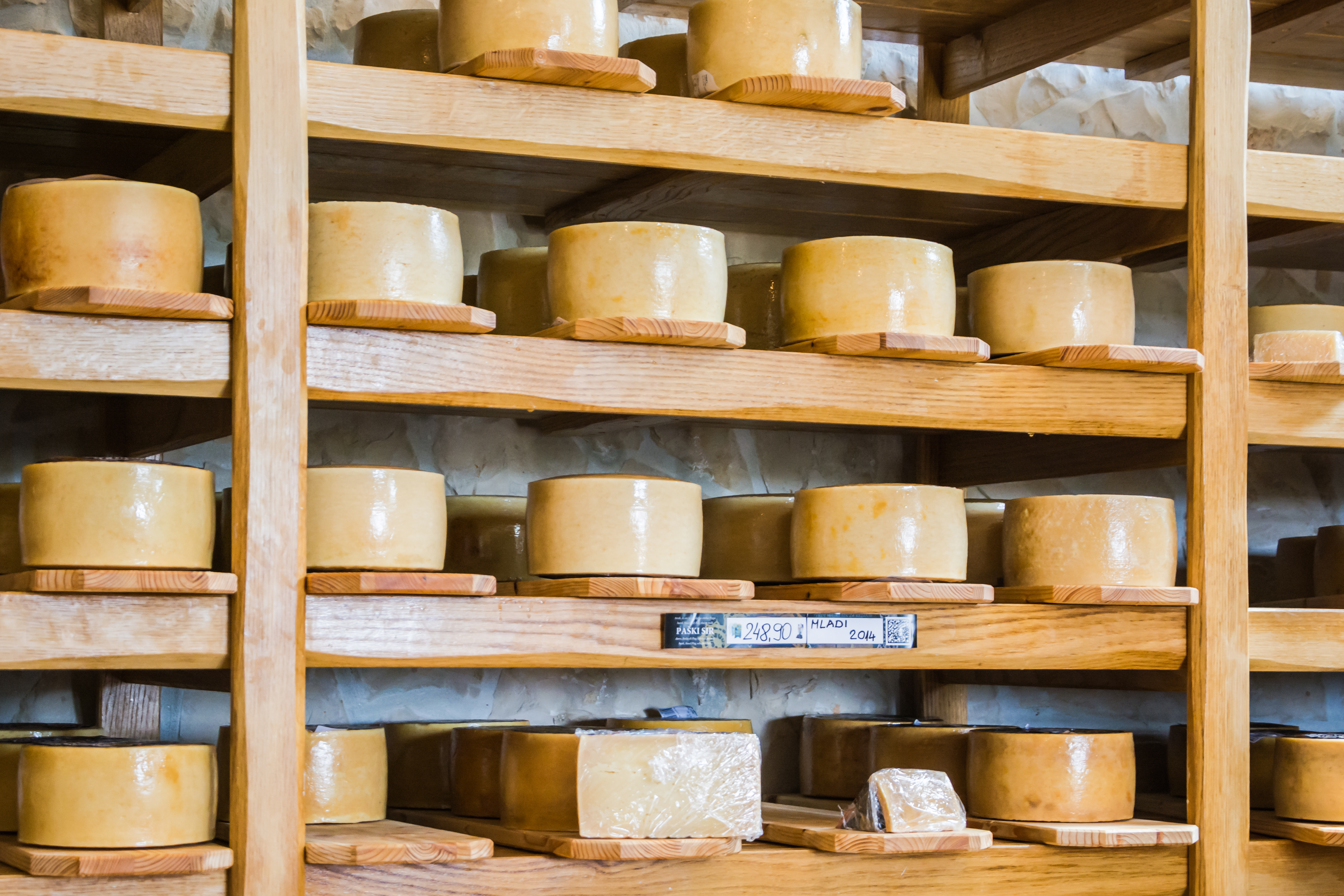
Pag cheese

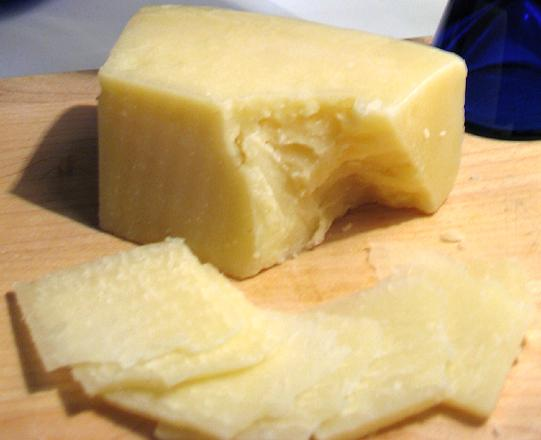
Pecorino romano

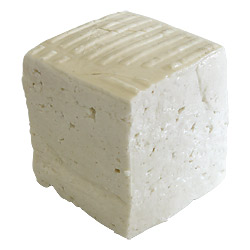
Telemea

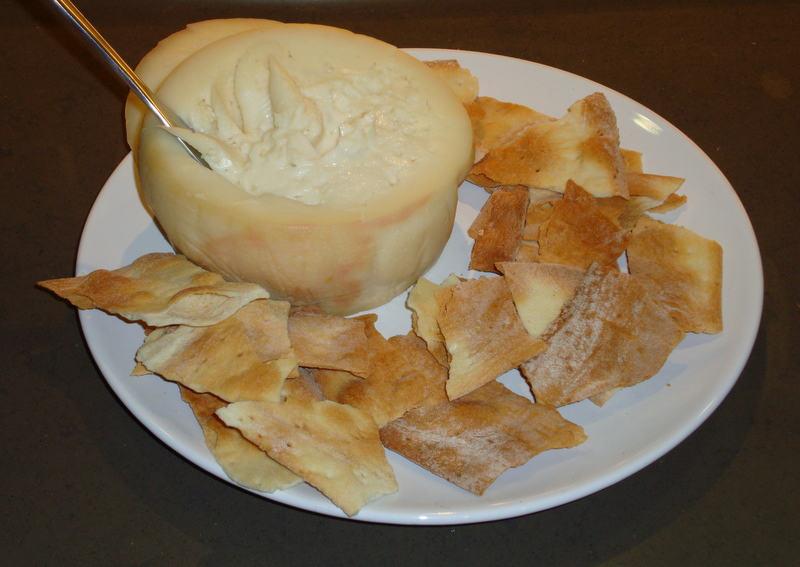
Torta del Casar

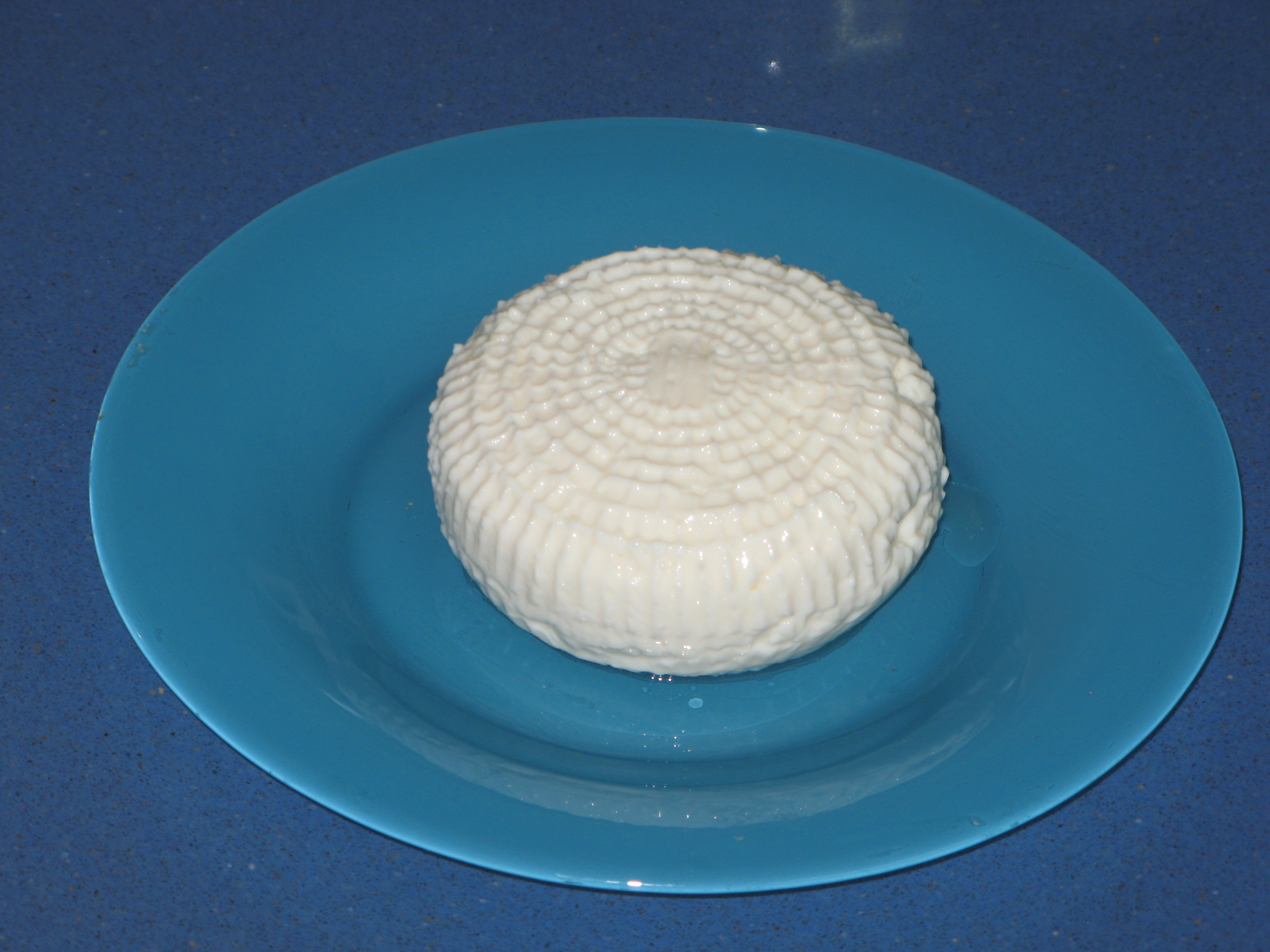
Tzfat cheese

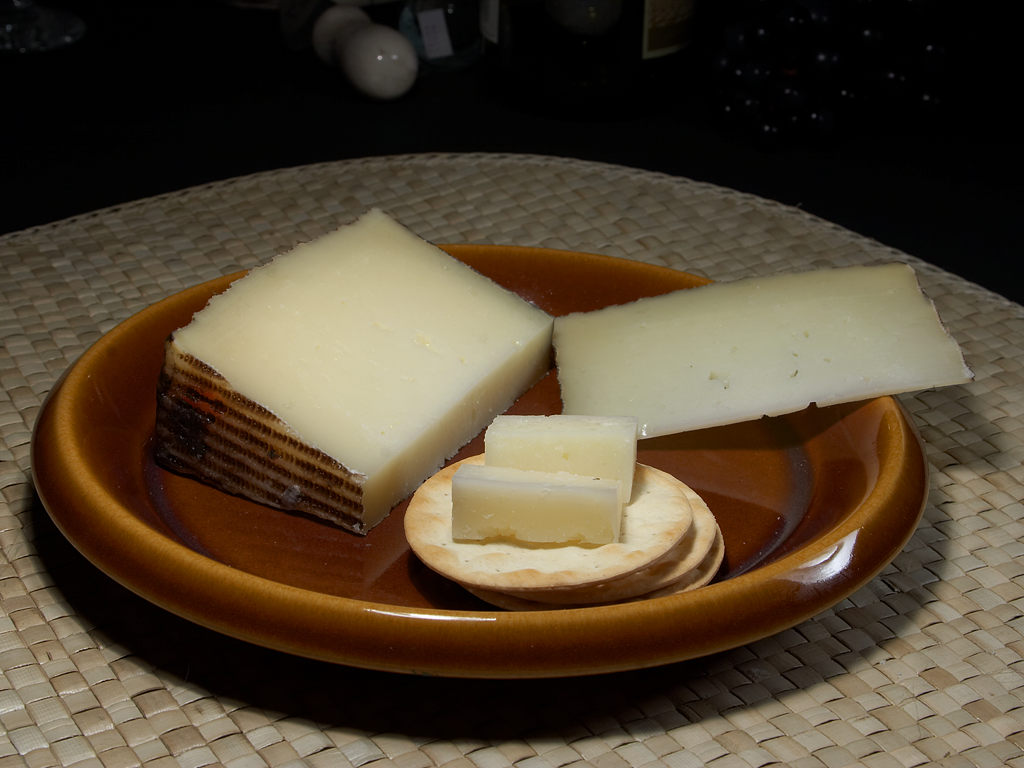
Zamorano cheese

- Abbaye de Belloc
- Abertam cheese
- Anari cheese
- Anthotyros
- Basco-béarnaise
- Beenleigh Blue cheese
- Beyaz peynir
- Brânză de burduf
- Brocciu
- Bryndza
- Bryndza Podhalańska
- Bundz
- Cabrales cheese
- Caciocavallo
- Caciotta
- Caș
- Casciotta d'Urbino
- Castelo Branco cheese
- Casu marzu
- Cazelle de Saint Affrique
- Cherni Vit
- Corleggy Cheese
- Croglin
- Crozier Blue
- Dolaz cheese
- Duddleswell cheese
- Etorki
- Feta
- Fine Fettle Yorkshire
- Ġbejna
- Graviera
- Halloumi
- Idiazabal cheese
- Jibneh Arabieh
- Kadchgall
- Kars gravyer cheese
- Kashkaval
- Kasseri
- Kefalograviera
- Kefalotyri
- La Serena cheese
- Lanark Blue
- Lavaş cheese
- Lighvan cheese
- Manchego
- Manouri
- Mihaliç Peyniri
- Mizithra
- Nabulsi cheese
- Oscypek
- Ossau-Iraty
- Oštiepok
- P'tit Basque
- Paddraccio
- Pag cheese
- Parlick Fell cheese
- Pata de mulo cheese
- Pecorino
- Pecorino di Carmasciano
- Pecorino romano
- Pecorino sardo
- Pecorino siciliano
- Pecorino toscano
- Pepato
- Picón Bejes-Tresviso
- Ricotta
- Robiola
- Roncal cheese
- Roquefort
- Saloio
- Šar cheese
- Serra da Estrela cheese
- Serpa cheese
- Sirene
- Spenwood
- St James
- Sussex Slipcote
- Telemea
- Testouri
- Torta del Casar
- Tzfat cheese
- Van herbed cheese
- Vlašić cheese
- Wensleydale cheese (though most Wensleydale cheese is made from cow's milk)
- Wigmore
- Xynomizithra
- Xynotyro
- Zamorano cheese

== See also ==
- List of cheeses
- List of cheese dishes
- List of dairy products
- List of goat milk cheeses
