= Sheep milk cheese =

Cheese produced with ewe's milk

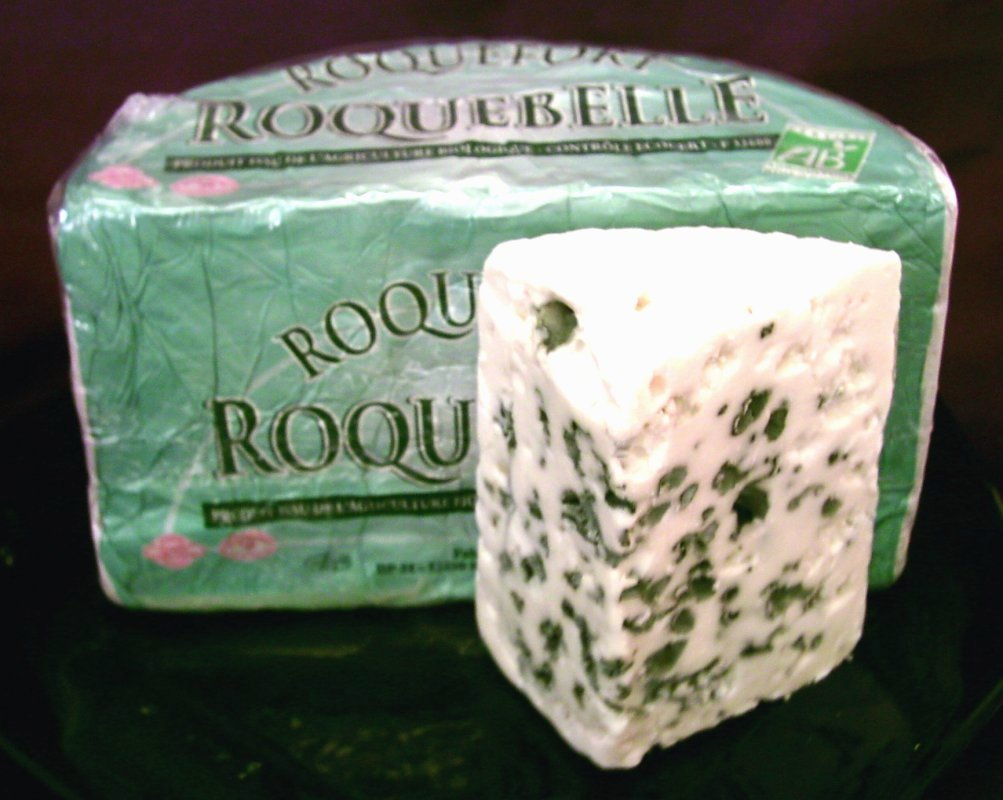
Roquefort

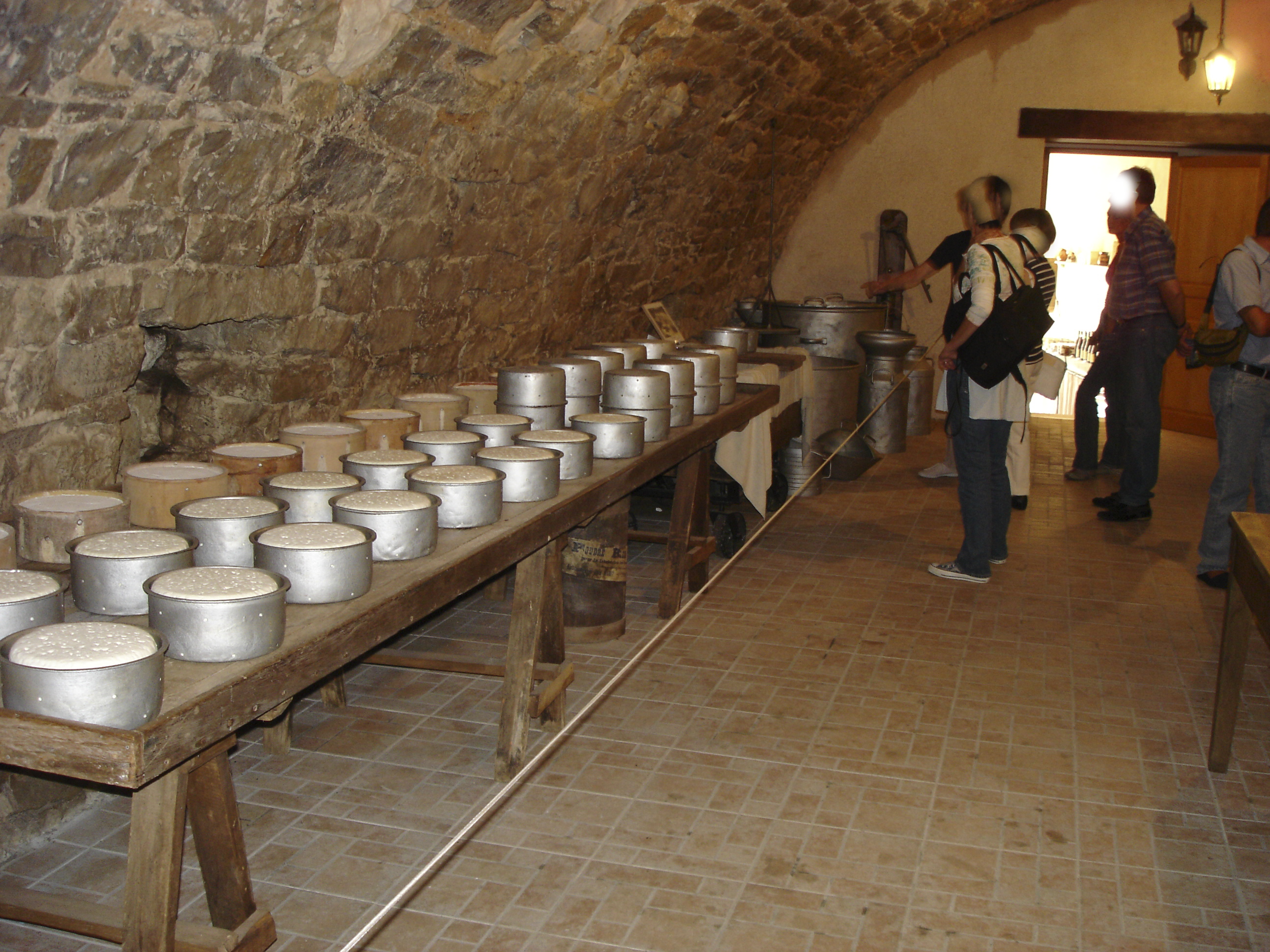
Museum of the traditions of Cornus (Aveyron). The dairy of Roquefort.

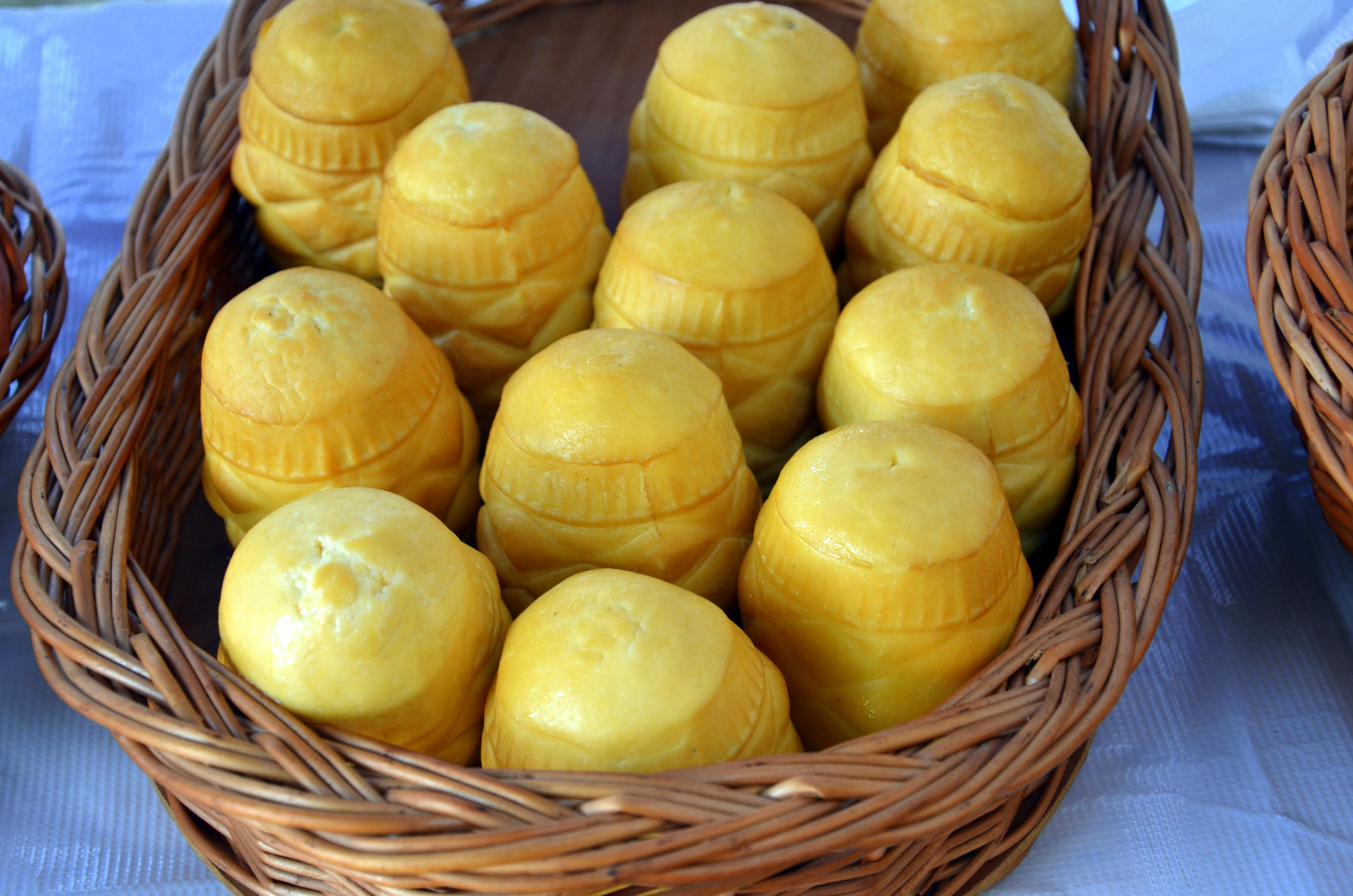
Sheep milk cheeses from Poland

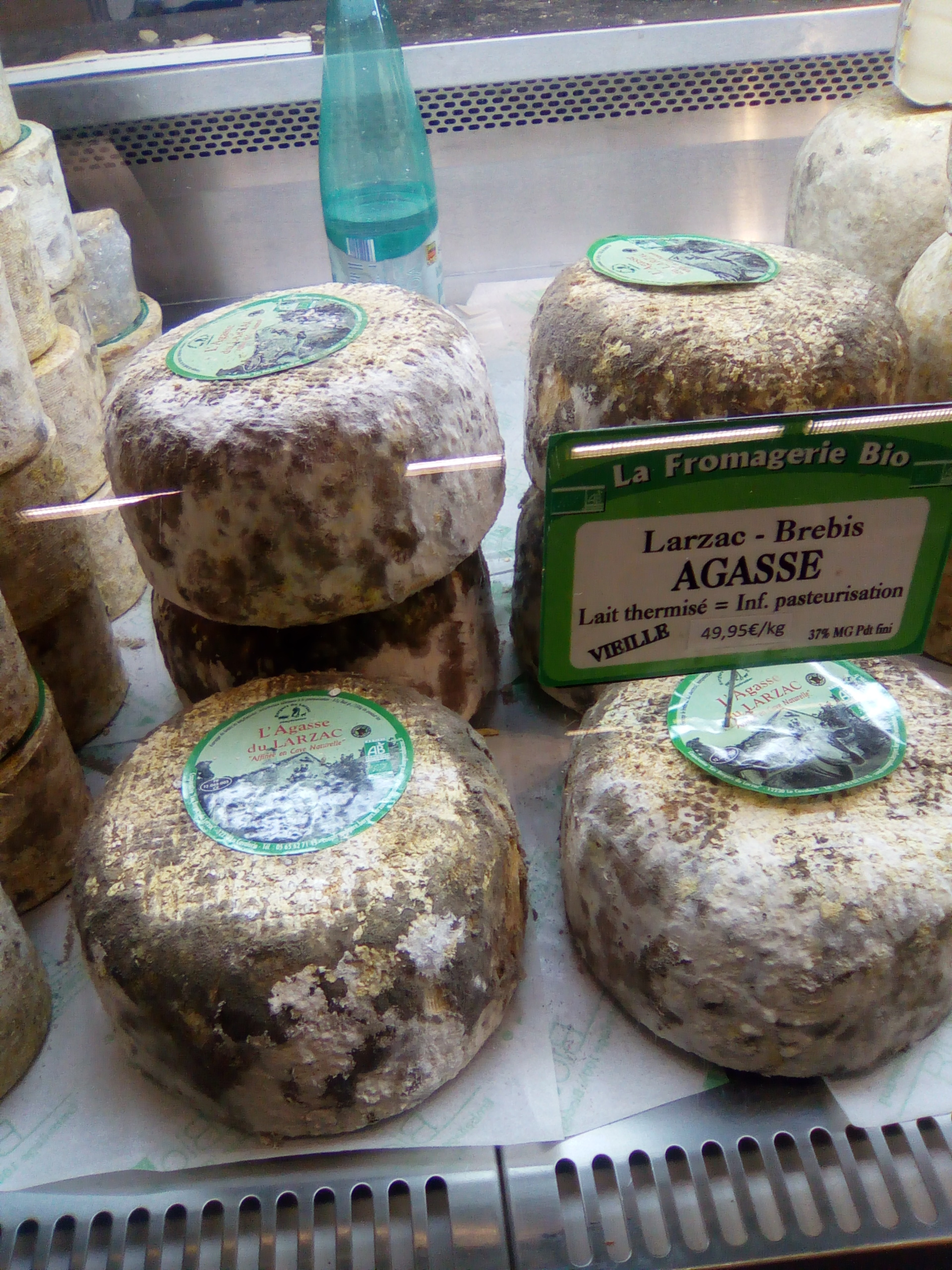
Sheep milk cheeses from France.

Sheep milk cheese is a cheese prepared from sheep milk. Well cheeses made from sheep milk include the feta of Greece, Roquefort of France, manchego from Spain, the pecorino romano and ricotta of Italy. Yogurts, especially some forms of strained yogurt, may also be made from sheep milk.

== Nutrition and production ==
Sheep have only two teats, and produce a far smaller volume of milk than cows. However, as sheep's milk contains far more fat, solids, and minerals than cow's milk, it is ideal for the cheese-making process. It also resists contamination during cooling better because of its much higher calcium content. Sheep milk contains 4.8% lactose, more lactose than cow milk, and is therefore not an alternative for people who are lactose intolerant.

Though sheep's milk may be drunk in fresh form, today it is used predominantly in cheese and yogurt making. Well-known cheeses made from sheep milk include the Feta of Bulgaria and Greece, Roquefort of France, Manchego from Spain, the Pecorino Romano (the Italian word for sheep is pecore) and Ricotta of Italy. Yogurts, especially some forms of strained yogurt, may also be made from sheep milk. Many of these products are now often made with cow's milk, especially when produced outside their country of origin. For the cheese to fully ripen takes at least two weeks; it can take between two and three months, and even up to two years.

== By country ==
=== France ===
French sheep milk cheeses include Abbaye de Bellocq, Brique, Berger de Rocastin, Brebicet, Le Claousou, Lévejac, Valdeblore, Roquefort, Ardi-gasna, Agour, Ossau-Iraty, Brocciu, Asco, Brin d'amour, Faisselle, Fleur de Maquis, A filetta, and Niolo.

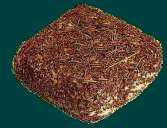
Brin d'Amour

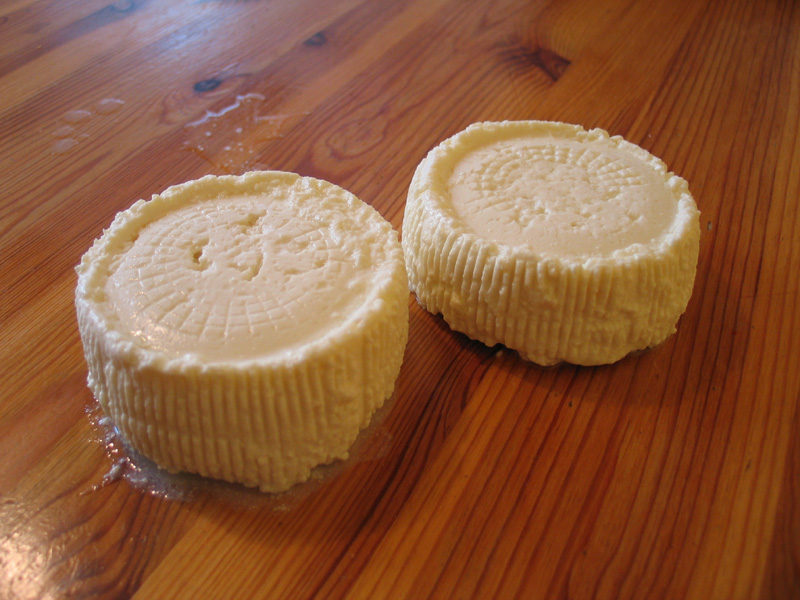
Brocciu

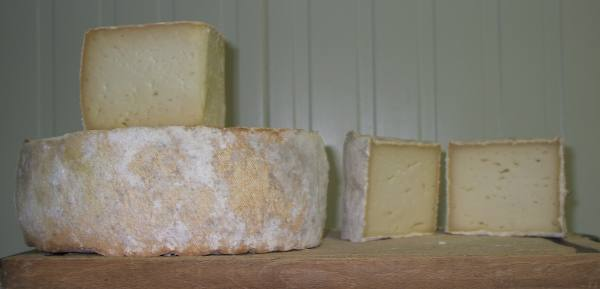
Levejac

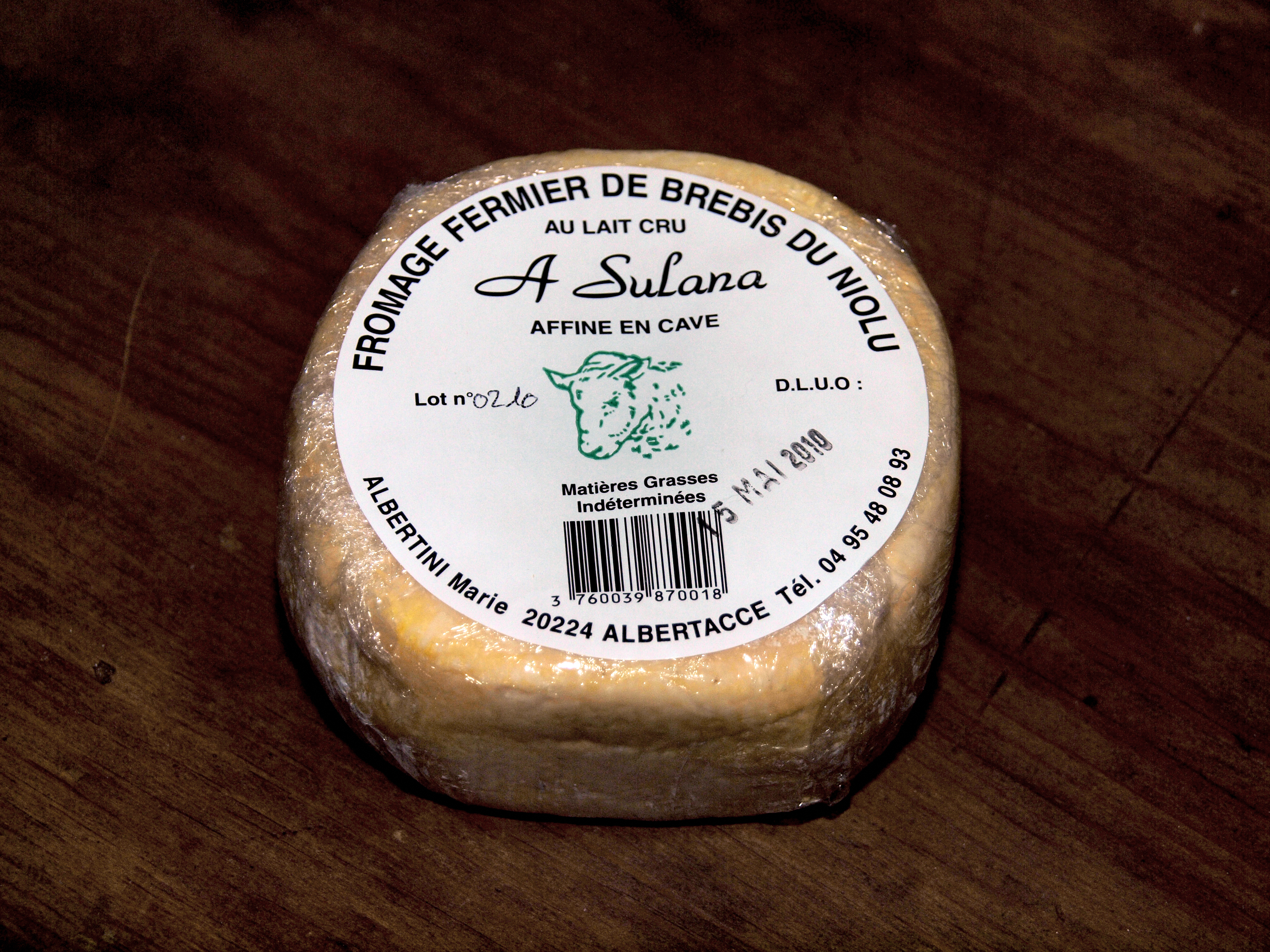
Niolo

=== Cyprus ===
Cypriot sheep milk cheeses include Anari and Halloumi.

=== Greece ===
Greek sheep milk cheeses include Feta and Kefalotyri.

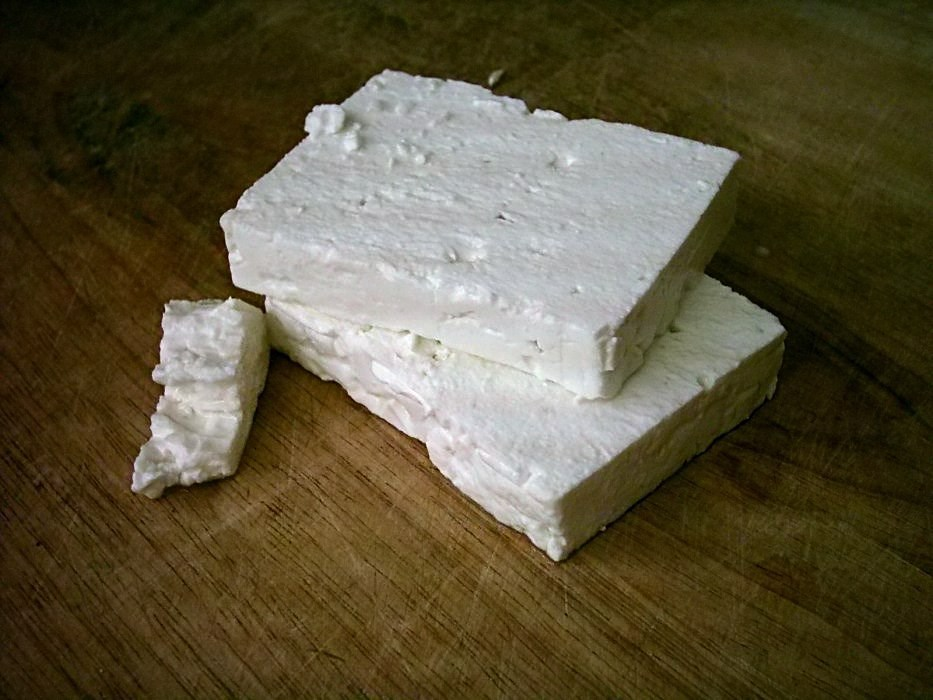
Feta

=== Italy ===
Italian sheep milk cheeses include Pecorino Romano, Pecorino Sardo, Pecorino Siciliano, Pecorino Toscano and Ricotta.

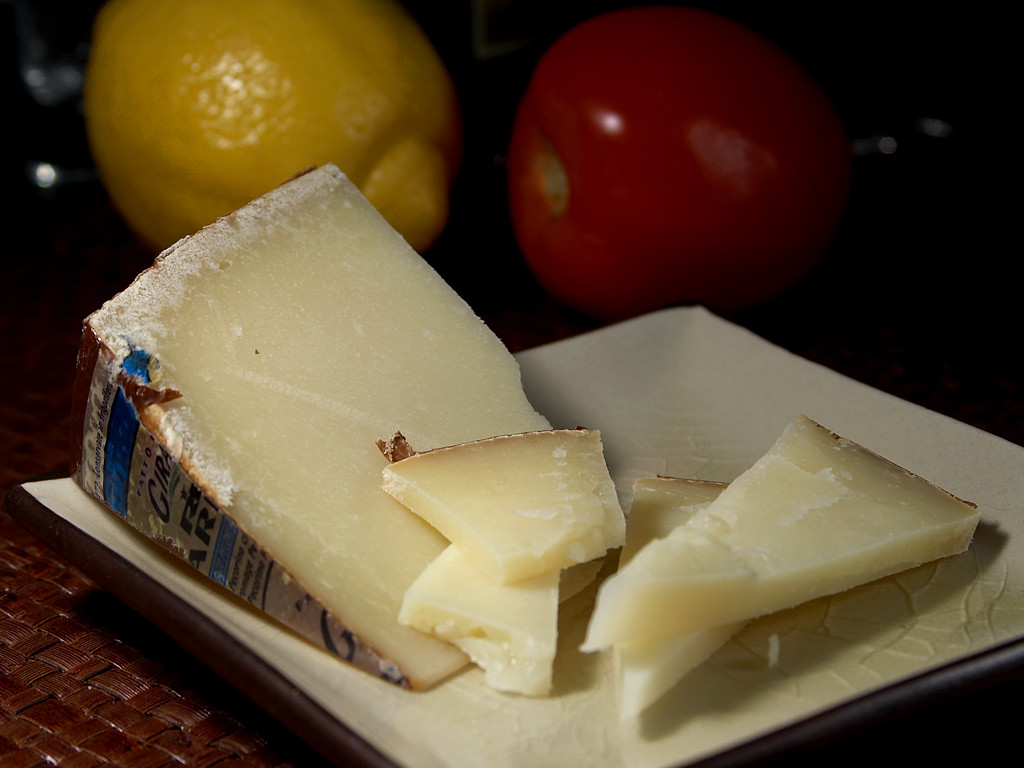
Pecorino Sardo

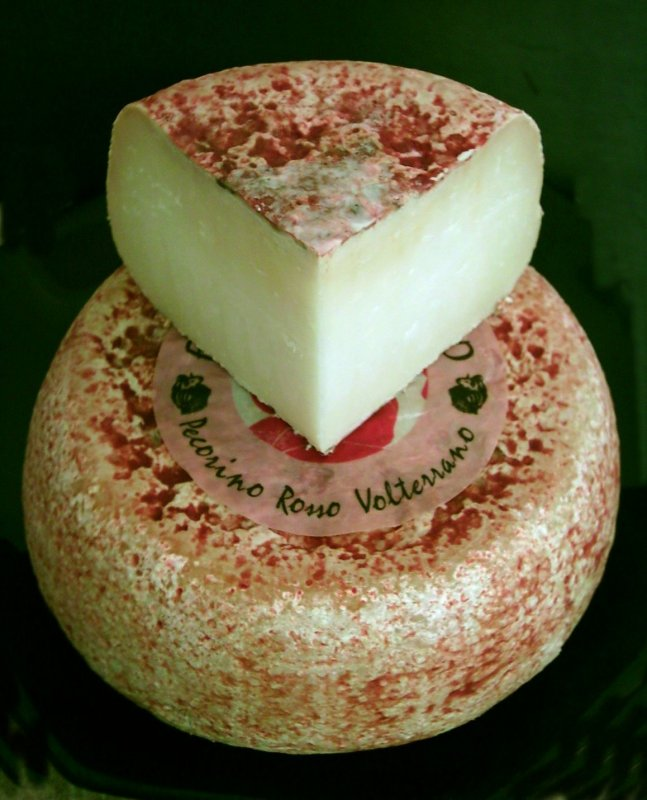
Pecorino Toscano

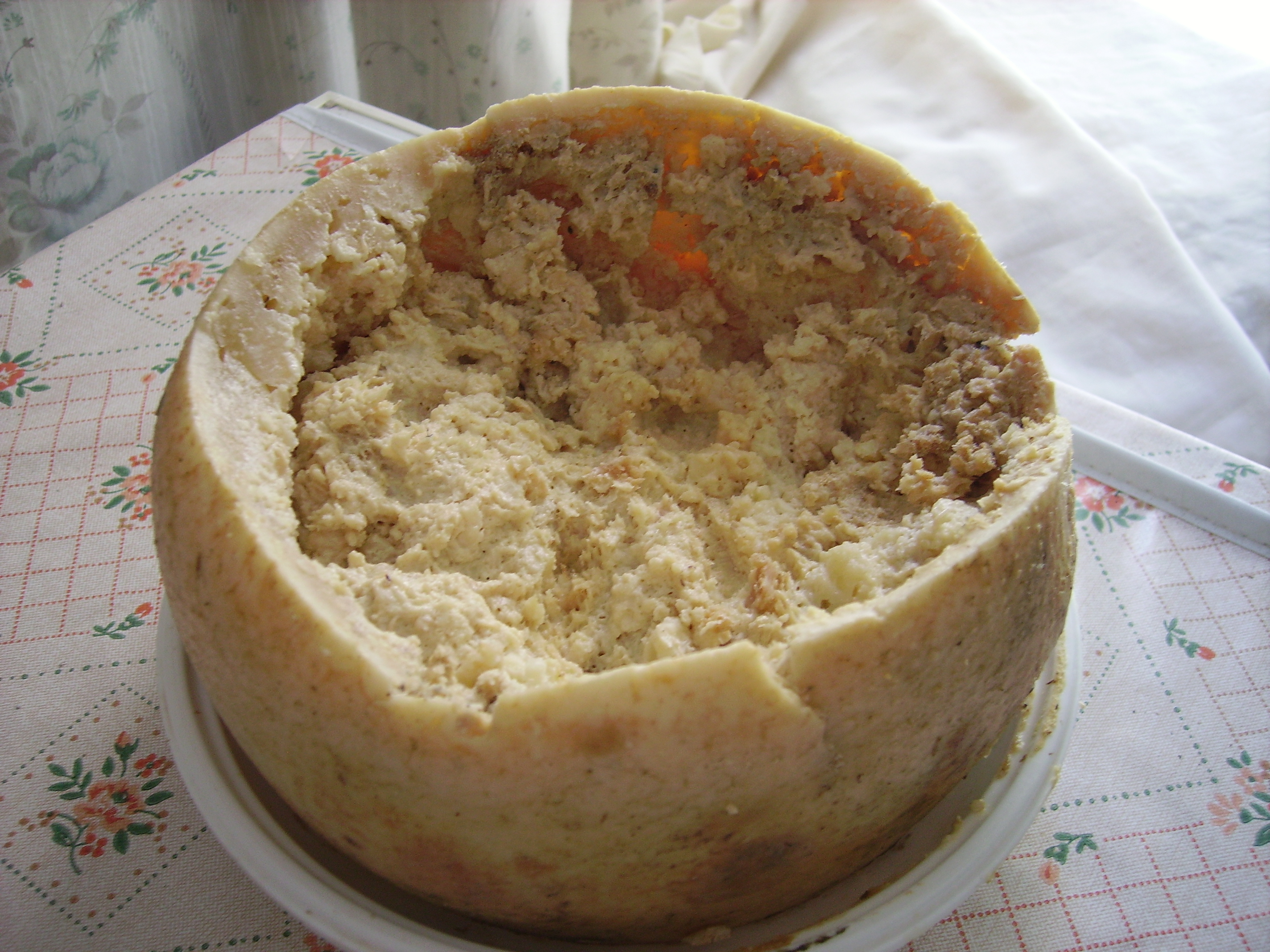
Casu marzu is a traditional Sardinian sheep milk cheese that contains live insect larvae and cheese mites from the cheese flies. A variation of this cheese exists also in Corsica (France), where it is called casgiu merzu and is especially produced in some Southern Corsican villages like Sartene.

=== Croatia ===
Croatian sheep milk cheeses include Pag cheese and Ovidur.

Pag cheese is hard, distinctively flavored sheep milk cheese originating from the Adriatic island of Pag

=== Poland ===
Polish sheep milk cheeses include oscypek and bryndza.

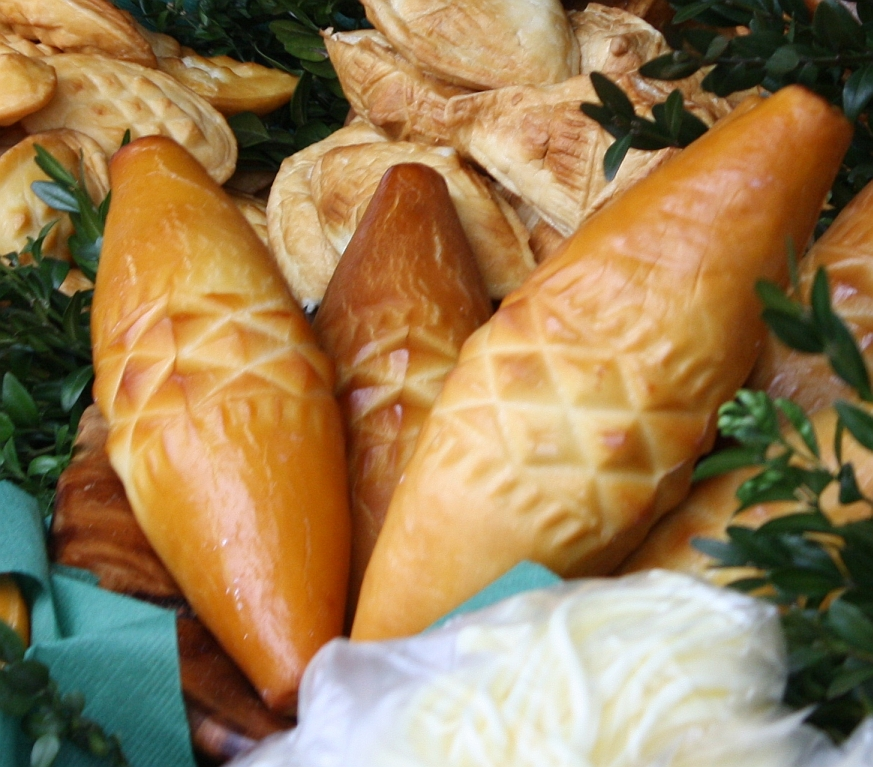
Oscypek cheese.

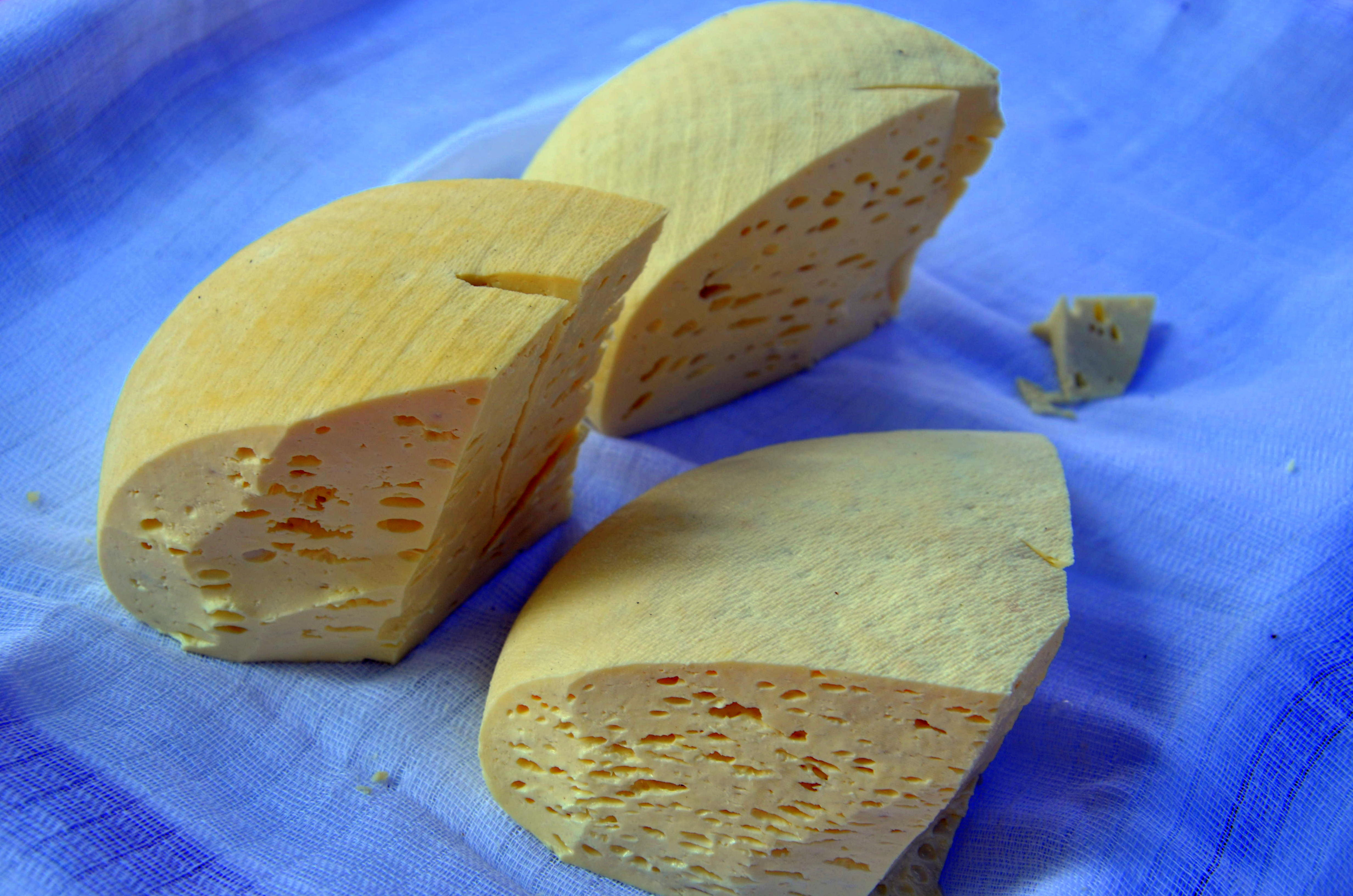
Artisanal sheep's-milk cheeses from the local market, made by sheepherders in Poland

=== Portugal ===
Portuguese sheep milk cheeses include Castelo Branco, Azeitão, Rabaçal, Saloio, Serpa and Serra.

=== Spain ===
Among the very many cheese varieties in Spain made from sheep's milk and protected by the Protected Designation of Origin (PDO) there is Roncal, made in the Roncal Valley; Idiazabal cheese, made in both Basque Country and Navarre regions from Latxa and Carranzana sheep's milk; Torta del Casar, made in Extremadura region from Merino sheep's milk; Manchego cheese, made in La Mancha region from Manchega sheep's milk.

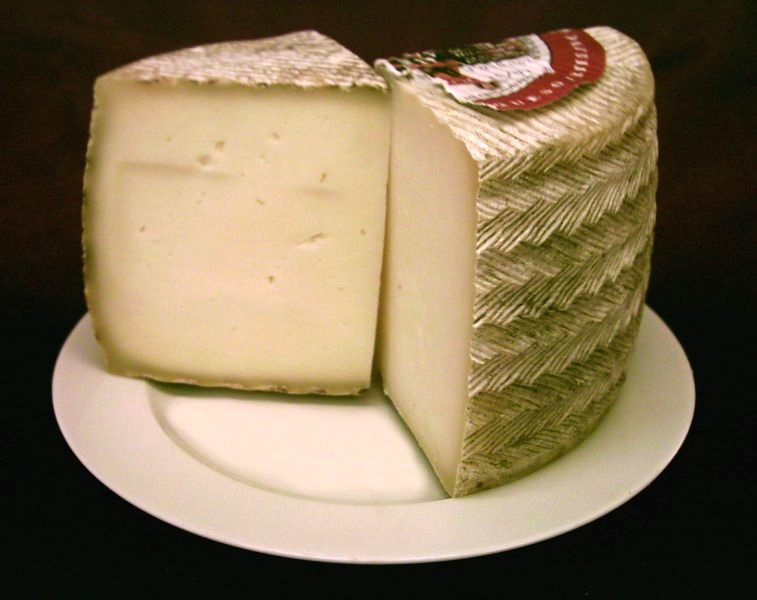
Manchego

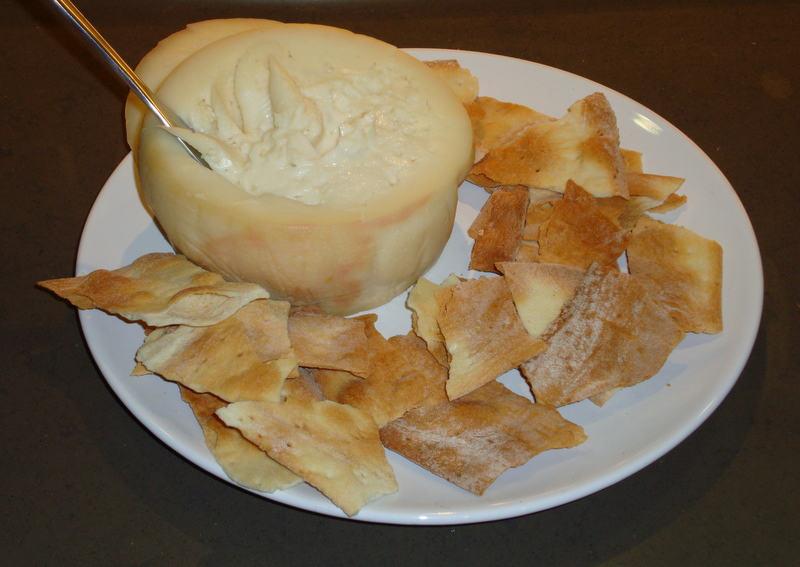
Torta del Casar served with biscuits

=== Hungary ===
Hungary produces Parenyica, a sheep's milk cheese described as lightly smoked rolled cheese usually made from ewe's milk, but also from cows milk; surrounded by an edible cheese twine.

In the Northern region of Hungary another ewes milk cheese, Gomolya is made and it is allowed to ripen outside in the sun for 3 weeks while slung in cheesecloth under an open-roofed shelter. It will develop a stronger flavour when allowed to mature on wooden boards. p218.

=== Denmark ===
Danish sheep milk cheeses includes Mønsk Mangcego and salad cheeses and white cheeses.

=== Ukraine ===
Ukrainian sheep milk cheeses includes bryndza and feta, salad cheeses and white cheeses.

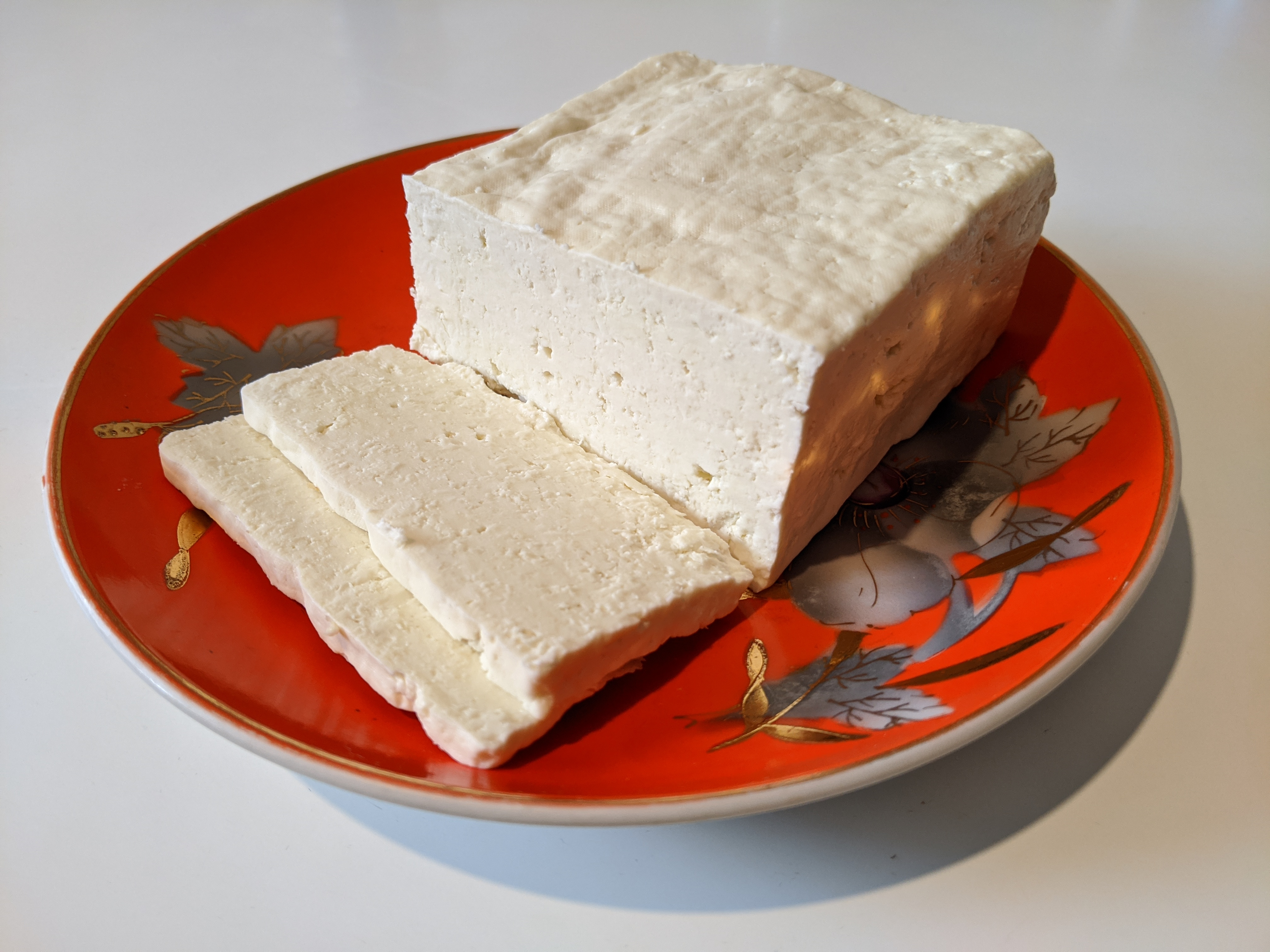
Aged Bessarabian sheep milk bryndza from a market in Izmail

== See also ==
- List of sheep milk cheeses
- List of cheeses
