= Zamorano cheese =

Spanish sheep's milk cheese

Zamorano
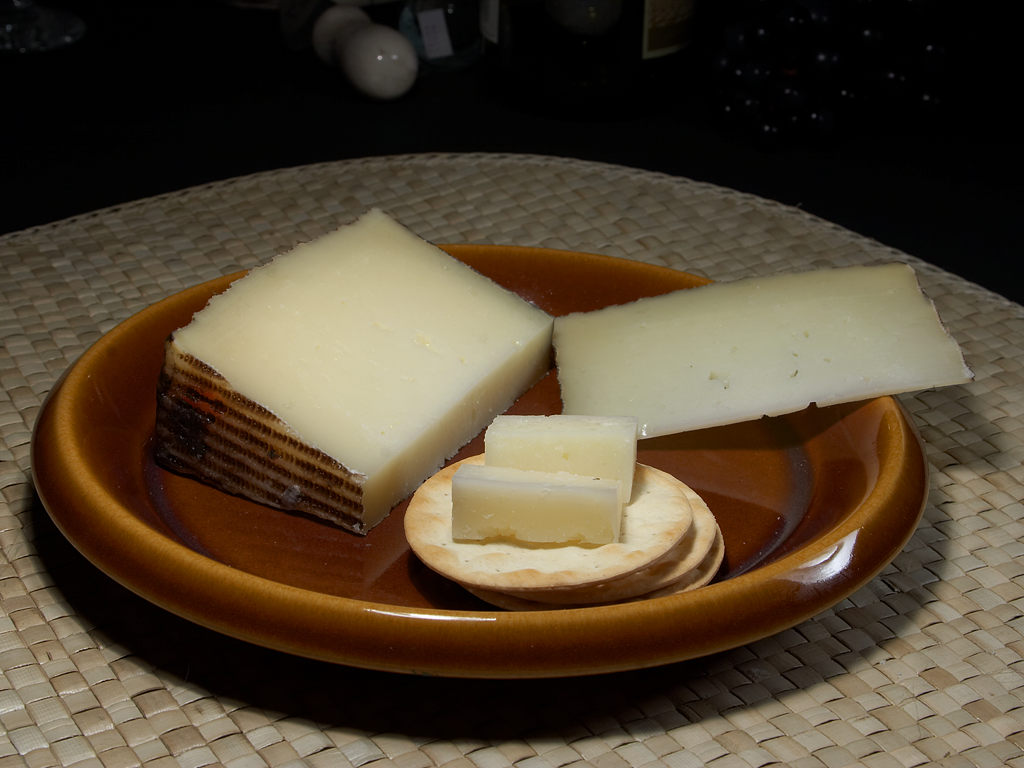
- Country of origin: Spain
- Source of milk: sheep
- Texture: Hard
- Weight: 11 kg (24 lb)
- Certification: PDO

Zamorano (Spanish: Queso zamorano) is a sheep's milk cheese made in the province of Zamora, Spain. This is a hard cheese which is typically aged about 6 months. The cheeses are turned often and rubbed with olive oil, giving the cheese its characteristic dark color. This cheese owes its flavor character to the breed of sheep, the "small, scruffy" Churra and the Castilian sheep, predominant in the region, to the cold and humid climate conditions, and to its long aging in cellars.

== Features ==
Zamorano has a "very creamy, sweet, savory flavor", with "a hint of piquancy". Others describe it as hearty and nutty. The shape is cylindrical with "a distinctive zigzag pattern" on the rind similar to Castellano or Manchego, which it resembles in taste also. The size is approximately 11 kg (24 lb).

Zamorano cheese is protected by its Denominación de Origen, which specifies its production, ingredients, and maturation.

== History ==
Cheese is one of the oldest foods in the human diet. Its elaboration in the province of Zamora could begin with the beginning of the cattle activity of its first sedentary settlers. Vestiges of this cheese tradition are the encellas from the Bronze Age that are preserved in the Museum of Zamora, used to mold and drain the cheese.

This craft tradition was maintained over the centuries in the province of Zamora. References to its history are the treaty of Columella that, at the time of Roman domination, informs about the usual procedures for the elaboration and conservation of cheese. Subsequently, continuous references to this product are detected in the different jurisdictions and municipal ordinances of the Zamora populations, in which rules are not only established on the sale of cheese, but also on its preparation. There are also references in feudal agrarian contracts, in which the delivery of cheese is usually contemplated as part of the personal benefits that the vassal has with his lord.

The references to the cheese also continue in the books in which the payments for tithes to the different churches, bishoprics and monasteries of the province of Zamora are recorded. Of special mention in this matter are the monastic foundations of Santa María de Moreruela and San Martín de Castañeda.

The cadastre of the Marqués de la Ensenada (1752), also includes continuous references to the cattle herd and the production of cheese in the different towns of Zamora. It is also cited in the municipal accounts for festivals and tributes to illustrious people in the cities of Zamora, Benavente and Toro, sometimes with mentions of a cheese in the format of a cupcake.

All these historical references lead to a long-standing pastoral tradition and the consequent historical tradition in cheese making in the province of Zamora, both preserved today in most of its towns. The quality of the milk obtained from the native sheep breeds and the careful elaboration of the Zamorano cheese, has been the seed of its historical recognition and renown at a national level, being currently one of the most demanded products in the province of Zamora.

== See also ==
- List of cheeses
- List of sheep milk cheeses
