= Mihalić =

Mihalić or Mihalich may refer to:

== People ==
- Franjo Mihalić (1920–2015), Yugoslav and Croatian long-distance runner
- Herman Mihalich (1930–1997), American politician
- Irene Mihalic (born 1976), German politician
- Joe Mihalich (born 1956), American college basketball coach
- John Mihalic (1911–1987), American baseball player
- Marcello Mihalich, also spelled Mihalić (1907–1996), Italian football player and coach

== See also ==
- Mihalich, Haskovo Province, a village in Bulgaria
- Mihaliç (disambiguation)
