= Torta del Casar =

Cheese made of sheep milk in Spain

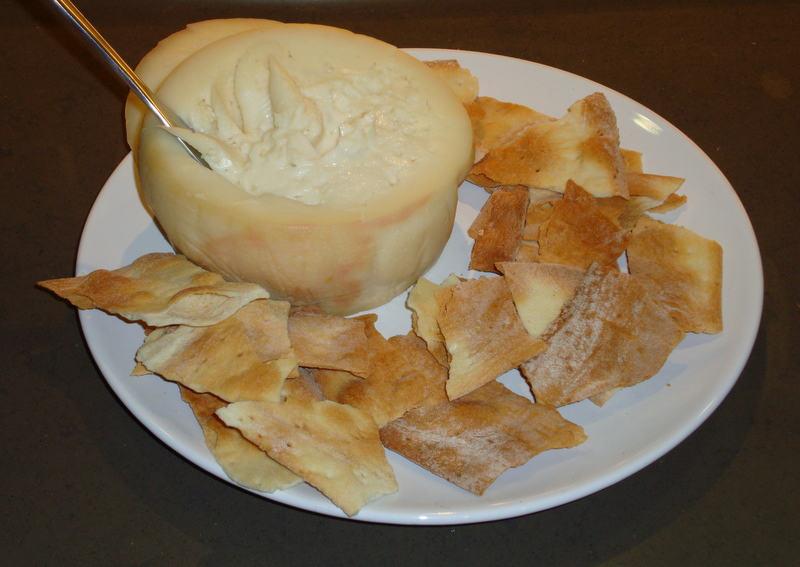
- Country of origin: Spain
- Region, town: Casar de Caceres, Caceres
- Region: Extremadura
- Source of milk: Sheep
- Pasteurised: No
- Texture: Semi-hard
- Aging time: 60 days minimum
- Certification: protected-origin status 2003
- Named after: Casar de Cáceres

Torta del Casar (Extremaduran: Torta del Casal) is a cheese made from sheep's milk in the Extremadura region of Spain. It is named after Casar de Cáceres, its city of origin. The milk is curdled using a coagulant found in the pistils of the cardoon, a wild thistle. This ingredient lends a subtle bitterness to the otherwise rich and slightly salty-tasting cheese. It is aged for at least sixty days. The fully ripe cheese has a creamy consistency in the center, and is traditionally eaten by slicing off the top and scooping out the inside.

In 1999, the cheese was given protected-origin status, regulations that stipulate not only where it can be produced, but also that it can only be made with the milk of Merino and Entrefina sheep. These breeds have a low yield of milk, and it takes the milk of 20 sheep to make a 1 kg (2.2 lb) wheel of Torta del Casar.

== See also ==
- List of cheeses
- List of sheep milk cheeses
