= Etorki =

French cheese

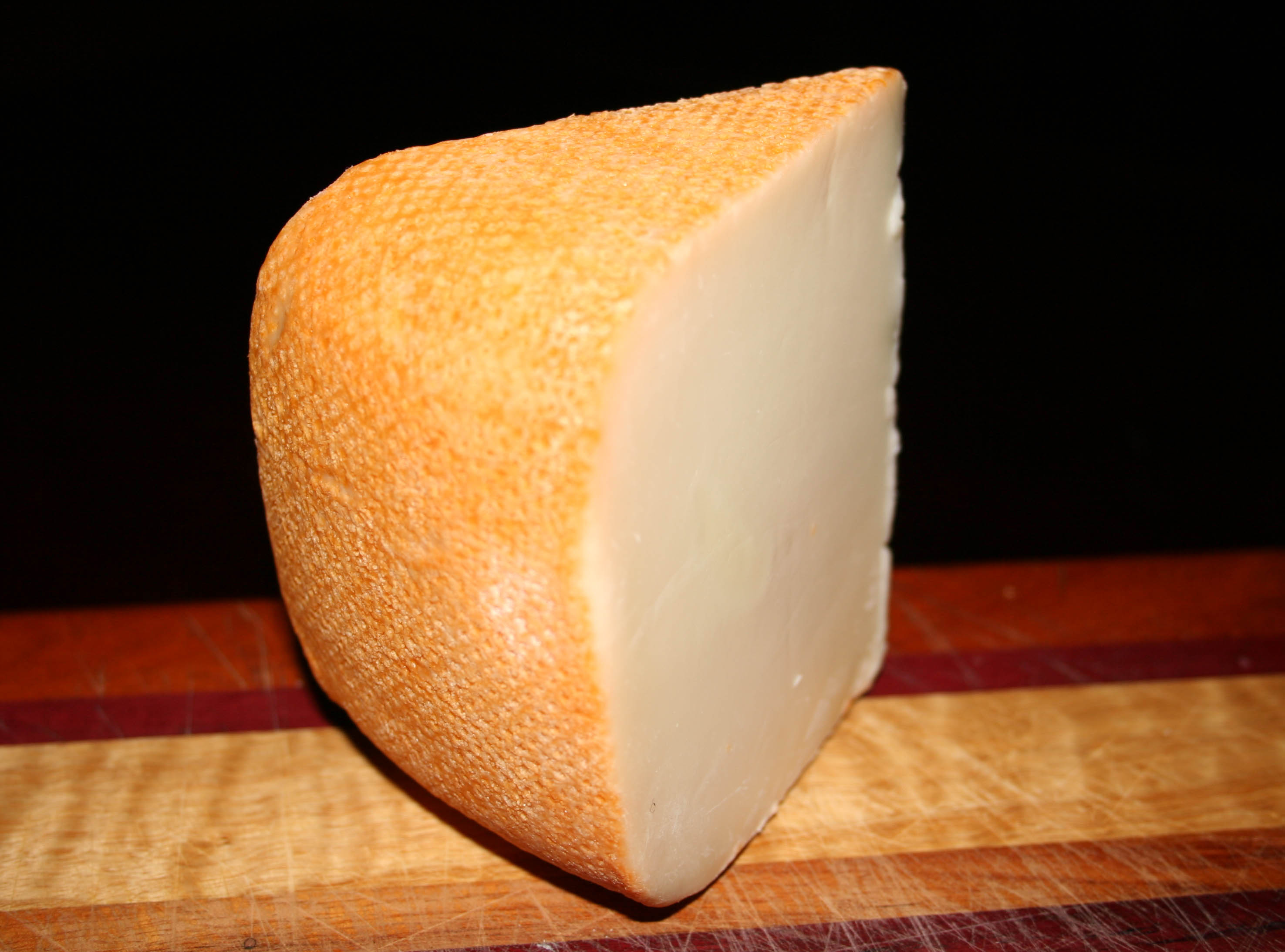
- Country of origin: France
- Region: Basque country
- Town: Mauléon-Licharre, Pyrénées-Atlantiques
- Source of milk: sheep
- Dimensions: 25 cm (diameter) x 11 cm (height)
- Aging time: 7 weeks

Etorki is a firm cheese made in the French Basque country, at Mauléon-Licharre in the Pyrénées-Atlantiques department. It is made from pasteurized sheep milk and pulp pressed, not cooked, then matured for seven weeks.

Etorki is produced in ten-inch by four-inch cylinders weighing ten pounds. Cheese critics describe Etorki as "smooth, supple, and velvety."

== See also ==
- List of sheep milk cheeses
