= AD Casar de Cáceres =

Spanish football club

Casar de Cáceres
- Full name: Agrupación Deportiva Casar de Cáceres
- Founded: 2003
- Dissolved: 2014
- Ground: Estadio Municipal, Casar de Cáceres, Extremadura, Spain
- Capacity: 400
- 2013–14: Regional Preferente – Group 1, 15th of 16
Home colours	Away colours

Agrupación Deportiva Casar de Cáceres was a Spanish football team based in Casar de Cáceres, in the autonomous community of Extremadura. Founded in 2003 and dissolved in 2014, it last played in Regional Preferente – Group 1, and held home games at Estadio Municipal de Casar de Cáceres.

== Season to season ==
Season	Tier	Division	Place	Copa del Rey
2008–09	6	1ª Reg.	3rd	
2009–10	6	1ª Reg.	9th	
2010–11	6	1ª Reg.	2nd	
2011–12	5	Reg. Pref.	11th	
2012–13	5	Reg. Pref.	5th	
2013–14	5	Reg. Pref.	15th	
