= Mihaliç =

Mihaliç can refer to:

- Mihaliç Peyniri, an aged sheep's milk cheese from Turkey
- Old name of Karacabey, a town in northwestern Turkey

== See also ==
- Mihalić
- Mihalıççık, town in central Turkey
