= Testouri =

Egyptian sheep or goat cheese

- Country of origin: Egypt
- Pasteurised: No
- Texture: Soft

Testouri is a cheese made from sheep milk or goat milk. It is often shaped like an orange, and is eaten fresh and lightly salted. Testouri cheese is popular in North Africa and the Near East. Testouri is popular in East Africa and was introduced by the Ottomans after the 15th century.

== See also ==
- List of cheeses
