= Abbaye de Belloc =

French-Basque semi-hard cheese

Abbaye de Bellocq
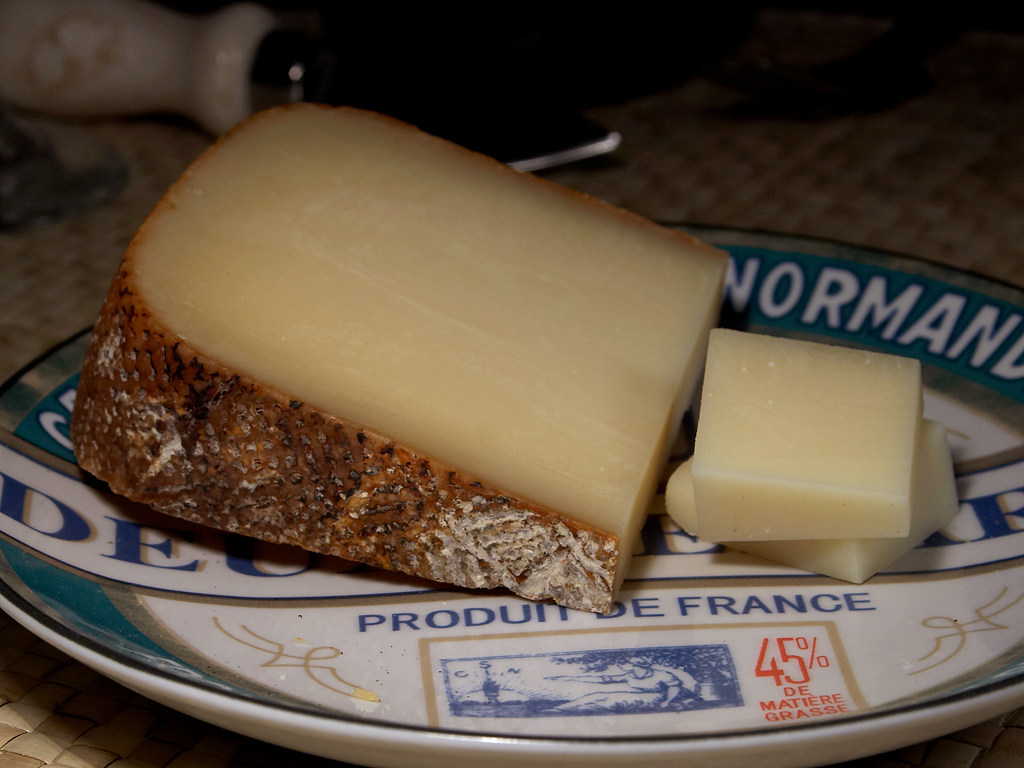
- Abbaye de Bellocq cheese
- Country of origin: France
- Region: Pays Basque
- Source of milk: sheep milk
- Pasteurised: No
- Texture: Dense, rich, creamy
- Fat content: 60%

Abbaye de Belloc (Occitan: Abadiá de Belloc; Basque: Belokeko Abadia) is a French Pyrenees semi-hard cheese from the Pays Basque region, made from unpasteurized sheep milk.

Production of this Ossau-Iraty cheese is regulated by A.O.C. laws.

== History ==
Abbaye de Belloc is believed to have been first made by the Benedictine monks of the Abbaye Notre-Dame de Belloc, of southwestern France, who passed the recipe onto shepherds from the Basque region. A recipe suggests this cheese has a history of at least 3,000 years. These monks continue to make the cheese traditionally today.

== Production ==
Abbaye de Belloc is produced from the milk of a centuries-old breed of red-nosed Manech ewes particular to the Basque region, delivered by farms neighboring Belloc Abbey. Production of this cheese varies, but possible ingredients including bacterial culture, salt, and animal rennet. The cheese is made into wheels weighing 5 kg with a natural, crusty, brownish colored rind with patches of red, orange and yellow. Abbaye De Belloc is aged for 6 weeks to 6 months in cool, humid locations to develop its flavor.

== Flavor and texture ==
Abbaye de Belloc has a pleasantly nutty and complex flavor that is characteristic of Basque. It has a dense, rich, semi-dense creamy texture and a distinctive lanolin aroma. Careful attention under the correct maturing conditions accentuates this cheese's rich, caramelized flavors, which sometime resemble burnt caramel. It pairs particularly well with Pinot Noir, as it is mild enough not to overwhelm the subtleties of this delicate varietal, but also has sufficient complexity to stand up to the bolder flavors of a Syrah/Shiraz.
