= Abertam cheese =

Czech cheese

- Country of origin: Czech Republic
- Region: Karlovy Vary Region
- Town: Abertamy
- Source of milk: Sheep
- Texture: Hard
- Fat content: 45%
- Aging time: 2 months

Abertam is a traditional Czech farmhouse hard cheese made from sheep milk. It has the shape of an irregular ball with thin yellow to orange natural rind. It is typically used as a table cheese or for melting.

Abertam is made in Karlovy Vary, a famous spa town. The natural pastures of this mountainous part of Bohemia provide the sheep with a rich diet that is revealed in the robust flavour of the hard pressed cheese. The cheese ripens in two months.

== See also ==
- List of cheeses
