= Castelo Branco cheese =

Portuguese goat or sheep cheese

Castelo Branco
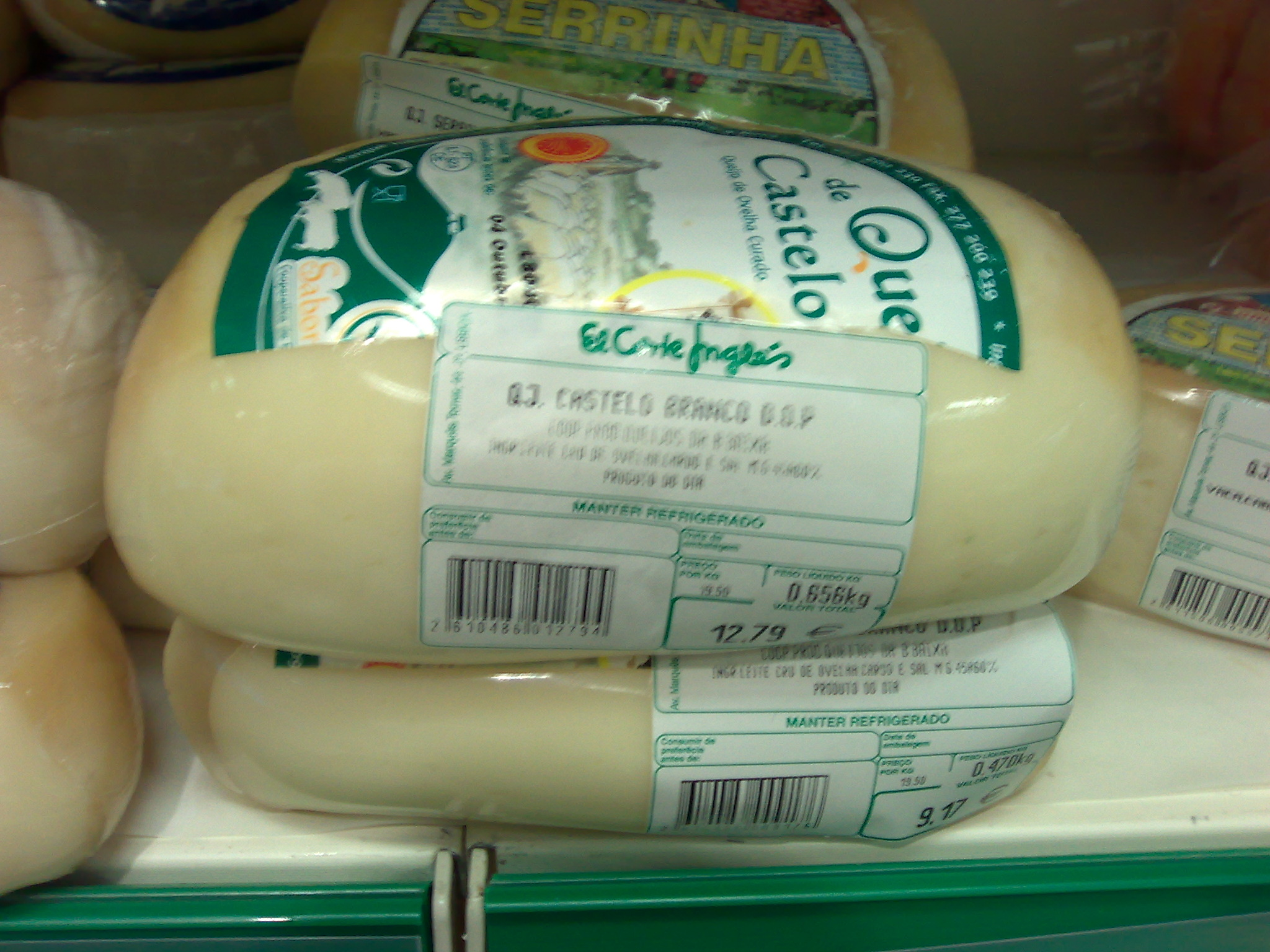
- Other names: Queijo de Castelo Branco
- Country of origin: Portugal
- Source of milk: Goats, ewes
- Texture: Semi-soft
- Certification: PDO 1996

Castelo Branco (Portuguese: Queijo de Castelo Branco) is a cheese named after the city of the same name in Portugal, the main city of the district where it is produced.

Since 1996, Castelo Branco cheese has had a Protected designation of origin (PDO), being one of the three Beira Baixa cheeses (PDO) (Portuguese: Queijos da Beira Baixa DOP).

The cheese is made from goat or sheep milk, and has a soft texture. Typically, the cheese takes 40 days to mature when made with goat's milk, and 50 days when made with ewe's milk. The fat content is around 45% and the cheese is usually a close-to-white colour.

== See also ==
Cheeses sometimes also known as Castelo Branco cheese:

- Beira Baixa yellow cheese (Portuguese: Queijos Amarelo Beira Baixa DOPP)
- Beira Baixa spicy cheese (Portuguese: Queijos Picante da Beira Baixa DOP)
- List of Portuguese cheeses with protected status
