= Bryndza Podhalańska =

Sheep's milk cheese from Podhale, Poland

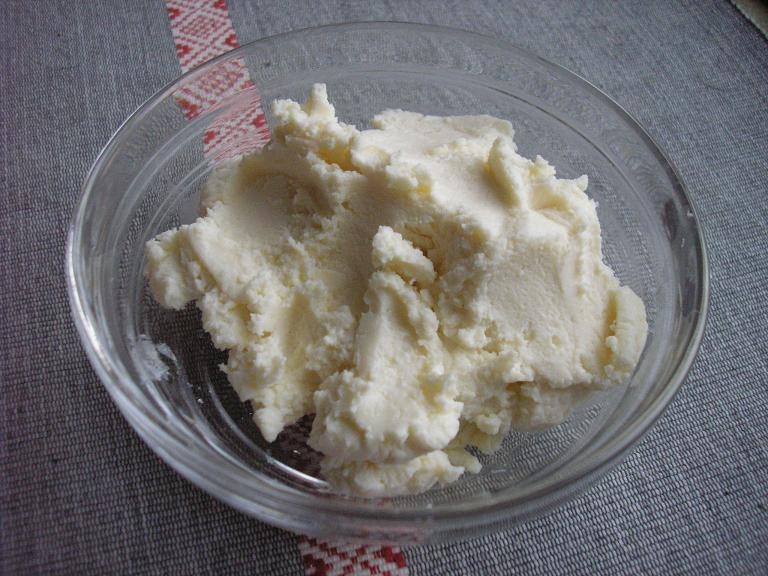
Bryandza cheese in a glass bowl

Bryndza Podhalańska is a Polish variety of the soft cheese Bryndza, from the Podhale region, it is made from sheep's milk.

It has a geographical indication under EU law, with PDO status.

== See also ==
- Bryndza Podhalańska in Poland Language
