= Kadchgall =

Pashtun cheese

Kadchgall is a hard cylindrical cheese that originated from the Pashtuns of Pakistan and Afghanistan. The cheese generally tastes very sweet and is also a little bit salty. For better taste, the cheese is popularly made of sheep milk, although camel milk can also be used, which is then clotted with yogurt. The cheese is normally yellowish and white in colour, and kind of rubbery.
