= Ossau-Iraty =

French cheese made from sheep milk

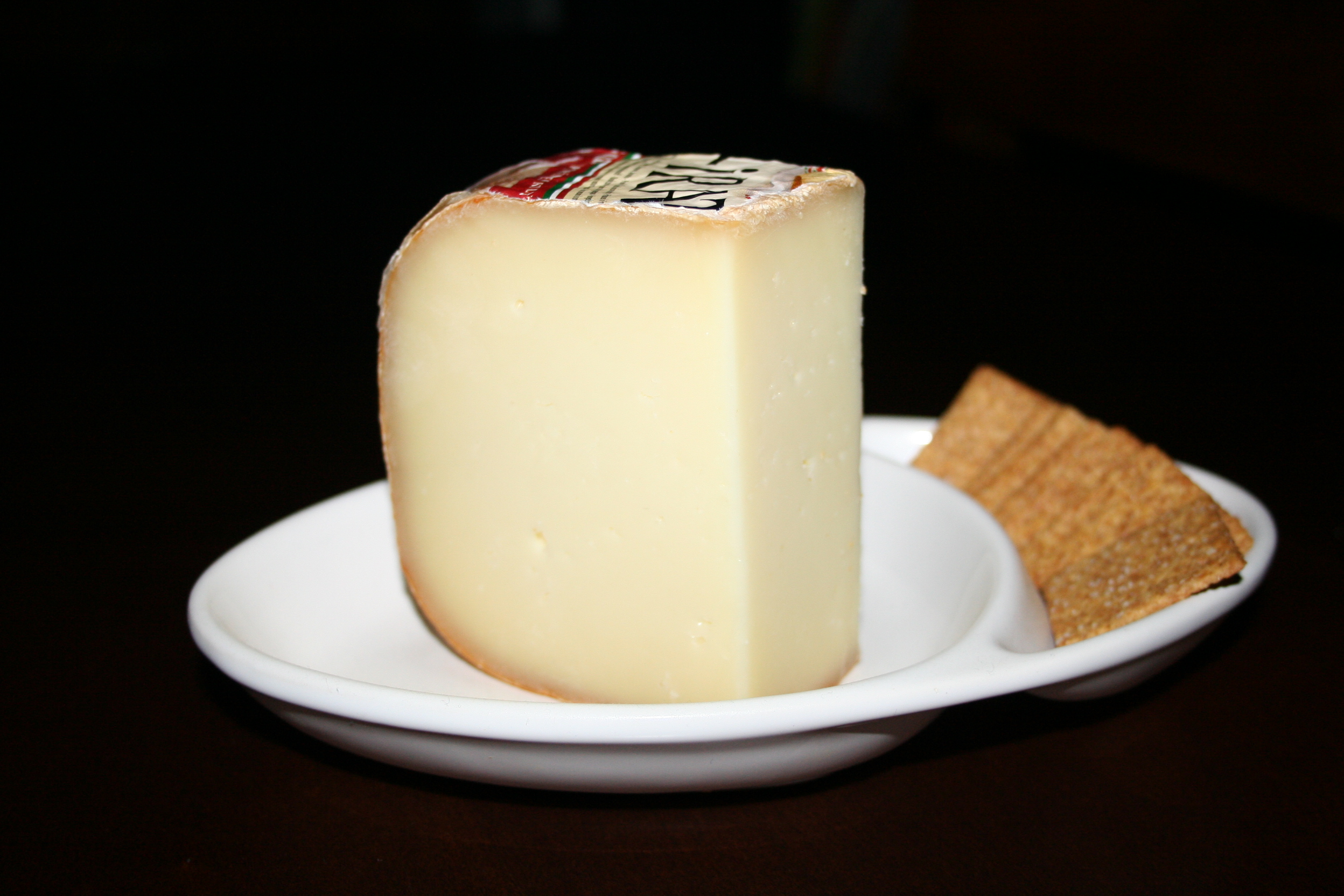
- Country of origin: France
- Region, town: French Basque Country
- Source of milk: Ewe
- Pasteurized: No
- Texture: Medium firm
- Aging time: 80 or 120 days minimum, by weight
- Certification: AOC 1980, PDO
- Named after: Pic du Midi d'Ossau, Irati Forest

Ossau-Iraty (French pronunciation: [ɔso iʁati]) is a Basque cheese made from sheep's milk.

== Origin ==
Ossau-Iraty or Esquirrou is produced in south-western France, in the Northern Basque Country and in Béarn. Its name reflects its geographical location, the Ossau Valley in Béarn and the Irati Forest in the Basque Country.

== AOC status ==
It has been recognized as an appellation d'origine contrôlée (AOC) product since 1980. It is one of three sheep's milk cheeses granted AOC status in France (the others are Roquefort and Brocciu). It is of ancient origin, traditionally made by the shepherds in the region.

== Production ==
Production techniques are very much in the essence of old world methods whereby the sheep still graze mountain pastures. The milk must come from the breeds Basco-Béarnaise, Red-face Manech, or Black-face Manech. This is an uncooked cheese made through pressing. When offered as a farm-produced cheese (known as fromage fermier, fromage de ferme or produit fermier), the AOC regulations stipulate that only raw, unpasteurized milk be used.

Historically, production has been:

- 3,067 tonnes (in 2003)
- 60 producers (in 2003)
- 8 manufacturers: private industries and cooperatives (in 1998)
- 2,045 milk producers (in 1998)

== Description ==
According to the official description, the cheese crust is yellow-orange to gray, and the body color ranges from white to cream depending on how it has been matured. It is smooth, creamy and firm, and may have some small eyes (openings).

== See also ==
- Idiazabal cheese
- List of sheep milk cheeses
