= Pecorino romano =

Hard, salty Italian cheese, often grated

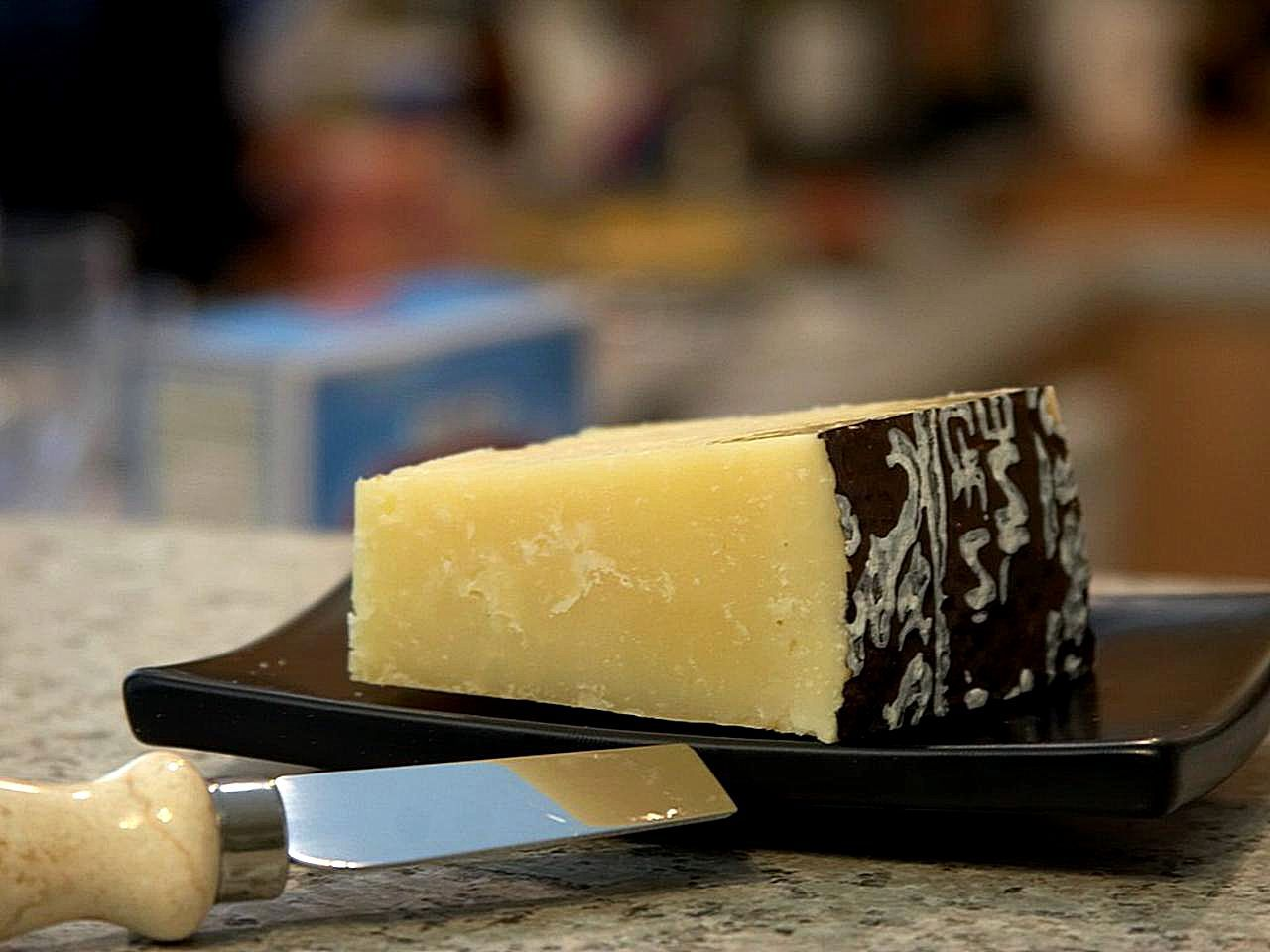
- Country of origin: Italy
- Region: Lazio; Sardinia; Tuscany (province of Grosseto)
- Source of milk: Sheep milk
- Pasteurised: No (pasteurised exports to United States)
- Texture: Hard and very crumbly
- Aging time: 5 months or more
- Certification: PDO: 1996

Pecorino romano (Italian: [pekoˈriːno roˈmaːno]) is a hard, salty Italian cheese made from sheep milk, often used for grating over pasta or other dishes. The name pecorino means 'ovine' or 'of sheep' in Italian; the name of the cheese, although protected, is a description rather than a brand: [formaggio] pecorino romano means 'sheep's [cheese] of Rome'.

Although this variety of cheese originated in Lazio, nearly all of its actual production has moved to the island of Sardinia. The name pecorino romano has a protected designation of origin (PDO) by European Union law, meaning all manufacturing processes must take place within either Sardinia, Lazio or the province of Grosseto.

Pecorino romano was a staple in the diet of the legionaries of ancient Rome. Today, it is still made according to the original recipe and is one of Italy's oldest cheeses. On the first of May (May Day), Roman families traditionally eat pecorino with fresh fava beans during an excursion in the Roman Campagna. It is mostly used in central and southern Italy.

As of 2024, it is the fourth most exported Italian cheese, with 22,000 tons exported overseas annually.

== History ==
What might be considered the earliest form of today's pecorino romano was first created in the countryside around Rome, whose production methods are described in detail by Latin authors such as Marcus Terentius Varro and Pliny the Elder about 2,000 years ago. Its long-term storage capacity led to it being used for feeding Roman legions. A daily ration of about 27 grams (1 Roman ounce) was allotted to the legionaries in addition to bread and farro soup. The cheese revived strength and vigour since it was a high-energy food that was easy to digest.

Pecorino romano was mainly produced in the region surrounding Rome (Lazio) until the end of the 19th century. In 1884, the Roman city council prohibited salting the cheese in the grocers' shops in Rome, but this could not prevent the establishment of salting premises and cheesemaking premises on the outskirts of Rome or elsewhere in the province. Pressure to move production out of Lazio was in fact caused by a great increase in demand for the cheese, which the Lazio flocks could not satisfy. This led several producers to expand their production in Sardinia. Sardinia, which had been experiencing a severe reduction of its forest cover as a direct result of human activity, provided Roman entrepreneurs with a type of soil that was ideal for the promotion of monoculture farming.

Following the 1951 Stresa Convention, which was convened by several European states to address the question of counterfeiting and imitation of traditional food products, and the awarding in 1955 of the first denominazione di origine controllata (DOC) statuses in the dairy sector, pecorino cheese production was formally protected in Sardinia, Lazio, and Grosseto.

In 1979, the Consortium for the Protection of Pecorino Romano Cheese was established with headquarters in Macomer, a comune with several established cheese factories. In 1981 the Consortium was tasked by the Ministry of Agriculture to supervise the production and trade of pecorino romano, and in 2002 to protect its PDO status.

== Production ==
Pecorino romano is a hard, cooked cheese produced exclusively from sheep milk. The milk is coagulated using rennet at a temperature between 38–40 °C (100–104 °F). Once the curd has hardened, it is broken into smaller curds the size of a grain of rice and cooked at a temperature no higher than 48 °C (118 °F). Pecorino romano must be made with rennet from sheep raised in the same production area, and is consequently not suitable for vegetarians.

The wheels are cylindrical with flat faces, with a height of 25–40 cm and a diameter of 25–35 cm, and weigh 20–35 kg (44–77 lb). They have a thin ivory-coloured rind which is sometimes covered with substances for food protection. They are stamped with the logo of geographical distinction and an indication of the province of origin.

40% of produced pecorino romano is consumed domestically. More than half of international exports are destined for the United States.

== See also ==
- List of Italian cheeses
- List of Italian DOP cheeses – food with protected designation of origin status
- List of sheep milk cheeses
- List of ancient dishes
- Pecorino – hard Italian sheep's milk cheese
