= Saloio =

Portuguese cheese brand

- Traded as: Food company
- Headquarters: Portugal
- Products: Cheese; Requeijão
- Website: www.queijosaloio.pt

Saloio is a brand of Portuguese cheese manufactured in the region of Ponte do Rol, 50 km (31 mi) north of Lisbon. It is made from sheep's milk with no salt. It is a firm cheese usually served in small cylinders that are 5 cm wide and 6 cm high.

Another meaning of saloio is of a non-urban person, i.e., a person living outside a large city in the countryside. Originally it was a term applied to someone who lives in the rural areas surrounding Lisbon, the capital of Portugal.
