= Mihaliç peyniri =

Aged sheep's milk cheese from Turkey

- Country of origin: Turkey
- Source of milk: sheep
- Texture: hard
- Fat content: 45%

Mihaliç peyniri is an aged sheep's milk cheese from Turkey.

Similar to kefalotyri or beyaz peynir, Mihaliç peyniri is stored in brine. The curds are placed in hot water and stirred, then left in the water to harden and acquire a firm, slightly elastic texture and finally are salted and dried.

It is made in various sizes and shapes, usually balls or slices, and can be used as a substitute for Parmigiano Reggiano. It is often used in salads and baked dishes.
