= Pag cheese =

Sheep milk cheese from the Croatian island Pag

Paški sir
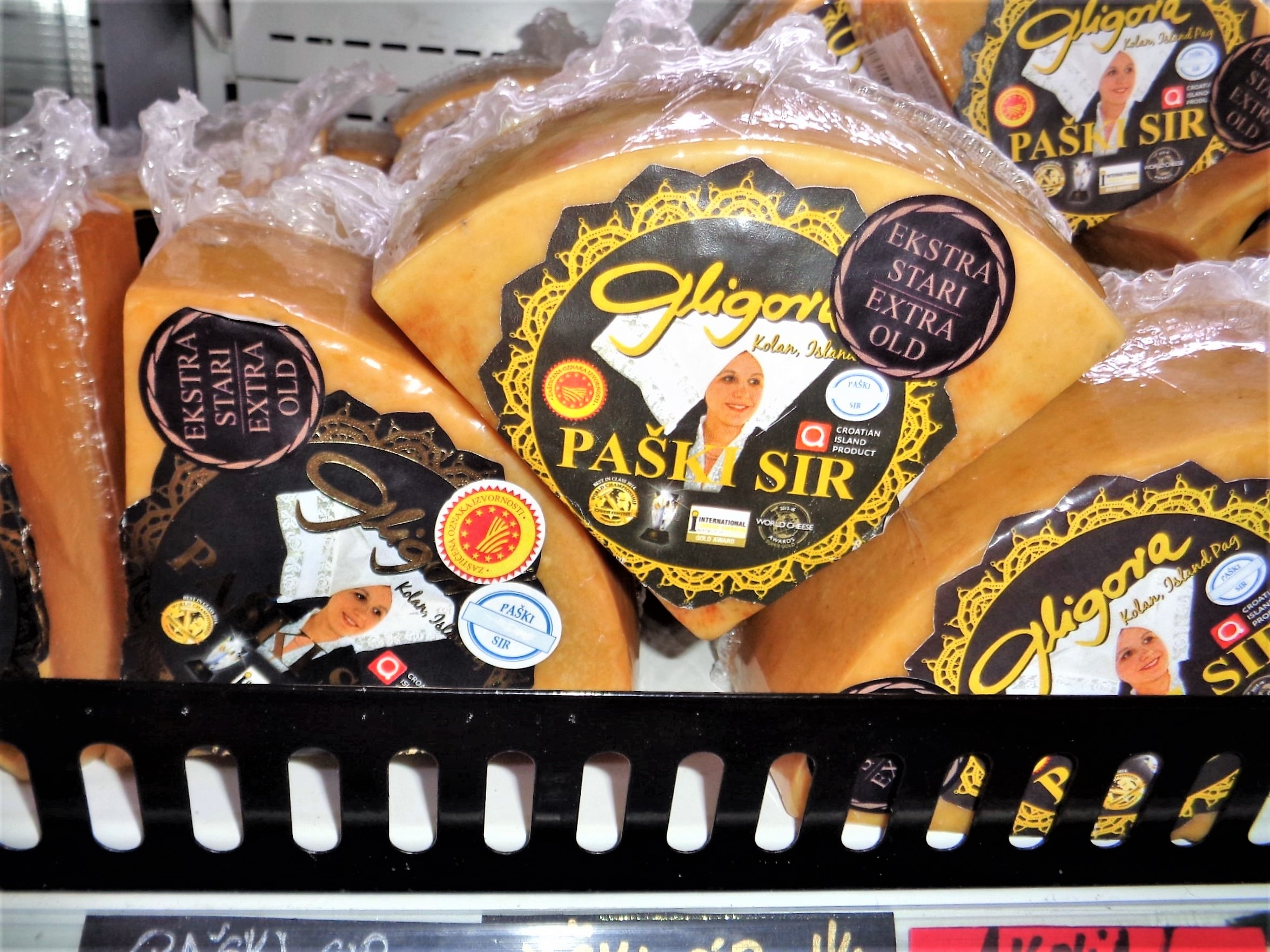
- Country of origin: Croatia
- Region: Northern Dalmatia
- Town: Pag (island)
- Source of milk: Sheep
- Pasteurized: Frequently
- Texture: Hard
- Aging time: 2–18 months
- Certification: Paški Sir PDO
- Named after: Pag

Pag cheese or Pag Island cheese (Croatian: Paški sir, [pâːʃkiː sîr]) is a Croatian variety of hard, distinctively flavored sheep milk cheese originating from the Adriatic island of Pag.

== History ==
Until early in the 20th century, the inhabitants of Pag had their own dry stone huts in which they milked the sheep and made Pag cheese. The majority of the pastures are located on the hilly parts of the island. Historically, there was no private ownership of the pastures and the sheep freely grazed on all of the land.

Over time, the pastures became privately owned, so the shepherds moved back into towns, and their huts became pasture homes. As shepherds commuted to and from pastures, the women assumed the role of cheese makers. Besides being food for the locals, Pag cheese was also traded in markets across Croatia.

== Production process ==
Island Pag has a long tradition of cheese making and agriculture.

Because of the Pag Bora, a strong, cool, dry wind, a dry salt dust is scattered all over the island, letting only resilient and aromatic plant species to survive.

Sheep on Pag feed off of these plants, which influences the taste of their milk, used to produce Pag cheese.

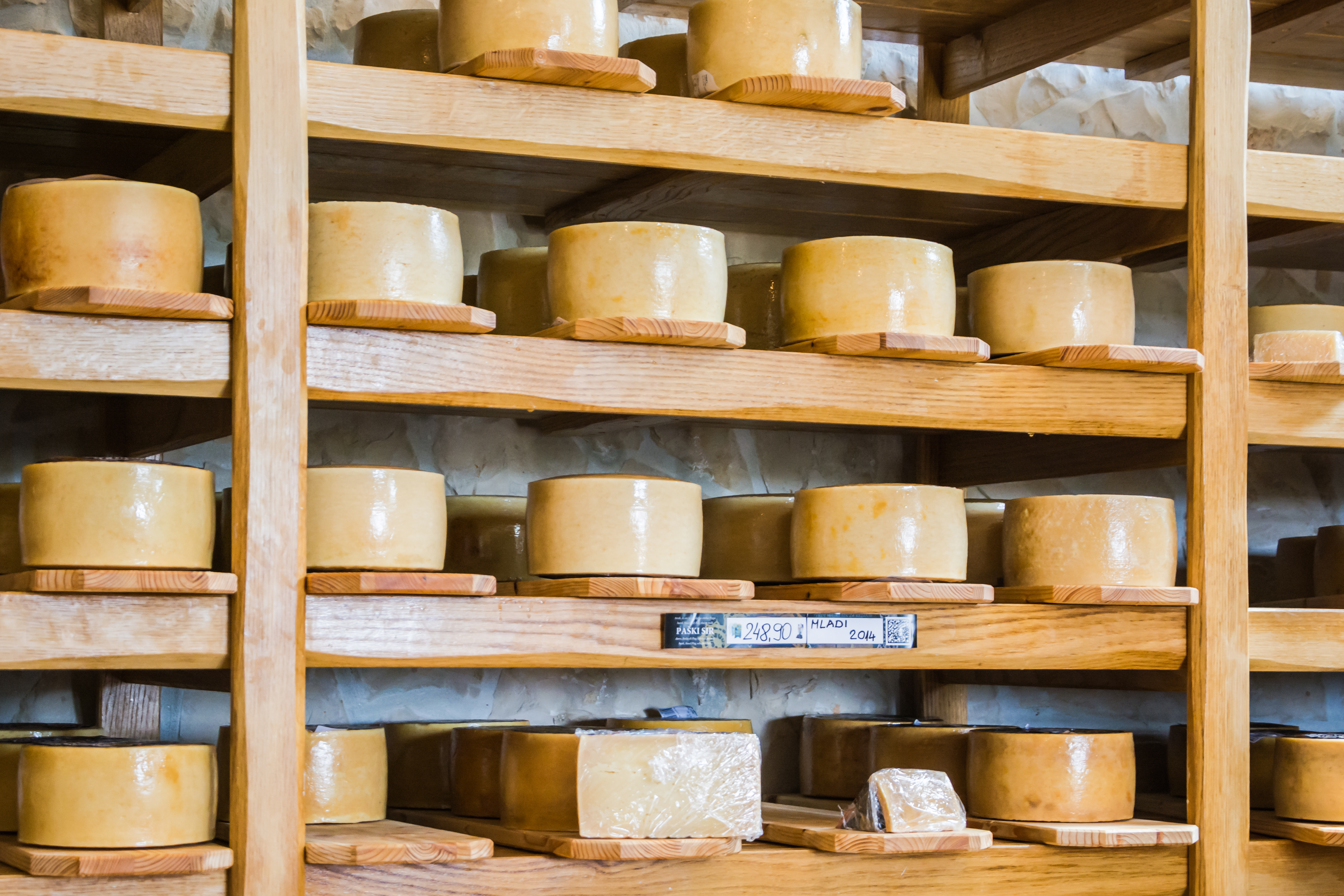
Pag cheese

Pag cheese is aged five to eighteen months, depending on the desired end product. Cheeses that have been aged over 10 years can also be found. The aging process and flavor is affected by seasonal changes in temperature and humidity. Younger cheeses tend to be creamy, with a fresher aroma and a yellow color. Older cheeses are darker, harder, with a grainy texture, and a more mature flavor.

== Certification ==
The main producers of Pag cheese came together to form an association with the aim of obtaining Protected Designation of Origin for Pag cheese. The European Commission has granted the designation on 25 November 2019. PDO imposes conditions on production techniques, as well as a particular origin of base products which are meant to ensure that Pag cheese remains a product of Pag.

== Awards ==
In 2017, Paška sirana won a gold award for Sheep Milk Specialty Cheese at the Global Cheese Awards, and Sirana MiH won a gold medal for its Paški sir at Croatian Cheese Days.

In 2018, Sirana Gligora’s Paški sir won the Super Gold Award at the World Cheese Awards in 2018.

In 2022, at the World Cheese Awards, Sirana Gligora’s žigljen won Super Gold, Paški sir won Gold, Žigljen extra old and Paški extra old won Silver, and Dimljeni čili (Smoked chili) won Bronze.

== See also ==
- Croatian cuisine
