= Casar de Cáceres =

Casar de Cáceres, Spain
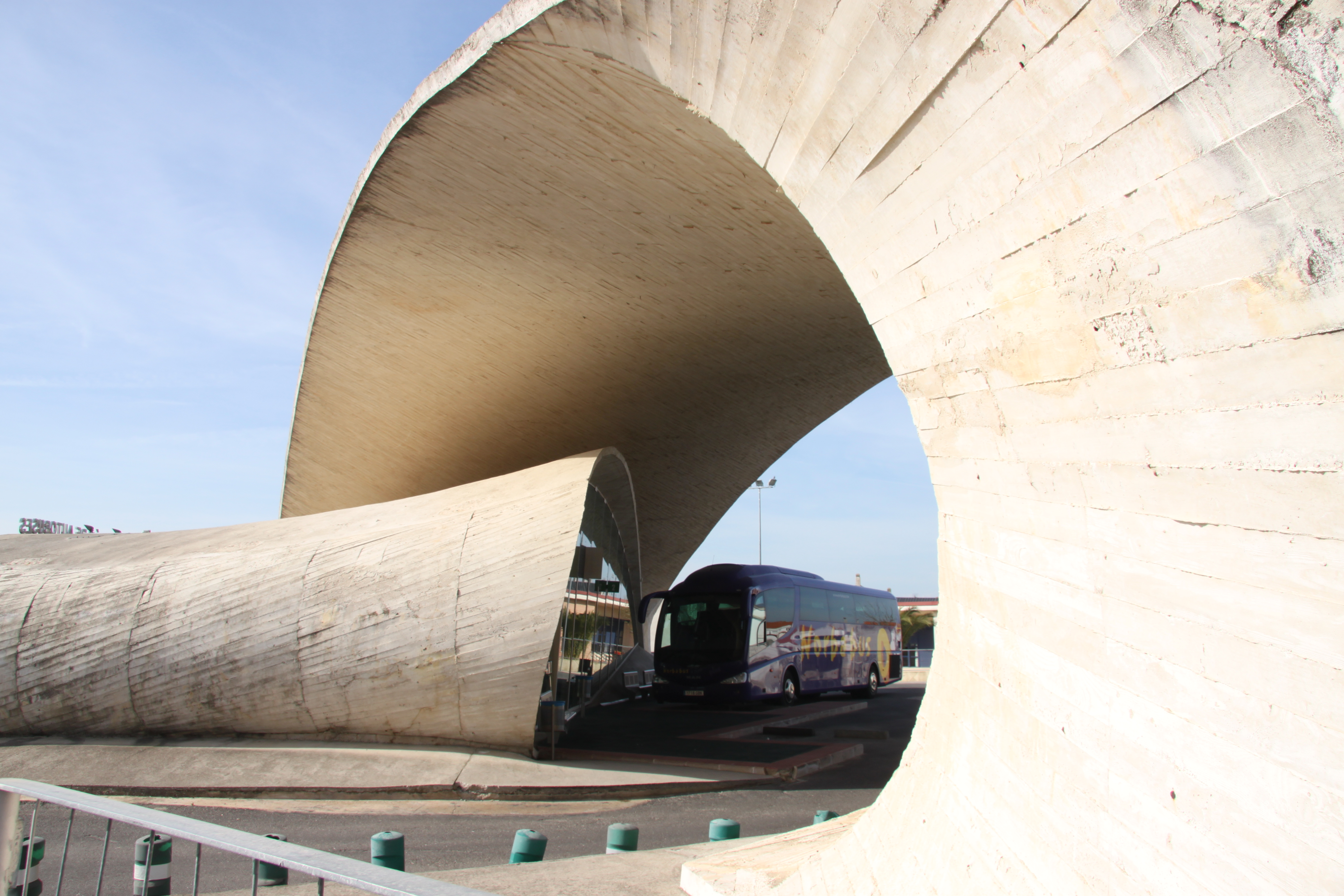

- Flag Coat of arms
- Interactive map of Casar de Cáceres, Spain
- Coordinates: 39°33′N 6°25′W
- Country: Spain
- Autonomous community: Extremadura
- Province: Cáceres
- Municipality: Casar de Cáceres

Area
  - Total: 130 km^{2} (50 sq mi)
- Elevation: 365 m (1,198 ft)

Population (2025-01-01)
  - Total: 4,511
  - Density: 35/km^{2} (90/sq mi)
- Time zone: UTC+1 (CET)
  - Summer (DST): UTC+2 (CEST)

Casar de Cáceres is a town and municipality in the province of Cáceres, in the autonomous community of Extremadura. With 4532 inhabitants in 2017, it is the second most populous municipality in the Tajo-Salor Mancomunidad. In the municipality there are two population centers: Casar de Cáceres and La Perala. The capital of the municipality is located about 10 kilometers from the capital of Caceres, in the middle of Vía de la Plata.

During the Ancien Régime, the municipality belonged to the comunidad de villa y tierra of Cáceres. and until the first half of the 19th century it was considered as a hamlet of the village of Cáceres.

== History ==
Although the precise origin of the town is unknown, archaeologists have found a Bronze Age fort, a pre-Roman funeral stele and anthropomorphic tombs, among other remains, suggesting inhabitants since ancient times. During Roman times, the town lay along the Vía de la Plata.

In 1291, Sancho IV of Castile granted the town the privilege to cultivate the land; the ratification of Carlos IV has been preserved in the municipal archive. El Casar belonged to the Land of Cáceres.

At the fall of the Ancién Regime the town was constituted as a constitutional municipality in the region of Extremadura, being integrated since 1834 in the Judicial District of Cáceres.

== See also ==
- List of municipalities in Cáceres
