= Manchego =

Firm sheep milk cheese from Spain

Manchego Queso manchego (Spanish)
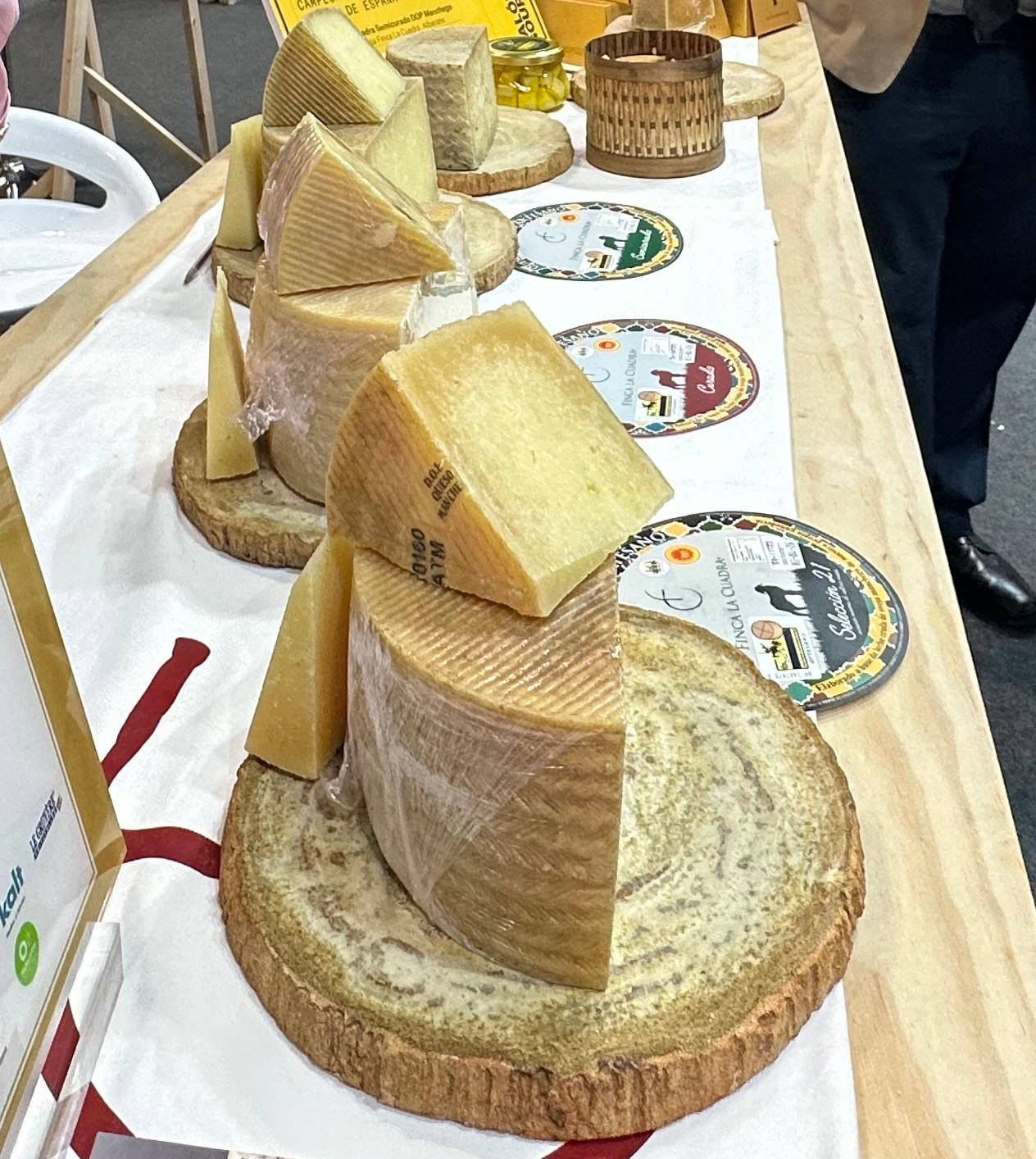
- Country of origin: Spain
- Region: La Mancha
- Source of milk: Ewes
- Texture: Firm and compact
- Fat content: 6.5% min
- Protein content: 4.5% min
- Dimensions: max height 12 cm (4.7 in) max diameter 22 cm (8.7 in)
- Weight: min 0.4 kg (0.88 lb), max 4.0 kg (8.8 lb)
- Aging time: min 30 days, max 2 years
- Certification: PDO
- Named after: La Mancha

Manchego (Spanish: queso manchego, pronounced [ˈkeso manˈtʃeɣo]) is a cheese made in the La Mancha region of Spain from the milk of sheep of the Manchega breed. It is aged between 60 days and 2 years.

Manchego has a firm and compact consistency and a buttery texture, often containing small, unevenly distributed air pockets. The colour of the cheese varies from white to ivory-yellow, and the inedible rind from yellow to brownish-beige. The cheese has a distinctive flavour, well developed but not too strong, creamy with a slight piquancy, and leaves an aftertaste that is characteristic of sheep's milk.

The designation queso manchego is protected under Spain's denominación de origen regulatory classification system, and the cheese has been granted Protected Designation of Origin (PDO) status by the European Union.

== PDO requirements ==
A queso manchego must satisfy these requirements:

- It must be produced within designated parts of the provinces of Albacete, Ciudad Real, Cuenca, and Toledo, all in the La Mancha region.
- It can be made only with the whole milk of sheep of the Manchega breed raised on registered farms within that area.
- It must be aged for a minimum of 60 days (30 days for cheeses weighing up to 1.5 kg or 3.3 lb) and a maximum of two years.
- It must be produced by pressing in a cylindrical mould that has a maximum height of 12 cm (4.7 in) and a maximum diameter of 22 cm (8.7 in).

Manchego cheese can be made from pasteurised or raw milk; if the latter, it may be labelled artesano (artisan). The only permitted additives are natural rennet or another approved coagulating enzyme and salt.

== Manufacture and labelling ==
The moulds in which the cheese is pressed are barrel-shaped. Traditionally, manchego cheese was made by pressing the curd in plaited esparto grass baskets, which left a distinctive zig-zag pattern (known as pleita) on the rind. Today, the same effect is achieved by the mould, the inside of which has a design in relief that imparts to the finished cheese an embossed pattern similar to that of woven esparto grass. The top and bottom surfaces of the cheese are impressed with a design of a head of wheat.

During the maturation process, manchego cheese develops a natural rind. The regulations permit this to be washed, coated in paraffin, dipped in olive oil, or treated with certain approved transparent substances, but require that it must not be removed if the cheese is to be marketed as PDO.

Cheeses that meet the PDO requirements carry a casein tab that is applied when the cheese is in the mould and bear a distinctive label that is issued by the Manchego Cheese Denomination of Origin Regulating Council; this carries the legend queso manchego, a serial number, and artwork depicting Don Quixote de La Mancha.

A cheese that is similar to manchego and made in the same region, but from a blend of cows’, goats’, and ewes’ milk, is sold as queso ibérico, or ibérico cheese.

Almost 60% of Spanish cheese with Denomination of Origin is Manchego, which makes it the main reference of Spanish cheese. As most of its production is exported, it is one of the most important ambassadors of Spain’s national gastronomy. La Mancha exported 5.9 million kg of this cheese in 2017, according to the Foundation for Manchego Cheese (Fundación C.R.D.O Queso Manchego).

== Varieties ==
Queso manchego has a variety of different flavours depending on its age:

- Fresco: fresh cheese is aged for 2 weeks. It has a rich but mild flavour, not a true queso manchego due to its lack of ageing. Produced in small quantities, it is rarely found outside Spain.
- Semicurado: semifirm, semicured cheese aged for 3 weeks to 3–4 months, somewhat milder than curado.
- Curado: semifirm cured cheese aged for 3–6 months with a caramel and nutty flavour.
- Viejo: aged for 1–2 years, firm with a sharper flavour the longer it is aged; it has a rich, deep pepperiness to it. It grates well, but can also be eaten on its own or on tapas.

== Americas ==
=== North America ===
In Mexico and Spanish-speaking areas of the United States, manchego or queso tipo manchego (manchego-type cheese) is the name given to an industrialized cow's milk cheese similar in taste to Monterey Jack. It melts well and is used as both a table cheese and for cooking. Apart from the name, this cheese has nothing in common with the Spanish variety.

=== Central America ===
In Costa Rica, three companies (Dos Pinos, Los Alpes, and Monteverde) produce a manchego-type cheese (queso tipo manchego), which can come with a drawing of Don Quijote on the labels. One company also makes a manchego-type cheese with basil added. These Costa Rican cheeses can come dipped in paraffin wax, and some have the pleita pattern pressed on the side.

== See also ==
- List of cheeses
