= Sheep milk =

Dairy product

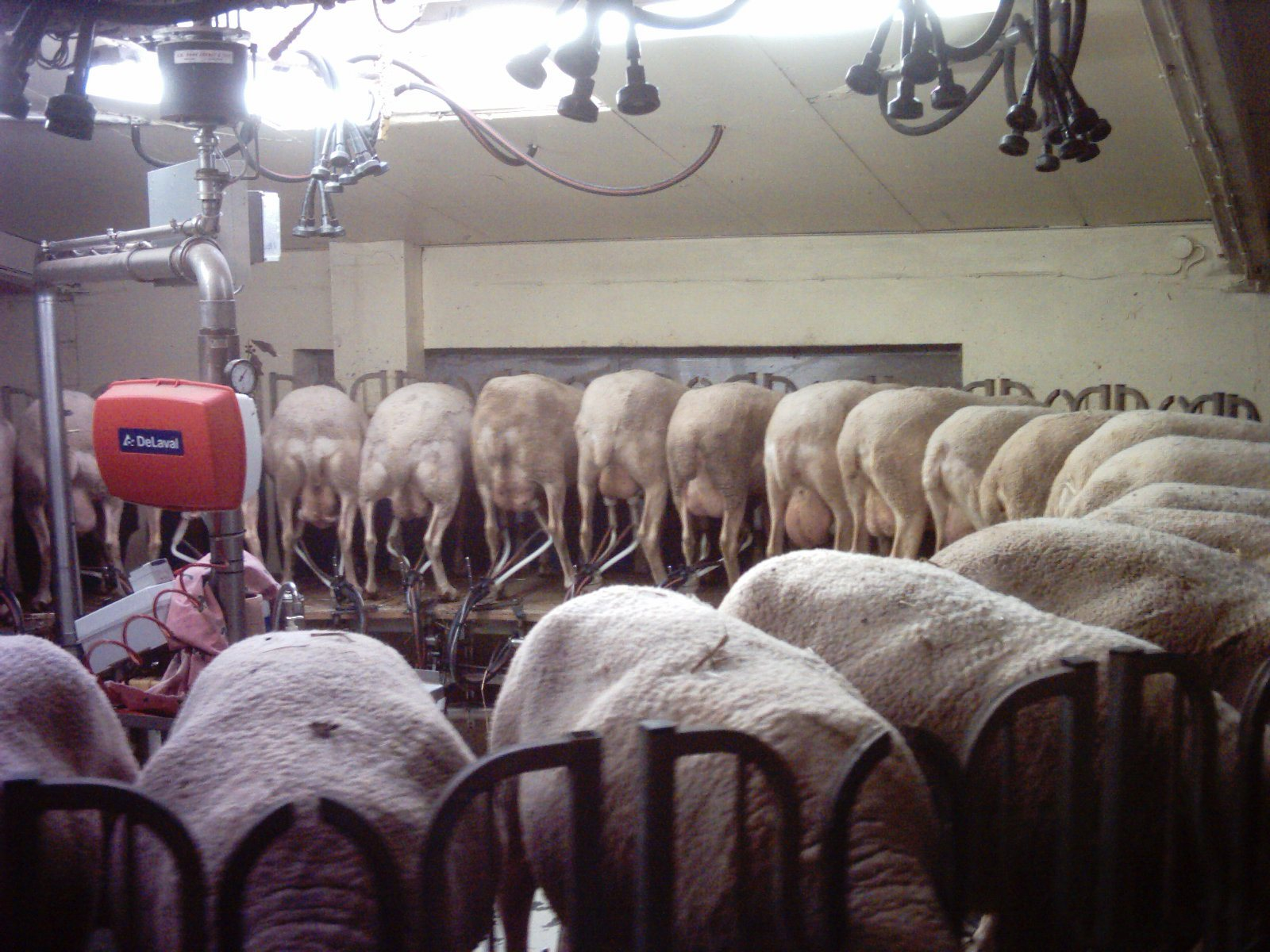
Lacaune dairy sheep in rotary parlour, Aveyron, France

Sheep milk is the milk of domestic sheep. It is commonly used to make cultured dairy products, such as cheese. Some of the most popular sheep cheeses include feta (Greece), pecorino romano (Italy), Roquefort (France) and Manchego (Spain).

== Sheep breeds ==
Specialized dairy breeds of sheep yield more milk than other breeds. Common dairy breeds include:

- East Friesian (Germany)
- Sarda (Italy)
- Lacaune (France)
- British Milk Sheep (UK)
- Chios (Greece)
- Awassi (Syria)
- Assaf (Israel)
- Zwartbles (Friesland, Netherlands)

In the U.S., the most common dairy breeds are the East Friesian and the Lacaune. Meat or wool breeds do not produce as much milk as dairy breeds, but may produce enough for small amounts of cheese and other products.

== Milk production period ==
Sheep milk has the third highest CO2 emissions intensity of any agricultural commodity.

Female sheep (ewes) do not produce milk constantly. Instead, they produce milk during the 80–100 days after lambing. Sheep naturally breed in the fall, which means that a majority of lambs are born in the winter or early spring. Milk production decreases and eventually stops when lambs are weaned or the days are shorter. Milk cannot be produced year-round. Through the use of controlled internal drug release (CIDR), ewes can be bred out of season. CIDR drugs contain progesterone, which is slowly released into the bloodstream, bringing the animal into estrus. In this way, ewes can be bred at different times throughout the year, providing farms with a year-round supply of milk.

Meat and wool breeds of sheep lactate for 90–150 days, while dairy breeds can lactate for 120–240 days. Dairy sheep can produce higher yields of milk per ewe per year. Dairy sheep can produce 400–1,100 lb (180–500 kg) of milk per year while other sheep produce 100–200 lb (45–91 kg) of milk per year. Crossbred ewes produce 300–650 lb (140–290 kg) of milk per year.

== Products made from sheep's milk ==
Sheep milk cheeses include the Kashkaval of Turkey, Roquefort of France, Manchego of Spain; Serra da Estrela from Portugal; pecorino Romano (the Italian word for sheep is pecora) and pecorino Sardo of Italy; Pag cheese of Croatia; Ġbejna of Malta; and Gomolya of Hungary; and Bryndza (Slovenská bryndza from Slovakia, brânza de burduf from Romania and Bryndza Podhalańska from Poland).

A byproduct of making bryndza is the drink Žinčica which is drunk in Poland and Slovakia.

Whey cheeses are also made from sheep's milk: various ricottas of Italy (but the best-known are made from buffalo milk); anthotyros, mizithra, manouri, and xynomizithra of Greece (often with goat milk mixed in); various requeijão in Portugal.

In Greece, yogurt is often made from sheep's milk.

== Nutrition by comparison ==
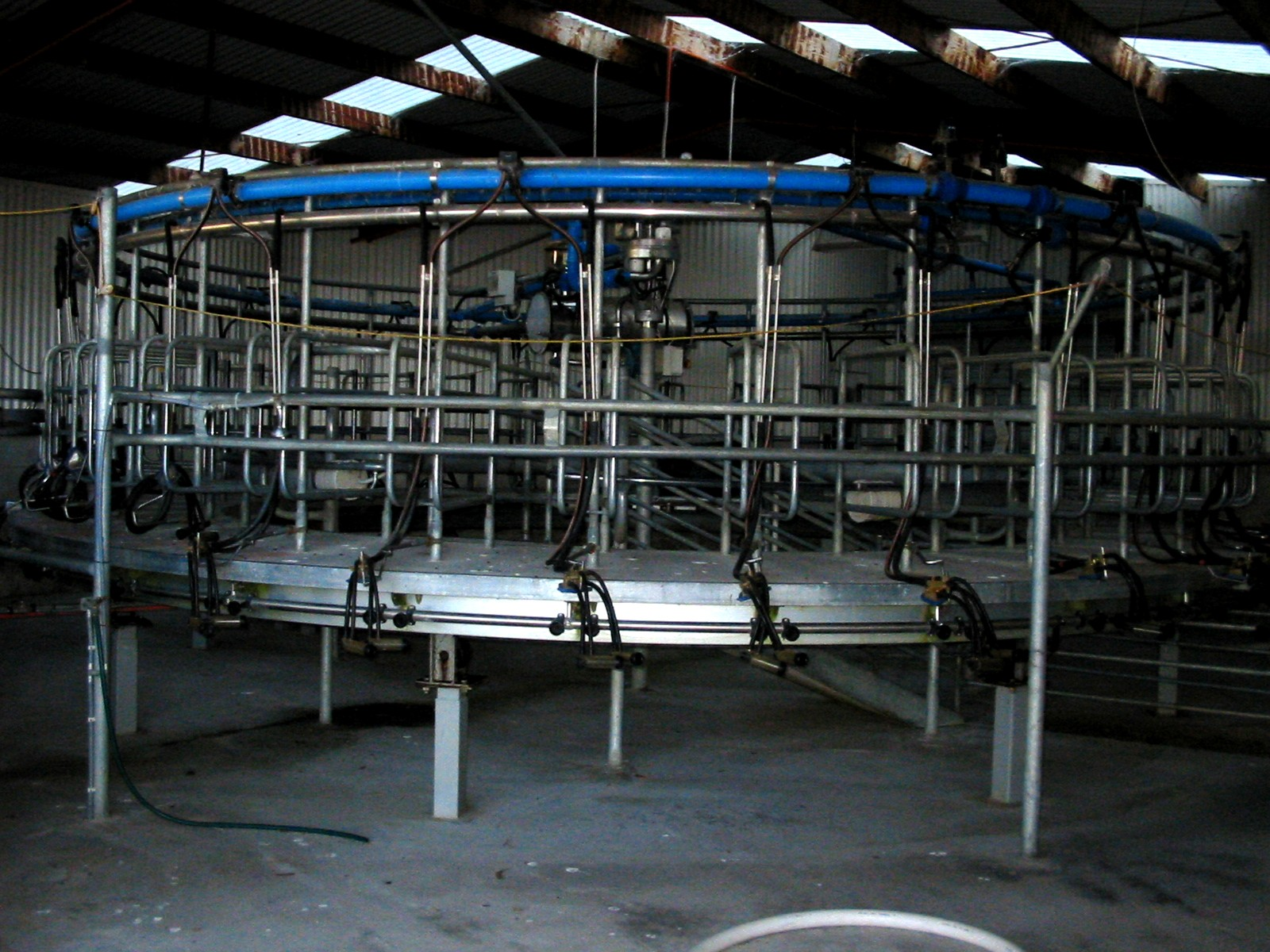
Mechanical sheep's milker, South Island, New Zealand

Milk composition analysis, per 100 grams
Constituents	Unit	Cow	Goat	Water buffalo	Sheep
Water	g	87.8	88.9	81.1	83.0
Protein	g	3.2	3.1	4.5	5.4
Fat	g	3.9	3.5	8.0	7.0
—Saturated	g	2.4	2.3	4.2	3.8
—Mono-unsaturated	g	1.1	0.8	1.7	1.5
—Polyunsaturated	g	0.1	0.1	0.2	0.3
Carbohydrate (lactose)	g	4.8	4.4	4.9	5.1
Energy	kcal	66	60	110	95
Energy	kJ	275	253	463	396
Cholesterol	mg	14	10	8	11
Calcium	IU	120	100	195	170

Sheep's milk is exceptionally high in fat and conjugated linoleic acid (CLA) and has a high level of solids, as compared to other kinds of milk, making it very suitable for cheese-making. In particular, sheep's milk produces much more cheese than the same amount of cow's milk.

== See also ==
- Donkey milk
- Goat milk
- Mare milk
- Moose milk
- List of dairy products
- List of sheep milk cheeses
- Sheep farming
