= List of cheeses =

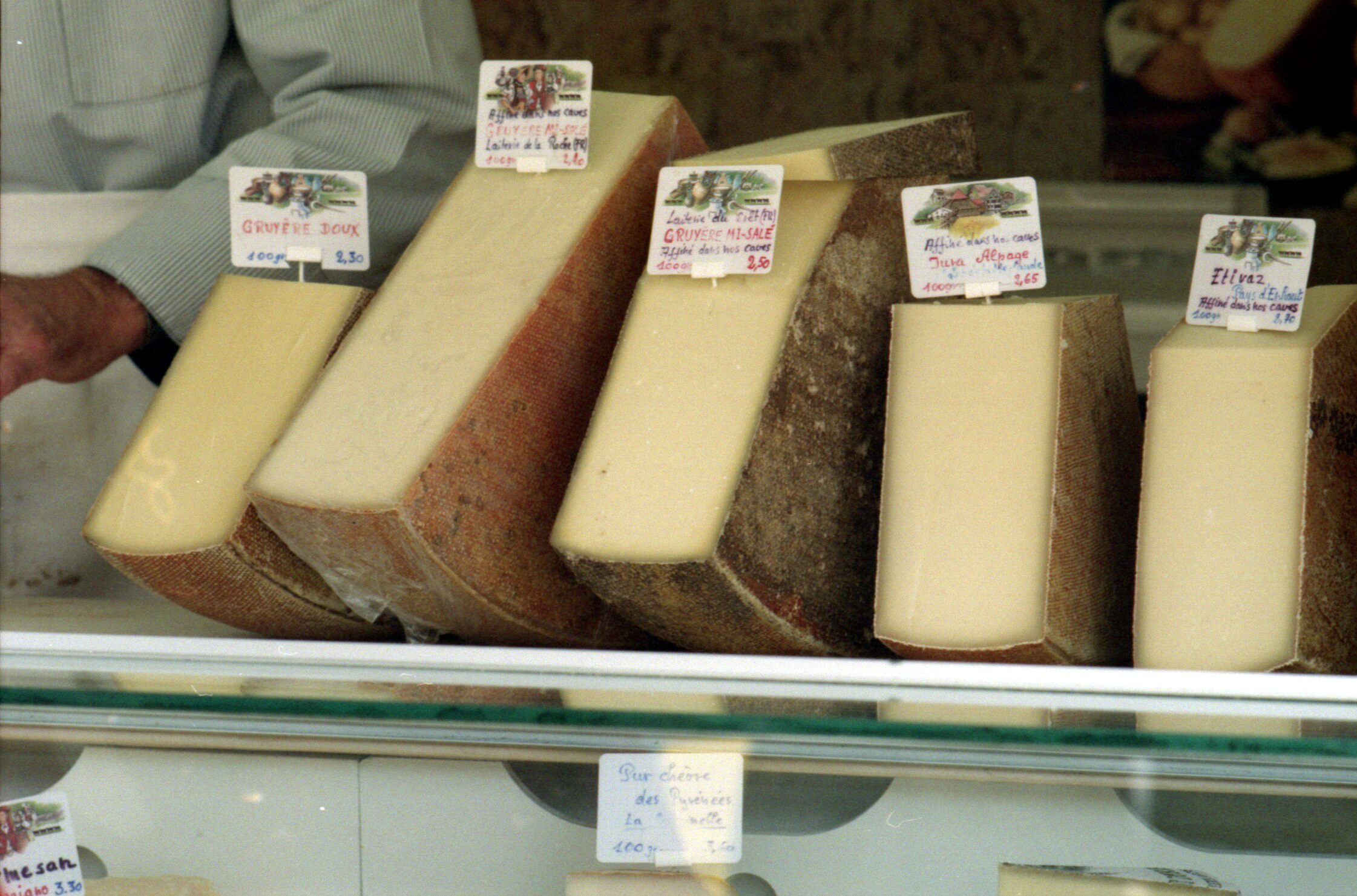
Different types of Gruyère, Jura Alpage and Etivaz cheeses at a food market in Lausanne, Switzerland.

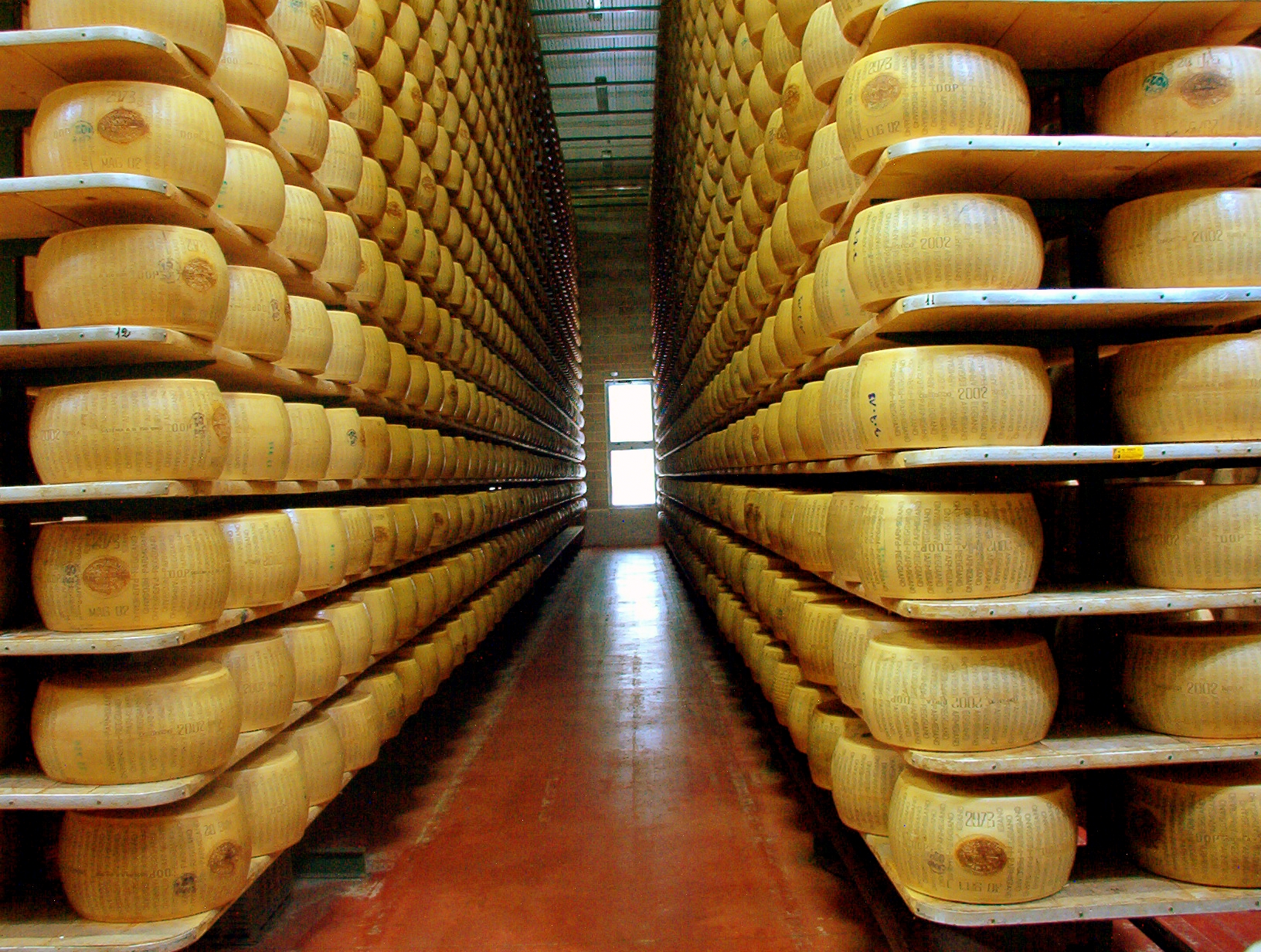
Parmigiano-Reggiano ripening in a modern factory

This is a list of cheeses by place of origin. Cheese is a milk-based food that is produced in wide-ranging flavors, textures, and forms. Hundreds of types of cheese from various countries are produced. Their styles, textures and flavors depend on the origin of the milk (including the animal's diet), whether they have been pasteurized, the butterfat content, the bacteria and mold, the processing, and aging.

Herbs, spices, or wood smoke may be used as flavoring agents. The yellow to red color of many cheeses, such as Red Leicester, is normally formed from adding annatto. While most current varieties of cheese may be traced to a particular locale, or culture, within a single country, some have a more diffuse origin, and cannot be considered to have originated in a particular place, but are associated with a whole region, such as queso blanco in Latin America.

Cheese is an ancient food whose origins predate recorded history. There is no conclusive evidence indicating where cheesemaking originated, either in Europe, Central Asia or the Middle East, but the practice had spread within Europe prior to Roman times and, according to Pliny the Elder, had become a sophisticated enterprise by the time the Roman Empire came into existence.

In this list, types of cheeses are included; brand names are only included if they apply to a distinct variety of cheese.

Cheese production involves several steps, including curdling, coagulation, separation, shaping, and aging. The type of milk used, as well as factors like temperature, humidity, and bacterial cultures, can greatly impact the final product's flavor, texture, and appearance. Artisanal cheesemakers often employ traditional techniques and recipes passed down through generations, while larger commercial operations may utilize more modern and mechanized processes to produce cheese on a larger scale.

== Africa ==
=== Algeria ===
Name	Image	Region	Description
Bouhezza		Aurès Mountains	Bouhezza is a ripened cheese that has traditionally been prepared by the Chaouia community between March and June. It has historically been made from raw goat or sheep milk (and is also now made with cow's milk) with the addition of leben (fermented milk), salt, and additional raw milk. It has a soft, smooth, and spreadable texture and is slightly salty, spicy, and acidic, with an intense acidic lactic odor and aroma.
Kemariya		Ghardaia and Naâma	Produced by local women from the indigenous Wilaya community in southern Algeria, kemariya is a variety of smooth white cheese that is traditionally made with goat milk and can alternatively be made with cow’s milk or camel’s milk. It is also referred to as takkmerit by local Berbers.

=== Benin ===
Name	Image	Region	Description
Wagasi		Northern Benin	A soft cow's milk cheese commonly made by the Fulani people that is sold in many units in Parakou, a city in Central Benin.

=== Egypt ===
Name	Image	Region	Description
Areesh			A type of white, soft, lactic, crumbly cheese made from laban rayeb.
Domiati			A soft white cheese usually made from cow or buffalo milk. It is salted, heated, coagulated using rennet and then ladled into wooden molds where the whey is drained away for three days. The cheese may be eaten fresh, or stored in salted whey for up to eight months, then matured in brine. Domiati cheese accounts for about three-quarters of the cheese made and consumed in Egypt. The cheese takes its name from the city of Damietta and is thought to have been made as early as 332 BC.
Halumi			Similar to Cypriot halloumi, yet a different cheese. It may be eaten fresh or brined and spiced. The name comes from the Coptic word for cheese, "halum".
Istanbolly			A type of white cheese made from cow or buffalo milk, similar to feta cheese.
Mish			A sharp and salty product made by fermenting cheese for several months in salted whey. It is an important part of the diet of farmers. Mish is often made at home from areesh cheese. Products similar to mish are made commercially from different types of Egyptian cheese such as domiati or rumi, with different ages.
Rumi			A hard, bacterially ripened variety of cheese. It belongs to the same family as Pecorino Romano and Manchego. It is salty, with a crumbly texture, and is sold at different stages of aging. Although the texture and taste of Rumi cheese differ according to the aging period, it is usually sharp, strong, and pungent.

=== Ethiopia ===
Name	Image	Region	Description
Ayibe			A local cheese that is mild and crumbly. It has little flavor on its own, and is often served as a side dish to soften the effect of very spicy food.

=== Mauritania ===
Name	Image	Region	Description
Caravane cheese			The brand name of a camel milk cheese produced in Mauritania by Tiviski, a company founded by Nancy Abeiderrhamane in 1987. The milk used to make the cheese is collected from the local animals of a thousand nomadic herdsmen, and is very difficult to produce, but yields a product that is low in lactose. It is also available and consumed in Senegal.

=== Nigeria ===
Name	Image	Region	Description
Warankasi			A Yoruba cheese made from cow's milk.

=== South Africa ===
Name	Image	Region	Description
Kwaito			Kwaito is a South African gouda-style cheese made from cow's milk. It has a creamy texture and mild flavor. Apart from plain and smoked varieties, it may be flavored with peppercorns or other peppers.

== Asia ==
=== Armenia ===
Name	Image	Region	Description
Aragatsyan panir		Aragatsotn	A semi-hard cheese made from high-quality sheep's milk or its mixture with cow's or goat's milk. It has a mild nutty flavor, soft texture, and a natural rind. Less salty than brined cheeses, with a fat content of 50% or higher.
Chanakh		Armenian Highlands	A traditional brined cheese with a sharp, salty flavor and firm, slightly brittle texture, aged in brine and shaped into blocks or truncated cones.
Chechil		Armenian Highlands	A brined string cheese that originated either in Armenia or in Georgia, it has a consistency approximating that of suluguni or mozzarella and is produced in the form of dense strings, rolled up in a figure eight of thick braid-shaped ropes.
Kanach panir		Shirak	A mold-ripened cheese known for its greenish appearance and crumbly texture. It is aged in clay pots or leather bags, where natural or introduced mold develops, giving the cheese a sharp flavor and soft texture. Commonly consumed in the Shirak Province, it is typically served fresh and not used in cooked dishes.
Lori		Lori	A semi-soft Armenian cheese made from pasteurized cow's milk. Similar to halloumi, its curds are boiled during production and the cheese is preserved in brine.
Motal		Syunik and Artsakh	A traditional Armenian brined cheese made primarily from sheep's milk or a mixture of sheep's and goat's milk. It is aged for several months in tki, leather containers made from animal hides, and may include herbs such as wild thyme. The cheese has a crumbly texture and a strong, distinctive flavor.
Tel panir		Armenian Highlands	Tel panir is a traditional Armenian string cheese made from strained, fermented milk. A type of chechil cheese, it’s known for its distinctive braided or threaded form.
Yeghegnadzor		Vayots Dzor	A semi-soft, aromatic cheese traditionally aged in clay vessels buried underground. Made from cow's or goat's milk with local herbs and seeds, it develops a sharp, salty flavor and creamy, slightly crumbly texture after at least six months of underground maturation. Also known as horats panir.

=== China ===
The dominant Han Chinese culture is not dairy-centric, in part due to low rates of lactase persistence. However, some indigenous sociolinguistic groups in regions of the country, such as Inner Mongolia, Tibet and Yunnan, have strong cheese traditions.

Name	Image	Region	Description
Byaslag			Mild, unripened Mongolian cheese made from yak or cow milk.
Chura kampo			(Tibetan dried cheese) is a Tibetan cheese and important within the cuisine of Tibet. Chura kampo is made from the curds that are left over from boiling buttermilk.
Chura loenpa			A Tibetan cheese that is significant within the cuisine of Tibet. It is a soft cheese, similar to cottage cheese, made from the curds that are left over from boiling buttermilk.
Kurut			A Central Asian cheese made from the solids of naturally soured milk which are then rolled into balls and allowed to air-dry. It is used in Uyghur cuisine, among others, and was also found as a grave good for some of the Tarim mummies.
Nguri			A buffalo's milk cheese of Fujian province, China. It is in a ball-shape approximately the size of a table tennis ball and has a soft, leathery texture.
Rubing			A firm, fresh goat milk cheese made in the Yunnan Province of China by people of the Bai and Sani (recognized as a branch of the Yi in China) minorities. Pictured is fried rubing cheese.
Rushan	Rushan		The name means "milk fan" as it is said to resemble a folding fan. It is traditionally made by the Bai people.

=== Georgia ===
Name	Image	Region	Description
Imeruli		Imereti	A "quick cheese" made from cow's milk. It has a soft "springy" texture and a salty, slightly sour flavour.
Sulguni		Samegrelo	A pickled Georgian cheese from the Samegrelo region. It has a sour, moderately salty flavor, a dimpled texture, and an elastic consistency; these attributes are the result of the process used, as is the source of its moniker "pickle cheese". Its color ranges from white to pale yellow. Sulguni is often deep-fried, which masks its odor. It is often served in wedges.
Tenili		Meskheti	A string cheese made from either ewe's or cow's milk. It has been included in the Intangible cultural heritage of Georgia since 2013.

=== India ===
Name	Image	Region	Description
Bandel		An Asian cheese that originated in a Portuguese colony Bandel located in eastern India. Today, production is concentrated in the towns of Tarakeswar and Bishnupur, Bankura, near Kolkata, West Bengal, India.	Made by separating the curds from the whey with lemon juice. It is then molded, drained in small baskets, and smoked.
Paneer		The origin of paneer is debated. Ancient Indian, Afghan-Iranian and Portuguese-Bengali origins have been proposed for paneer. Paneer is now widespread in most of the Indian subcontinent.	A fresh cheese common in South Asian cuisine. In eastern parts of Indian subcontinent, it is generally called Chhana. It is an unaged, acid-set, non-melting farmer cheese made by curdling heated full-fat milk(mostly buffalo) with lemon juice, yogurt, vinegar, or any other food acids.
Khoa: Batti; Chikna; Daane; Pindi; Dhap		A dairy food widely used in the cuisines of the Indian subcontinent, encompassing India, Nepal, Bangladesh, Punjab, and Pakistan	Khoa is a type of cheese made by boiling and reducing milk until it becomes a thick, sticky mass. It is often used in Indian sweets such as barfi and gulab jamun and has a sweet, nutty taste.
Chhana		Produced mostly in eastern Indian states of Odisha and West Bengal; it is the chief ingredient of many Bengali sweets.	A fresh, unripened curd cheese made from cow or water buffalo milk. A crumbly and moist form of paneer, it is used to make desserts such as rosogolla (রসগোল্লা). It is used in various Hindu religious rituals. The earliest reference of cheese in India dates back to 1400 BCE.
Dahi Chhana		It was generally homemade in Odisha households of the Cuttack region, but its production has now become very rare.	Very similar to chhana in texture, it has a deep, reddish-brown color, and is more distinctly flavorful. It is rich in whey protein. It is produced from traditional buttermilk, and a large quantity of milk is required to produce even small amounts of Dahi Chhana. It has a long shelf life, and can be kept in earthen sikkas for months.
Kalari		Originated from Chenani in the union territory of Jammu and Kashmir.	Also known as Kiladi or Maish Krej (Kashmiri: ميش کريج,).
Kalimpong cheese		Originates from Kalimpong, a hill station in the Indian state of West Bengal.	When unripe, Kalimpong cheese is a little like the Welsh Caerphilly, slightly acidic and a little crumbly with a relatively smooth (edible) rind and not particularly strong-smelling.
Qudam		Originates from the Gujjar tribes of Kashmir.	

=== Indonesia ===
Name	Image	Region	Description
Dangke		Enrekang Regency, South Sulawesi	Dangke is a cheese made from buffalo milk using a traditional process; it is known for having quite high protein and β-carotene content.

=== Japan ===
Name	Image	Region	Description
Sakura cheese		Created in Hokkaidō, Japan	A soft cheese that is creamy white and flavored with mountain cherry leaves. Sakura means "cherry blossom" in Japanese.

=== Korea ===
Name	Image	Region	Description
Imsil		Imsil Cheese Village is located near the town of Imsil (within the county of Imsil). It provides vacation programs for children and tourists, with programs lasting for one day or more, in which guests learn how to make cheese.	The cheese produced in Imsil Cheese Village is called Imsil cheese, following the county name.

=== Malaysia ===
Name	Image	Region	Description
Susu Masam		Kuala Berang, Terengganu	A rare delicacy made from fermented buffalo's milk originated particularly from Kuala Berang area in the state of Terengganu. The milk is fermented inside a bamboo for one night or up to 3 days until the milk is mostly or completely solidified. The taste of the susu masam is described as creamy and sour similarly to yogurt. Susu masam is commonly eaten with rice and budu. It can also be eaten on its own or with sugar.

=== Mongolia ===
There are two types of Mongolian cheese (бяслаг). They are similar in taste and are like a cross between mozzarella and an unsalted feta cheese.

- түүхий сүүний – this is a creamy version of Mongolian cheese made by boiling the milk and keeping the cream top.
- болсон сүүний – this is similar but is made without the cream.

Name	Image	Region	Description
Byaslag			Prepared with cow or yak milk, this cheese has a lumpish curd and is somewhat sour in flavor.

=== Nepal ===
Name	Image	Region	Description
Flower of Rajya			A firm yak's-milk cheese made in Nepal by Tibetan nomads in collaboration with the Trace Foundation. Milk is heated and ripened in big copper vats, curdled, drained and molded into 10–12 pound wheels. The cheese is dry-cured in Tibetan red salt, aged, then wrapped in scarves and packed in bamboo baskets.
Chhurpi			A yak's-milk cheese, influenced by Tibetan cuisine. Depending on how it is prepared, Chhurpi can be either hard and chewy, or soft.

=== Philippines ===
Name	Image	Region	Description
Kesong puti			A soft, white cheese, made from unskimmed carabao's milk, salt and rennet. It has a soft, close texture and slight salty taste.

== Europe ==
=== Albania ===
Name	Image	Region	Description
Djathë i bardhë			Named after its color, it is a variation of the Balkanic sirene. One of the most popular types of cheese in Albania, widely used as an appetizer or side dish. Village salad and byrek are the most known recipes where djathë i bardhë is used, but it is also served fried, or baked in terracotta dishes with peppers and tomatoes. Djathë i bardhë is commonly eaten as meze, a term used for appetizers that are served with alcoholic beverages, most prominently, raki.
Kaçkavall			In Albania, kaçkavall is the most popular type of cheese after djathë i bardhë (white cheese). It is considered a traditional Albanian cheese, and is widely used as a side dish. A great majority of traditional restaurants will bring plates of raw or fried kaçkavall for no additional cost before the main dishes finish cooking. All dairy companies in Albania produce kaçkavall and mainly use cow's or sheep's milk.
Djathë pice			
Gjizë			Gjizë is a whey cheese very similar to curd or cottage cheese. It is usually salted and it is one of the most used ingredients for byrek. Its taste can be compared to ricotta when served unsalted. Most Albanians consider gjizë as the creamy version of djathë i bardhë.
Urdhë			Unaged cheese produced by boiling whey.

=== Austria ===
Name	Image	Region	Description
Bachensteiner			
Bergkäse			A group of cheeses produced in the Alps.
Brimsen			An Austrian term for Bryndza.
Gelundener Käse			
Lüneberg cheese		Made in mountain valleys in Vorarlberg in western Austria	A cow's-milk cheese.
Montafoner Sauerkäse			The Montafoner Sauerkäse (dialect: Sura Kees or in the Walgau and Rhine Valley Sura Käs) is a cheese made of soured-milk and has its origins in the Vorarlberger Montafon. Sour milk cheese is a lean cheese, so its fat content is very low. The protein content, however, does not suffer from fat loss due to the cream sabot. It is known in Vorarlberg since the 12th century and is similar to the Tyrolean grey cheese.
Mondseer			Made from pasteurized milk, Mondseer is a semi-solid cheese similar to Muenster cheese or Limburger. The surface is brushed by hand with salt water red smear, and maturation takes four to six weeks. The fat content is 45%. It has a mild to slightly spicy aroma and a sweet and sour taste. Its natural rind is yellow-orange in color.
Moosbacher			Moosbacher has been described as "part Emmental-style swiss and part washed-rind stinker".
Staazer			Staazer is a semi-hard cheese made from raw cow's milk from Austria. Staazer is made from hay milk, i.e. the cows that give the milk for the Staazer are fed exclusively with grass and herbs from the pasture in summer and exclusively with hay in winter. There is no silage feeding or feeding with fermentation hay. This special, natural feeding makes the milk, and later the cheese, particularly aromatic. The cheese matures for at least 3 months. Staazer has a round loaf shape weighing about 6 kg. The dough is pale yellow, the consistency is compact with few fermentation holes. The taste is aromatic and mildly creamy. In addition to the regular Staazer, there are also the varieties: Staazer with wild garlic - 50% fat (Staazer cheese with wild garlic in the dough) Staazer with hay flowers – 45% fat (Staazer cheese with dried hay flowers on the rind)
Steirerkäse			
Tyrolean grey (Tiroler Graukäse)		Made in the Zillertal, Austria	A strongly flavored, rennet-free cows-milk cheese, it owes its name to the grey mould that usually grows on its rind. It is extremely low in fat (around 0.5%), yet it has a powerful penetrating smell.

=== Belgium ===
Name	Image	Region	Description
Brussels cheese			Made from cow's milk, it has a smooth texture and a sharp and citrus flavor, along with a strong and salty bite.
Chimay cheeses			Brands, and varieties, of cheeses produced by Chimay Brewery, some soaked in Chimay Ale.
Herve cheese			An aged cheese made from unpasteurized cow's milk. It is traditionally aged in humid caves.
Le Wavreumont		Made by Fromagerie des Ardennes, which is in Ferrières, Belgium	Produced from cow's milk, this cheese is semi-soft and its coloration varies from yellow to ivory depending upon the season in which its produced.
Limburger cheese			Originated during the 19th century in the historical Duchy of Limburg, which is now divided among modern-day Belgium, Germany, and Netherlands. The cheese is especially known for its pungent odor. One of the most traditional forms of eating Limburger is the Limburger sandwich.
Maredsous cheese		Produced at Maredsous Abbey in Denée, Belgium	A loaf-shaped cheese made from cow's milk. The cheese is lightly pressed, then washed in brine to create the firm, orange crust and pungent aroma.
Passendale cheese		Passendale, Belgium	Named after Passendale, the village where it originated, it is one of the best-known cheeses in Belgium. It resembles a loaf of bread and has a round shape and a hard, but edible brown rind with spots of white. Inside, the flesh is golden, dotted with small holes and very creamy. It has a firm and damp consistency, slightly sweet bouquet and mild flavor. The regular Passendale cheese exists in two variations called Passendale Classic and Passendale Prelude.
Remoudou		Land of Herve, Belgium	It derives its name from the use of milk removed 15 minutes after the usual milking. Hence the wallon verb rimoûd meaning to re-milk. This cheese weighs 200 to 500g. When it is washed with salt it gets a strong taste, and when it is washed with milk it keeps a mild taste. It is often sold in pieces.
Rodoric		Liège, Belgium	An aged cheese made from unpasteurized goat milk that is traditionally aged in humid caves. When young, the interior is sweet, with age the flavor becomes spicy.
Nazareth		Nazareth, Belgium	A Belgian hard cheese made from cow's milk, named after the village of the same name. It is now manufactured by Belgomilk, which is part of the Milcobel group. The cheese, which can be identified by its dark brown rind, has a mildly subtle flavour. Quick restaurants have rapidly made a collaboration to serve some "kaas croketten" available in 5 or 13 pièces in every Quick in Belgium.

=== Bosnia and Herzegovina ===
Name	Image	Region	Description
Livno cheese		Livno, Bosnia and Herzegovina	The cheese is ready after an average of 60 to 66 days in a controlled environment. The flavor is full, and in older cheeses the taste is slightly piquant. The largest producer is Mljekara Livno or Lura Dairy d.o.o. Livno, with yearly production exceeding 500 metric tons.
Herzegovina "squeaking" cheese		Trebinje, Ivanica, Slavogostići, Gacko in southern Herzegovina, Bosnia and Herzegovina	Another existing variety of Squeaking cheese from Lika in Croatia is often smoked.
Trappista cheese		Banja Luka, Bosnia and Herzegovina	Trappista or Trapist is a traditional Bosnian semi-hard cow's-milk cheese made by Trappists branch of Cistercians order of Mariastern abbey in Banja Luka, Bosnia and Herzegovina.
Vlašić / Travnički cheese		Travnik, Bosnia and Herzegovina	This cheese is produced on Vlašić mountain in central Bosnia, above the city of Travnik. It was originally made from sheep milk, but there are varieties made from cow milk or mixture of both. This is brined mostly low-fat cheese, white in color, and can either have small irregular holes scattered in it, or be solid without holes. When drained from brine its taste can be dry and quite salty. The milk has a special flavor that comes from the variety of different herbs that sheep are eating while grazing on the mountain.
Bosnian smoked cheese		Vareš, Olovo, Tuzla, central to northeastern Bosnia, Bosnia and Herzegovina	Bosnian smoked cheese (also known as Serbo-Croatian: Suhi sir or Dimljeni sir) is a type of very dry piquant low-fat smoked cheese originating from Bosnia and Herzegovina. It is usually home-made product, but industrial production also exists.

=== Bulgaria ===
Name	Image	Region	Description
Cherni Vit		Cherni Vit, Teteven Municipality, Lovech Province	Made from sheep milk, Cherni Vit cheese owes the green color of its crust and its characteristic taste to the formation of mold. This occurs naturally due to the specific conditions in the region and the technology of production. Produced for centuries, Cherni Vit cheese was nearly extinct in the 2000s until it was rediscovered and popularized by Slow Food representatives.
Urdă/Izvara			Urdă/Izvara is made from whey of sheep, goat or cow milk. It is produced by heating the whey resulting from the draining of any type of cheese. It is often made into molds to the shape of a half sphere. The paste is finely grained, silky and palatable. It contains 18 grams of protein per 100 grams. Urdă/Izvara is similar to ricotta in the way it is produced.
Kashkaval			A type of yellow cheese made of sheep milk, cow milk or goat milk. In Albania, Bulgaria, Moldova, North Macedonia, Serbia and Romania, the term is often used to refer to all yellow cheeses (or even any cheese other than sirene).
Sirene			A type of brine cheese made in South-Eastern Europe, especially popular in Serbia, Bulgaria, Romania, Albania, North Macedonia, Greece and Israel. It is made of goat milk, sheep milk, cow's milk or a combination of milks. It is slightly crumbly with a fat content of about 30–35%. It is commonly produced in blocks, and has a slightly grainy texture.

=== Croatia ===
Name	Image	Region	Description
Paški sir		Island of Pag	A hard, distinctively flavored sheep milk cheese. It is generally regarded as the most famous of Croatian artisan cheeses and is found in many export markets outside Croatia, also known as Godsips cheese.
Paška skuta		Island of Pag	Paška skuta is a traditional Croatian ricotta-type cheese produced on the island of Pag. The skuta is made from leftover whey after the production of the Paški sir.
Škripavac		Lika	Cheese from Lika made from raw cows' milk. The cheese is named after the Croatian word for squeaky, because škripavac makes a distinctive sound when bitten into it.
Basa		Lika	Basa is a fresh soft cheese from Lika. It is prepared from mixed sheep's and cow's milk.
Krčki sir		Island of Krk	Hard, full-fat cheese made from raw sheep's milk.
Grobnički sir		Grobnik	Grobnički sir is produced in the Grobnik valley, near the city of Rijeka.
Dinarski sir		Dinara	Hard cheese produced in the Dinaric mountain region made from a combination of cow’s and goat’s milk.
Dinarski sir iz maslinove komine		Dinara	Dinarski sir iz maslinove komine is a hard cheese originating from the Dalmatian hinterlands around Dinara mountain. It is made from a combination of cow’s and goat’s milk. The cheese is aged for at least 4 months in pressed olive skins.
Sir iz mišine		Dalmantian hinterland	Traditional cheese from Dalmatian hinterland, Velebit and part of Lika. It is made from sheep's, goat's or mixed milk.
Težački sir iz maslinove komine		Dalmatian hinterland	Težački sir iz maslinove komine is a Croatian hard cheese originating from the Dalmatian hinterland.
Lećevački sir		Split	Lećevački sir is characteristic of the Split hinterland, and is produced from cow's, sheep's or mixed milk.
Liburnski sir		Island of Pag	Liburnski sir is a Croatian cheese hailing from the region of old Liburnia.
Istarska skuta		Istria	White curd cheese made from full-fat cow's milk or sheep's milk from Istria.
Dubrovački sir		Dubrovnik	Hard sheep's cheese, bright soft rind due to the mold made of elastic koščela wood.
Tounjski sir		Tounj	Smoked cheese from Tounj near Ogulin.
Prgica		Varaždin	Smoked cheese from Varaždin.
Dimsi		Zagreb	Smoked cheese from Zagreb based on Bjelovarac cheese.
Caprilo		Varaždin	Caprillo is a soft, fatty goat cheese. It has a mild but irresistible taste with snow-white mold on the surface.
Capron		Varaždin	Soft, fatty goat's milk cheese specific in that its ripening takes place under the red pulp, which is why a specific red coating develops on the surface.
Ovidur		Varaždin	Hard cheese made from sheep's milk that is produced in the north of Croatia, and which is sent for ripening at the foot of Velebit, which gives it a specific final taste.
Zdenka		Daruvar	Soft, processed cheese made from cow's milk hard cheese that is produced in the north of Croatia, by the Czech community in Daruvar, with strong roots in Slavic dairymaking.

=== Cyprus ===
Name	Image	Region	Description
Akkawi			Commonly made using cow milk, but can be made with goat or sheep's milk, it has a smooth texture and a mild salty taste. It is now produced on a large scale in the Middle East, notably in Israel, Palestine, Lebanon, Syria and Cyprus.
Anari cheese			A fresh mild whey cheese produced in Cyprus. Although much less known than other Cypriot cheeses (e.g. halloumi), it has started to gain popularity following recent publicity exposure. The whey used is usually a by-product in the production process of other harder cheeses, commonly that of halloumi or kefalotyri cheese.
Halloumi			A Cypriot semi-hard, unripened brined cheese made from a mixture of goat and sheep milk, and sometimes also cow milk. It has a high melting point and so can easily be fried or grilled. It is noted for its ability to retain its shape under direct heat, or as a "grillable" cheese.
Kefalotyri			A hard, salty yellow cheese made from sheep or goat's milk in Greece and Cyprus. Depending on the mixture of milk used in the process the color can vary between yellow and white.

=== Czech Republic ===
Name	Image	Region	Description
Abertam cheese			A traditional Czech cheese made from sheep milk. It has the shape of an irregular ball with thin yellow to orange natural rind. It is used as a table cheese or for melting.
Blaťácké zlato			A traditional Czech soft cheese made from cow milk, similar Bel Paese.
Olomoucké syrečky		Loštice, Czech Republic	A soft cheese.
Hermelín		Prague, Czech Republic	

=== Denmark ===
Name	Image	Region	Description
Danbo		Funen	A semi-soft, aged cow's milk cheese, and a common household cheese in Denmark. The cheese is typically aged between 12 and 52 weeks in rectangular blocks of 6 or 9 kg, coated with a bacterial culture. The culture is washed off at the end of the aging cycle, and the cheese is packaged for retail sales.
Danablu		Øverød, Zealand	Danablu (Danish Blue) is a strong, blue-veined cheese. This semi-soft creamery cheese is typically drum or block shaped and has a white to yellowish, slightly moist, edible rind. Made from full fat cow's milk and homogenised cream, it has a fat content of 25–30% and is aged for eight to twelve weeks.
Esrom		Esrum, Zealand	Esrom, or Danish Port Salut cheese, is a Trappist-style pale yellow semi-soft cow's milk cheese with a pungent aroma and a full, sweet flavour. It is a porous cheese, with many small holes throughout, and is slightly elastic and buttery in texture.
Fynbo		Funen	A semi-hard Danish cheese named after the island of Fyn. It has a flavor of buckwheat and is processed with a combination of mesophilic and thermophilic bacterial cultures.
Havarti		Øverød, Zealand	Also known as cream Havarti, a semi-soft cow's milk cheese made like most cheeses by introducing rennet to milk to cause curdling. The curds are pressed into cheese molds which are drained, and then the cheese is aged. It is a washed curd cheese, which contributes to the subtle flavor. It is interior-ripened, rindless, smooth and slightly bright-surfaced. It has very small and irregular openings ("eyes") distributed in the mass. Havarti has a buttery aroma and can be somewhat sharp in the stronger varieties, much like Swiss cheese. The taste is buttery, and from somewhat sweet to very sweet, and it is slightly acidic.
Maribo		Lolland	A semi-hard cheese made from cow's milk. It has a firm, dry interior; a creamy texture; and many small, irregular holes. It has a pale tan rind covered in yellow wax. Its flavour is tangy, and it is sometimes seasoned with caraway seeds.
Molbo		Mols	A semi-hard cow's milk cheese made in the region of Mols. It is very similar to Edam, with a delicate, light flavour that is slightly tangy and salty. It has small, regular holes and is covered in a red wax coating.
Saga		Tolstrup, Jutland	A mix of blue cheese and brie, creamy, blue-veined cheese with a white-mould rind. Saga is a very mild blue-veined cheese. It comes with a delicate blue mold, that may not appear in other varieties of blue cheeses. It is aged for more than 60 days.
Samsø cheese		Samsø	A cow's milk cheese named after the island of Samsø. It is similar to Emmentaler, although its flavour is milder: gentle and nutty in young cheeses and pungent with sweet and sour notes in older ones. Samsø's interior has a supple, elastic texture; a yellow colour; and a few large, irregular holes. It is the national cheese of Denmark.
Tybo		Thy, Jutland	A cow's milk cheese, similar to a mild Samsø. It is loaf-shaped, with a cream-colored, holey interior and a yellow rind. It has a slightly salty, smooth, and lactic flavor.
Vesterhavsost		Thise, Northwest Jutland	A semi-soft cow's milk cheese with briny and caramelly tasting notes, it is comparable to Gouda.

=== Estonia ===
Name	Image	Region	Description
Atleet			Semi hard cheese with little sour flavor made from cow's milk, produced by Valio.
Eesti Juust			Semi hard Dutch-type cheese made from cow's milk, produced by Estover.
Kadaka juust		Saaremaa	Semi hard smoked cheese made from cow's milk, produced by Saaremaa Piimatööstus. Also available with garlic.

=== Finland ===
Name	Image	Region	Description
Aura		Äänekoski, Finland	Blue cheese made from cow's milk, produced by Valio.
Lappi		Lapland	Made from partially skimmed cow's milk, similar to Emmental except that it is pasteurized.
Leipäjuusto		Southern Ostrobothnia, Kainuu	Fresh cheese made from cow's beestings. Sometimes made from goat or reindeer milk.
Oltermanni			Semisoft cow's milk cheese, similar to Danish Havarti, both types are called kermajuusto ("cream cheese") in Finland. Produced by Valio.
Raejuusto			Fresh cheese made from cow's milk, similar to cottage cheese.

=== France ===
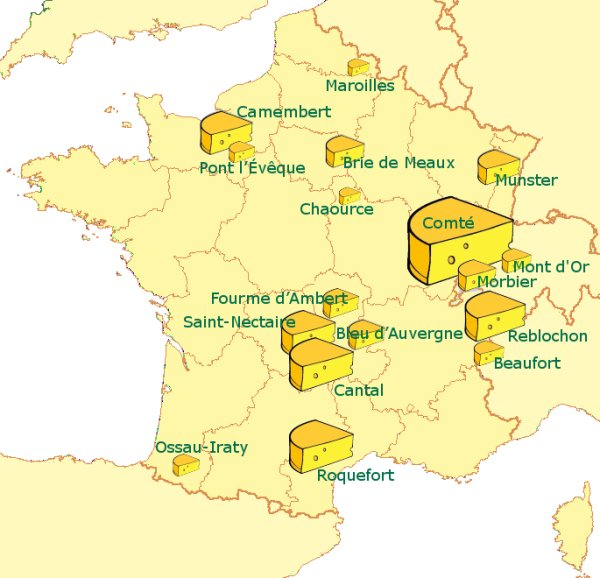
A map of major French AOC cheeses – the size of the symbol equates to the size of production

=== Germany ===
Germany's cheese production accounts for approximately one-third of all European-produced cheeses.

=== Greece ===
Name	Image	Region	Description
Anthotyros			A traditional fresh cheese. There are Dry Anthotyros and Fresh Anthotyros. Dry Anthotyros is a matured cheese similar to Mizithra. Anthotyros is made with milk and whey from sheep or goats, sometimes in combination. The ratio of milk to whey usually is 9-to-1. It is commonly a truncated cone, but when shipped in containers may be crumbled, as it is removed. It may be unpasteurized, where law allows.
Chloro		Santorini	
Feta		PDO – Epirus, Macedonia, Thrace, Thessaly, Peloponnese, Lesbos	Feta is a brined curd white cheese made only in Greece. It is made from sheep's milk, or from a mixture of sheep and goat's milk. The word "feta" in Greek means "slice".
Graviera		PDO – Agrafa, Crete, Naxos	Graviera is a type of Greek hard yellow cheese. It is made exclusively from sheep or goat milk.
Kasseri		PDO – Macedonia, Thrace, Thessaly, Lesbos	
Kefalograviera		PDO – Crete, Sterea Ellada	
Kefalotyri			
Kopanisti		PDO – Cyclades	
Malaka		Crete	Also known as Tiromalama. Made from Graviera curd.
Manouri		PDO – Thessaly	
Metsovone		PDO – Metsovo, Epirus	
Myzithra		Crete	
Tyrozouli		Crete	Made from Myzithra by adding salt, causing dehydration, and allowing maturation.
Xynomizithra		PDO – Crete, Mykonos, Paros	
Xynotyro		Mykonos	
Other PDO cheeses			Formaela (Arachova), Galotyri (Thessaly, Epirus), Kalathaki (Limnos), Katiki (Domokos), Ladotyri (Lesbos), Pichtogalo Chanion (Chania), Sfela (Peloponnese), Xygalo (Crete)

=== Hungary ===
Name	Image	Region	Description
Gran Castelli			A hard ripened cheese
Liptauer or Körözött			A spicy cheese spread made with sheep milk cheese, goat's milk cheese, quark cheese or cottage cheese.
Orda			Made from whey
Pálpusztai			Pálpusztai is a Hungarian soft cow's milk cheese, known for its pungent odor.
Trappista cheese			Trappista is a traditional Hungarian, Bosnian and Serbian semi-hard cow's-milk cheese. It has a mild flavor and melts easily.
Oázis			Smoked cheese
Balaton cheese			A semi-hard, mild, yellow cheese made from cow's milk.
Karaván			Karaván is a smoked Hungarian cow's milk cheese.
Pannónia			Pannónia Emmentaler is a Hungarian version of the Swiss Emmenthal cheese.

=== Iceland ===
Name	Image	Region	Description
Höfðingi			A type of Icelandic cheese, described as a "creamy-soft, almost runny cheese with a white rind/crust and a smooth, mild flavor".

=== Jews of Eastern Europe ===
Name	Image	Region	Description
Fried Camembert cheese		Eastern Poland, Galicia (Eastern Europe), Belarus, and the Vilnius Region (alongside Kaunas), Lithuania.	It is made of cow milk and usually added to salads or eaten alone.

=== Kosovo ===
Name	Image	Region	Description
Šar cheese		Gora, Opolje, Štrpce, in the Šar Mountains, Kosovo	It is made of sheep and cow milk and usually added to salads and main dishes, pitas, served with bread or eaten alone.

=== Latvia ===
Name	Image	Region	Description
Jāņi cheese			It is a mixture of raw quark and fresh milk, but other products can be added.
Latvian cheese			A type of cheese with a strong specific aroma modeled after the Limburger.

=== Lithuania ===
- Džiugas

=== Luxembourg ===
Name	Image	Region	Description
Cancoillotte			Made from Metton, a cow's milk cheese from the Franche-Comte region of France (where Cancoillotte also originally comes from), it's a local cheese speciality. A staple of each Luxembourgish meal. Usually called kachkéis here.
Crème de Chapelain			Another local processed cheese specialty, similar to kachkéis.
Fromage Gouda de biére du Battin			A local version of the beloved Dutch cheese made from unpasteurized cow's milk. It is also inspired by the Belgian monastery cheeses, as it was largely influenced by the Flemish cheesemakers that came to Luxembourg to make cheese.

=== Malta ===
Name	Image	Region	Description
Ġbejna		Commonly associated with the island of Gozo	A small round cheese made from sheep's milk, salt and rennet, Ġbejniet are prepared and served in a variety of forms. Until the early 20th century, ġbejniet made from unpasteurised milk were one of the causes of the spread of Brucellosis which was so prevalent as to be called "the Maltese fever".

=== Moldova ===
Name	Image	Region	Description
Cașcaval			A type of yellow cheese made of sheep milk. In the Moldova the term is often used to refer to all yellow cheeses.
Urdă			An unaged whey cheese
Brânză			A salty brined cheese made from sheep milk.
Brânză de vaci			Made from whole (regular) cow milk without additives such as rennet. It has a dry, crumbly texture, and takes a spherical shape from the cheesecloth in which the cheese was strained from whey.

=== Montenegro ===
Name	Image	Region	Description
Kolašinski sir			A type of soft "Leafy" cheese made of cow milk, produced in Northern Montenegro town of Kolašin. This is a cow milk cheese exclusive to the Central North region, more specifically, around Kolašin town. This is due to the specific composition of flora that free-ranging cows feed upon on the upland pastures, as well as to the microclimatic conditions of the locality. The attempts to make this cheese elsewhere following the same recipe have failed. The producers from this region are proud of their cheese, and for years have been trying to initialize the procedure for the protection of geographic origin. This cheese is very valued as a delicacy in whole of Montenegro, and it is one of the most expensive fresh cheeses on the national market. The name of this cheese is derived from its specific texture. Thin, sometimes almost transparent, layers create a leafy structure, and make strings when the cheese is pulled apart. It has a pleasant mild fragrance. It does not contain high levels of fat, so its taste is mild and light.All producers make it in a similar manner, although every family has their own small secret that distinguishes their cheese, of which they are rather protective. What is known is that this cheese is made by combining the skimmed and whole cow milk. After adding the rennet, which makes milk curd, the cheese is drained and then frequently turned and folded. It is this manipulation that creates thin layers – leaves – that give it a characteristic texture.
Pljevaljski sir			A type of best semisoft cheese made of cow milk, produced in Northern Montenegro town of Pljevlja. Cheese from Pljevlja is a ubiquitous part of Montenegrin meal. It is white cheese made from unpasteurized cow milk. The characteristic flavour comes from the maturation process that takes place in special wooden barrel-like containers. The cheese matures for at least three weeks until it achieves its characteristic strong flavour and creamy texture. Currently, there is an ongoing procedure for protection of geographic origin for this cheese.
Podgorički sir			A salty brined cheese made from cow milk.Also named "Kučki sir", made in Southern Montenegro city of Podgorica.
Nikšićki kozji sir			Made from best whole goat milk, produced in Western Montenegro town of Nikšić.
Njeguški sir			In the Southern Montenegro town of Cetinje surroundings at Njeguši the famous cheese of Njeguši is produced. It is being kept at shaded in airy places up to 3 months before degustation. Dried and rich in cow milk fats – simply exquisite.

=== Netherlands ===
The Netherlands is one of the major cheese producing countries of Europe, with a tradition of cheesemaking as shown by the Dutch cheese markets.

=== North Macedonia ===
Name	Image	Region	Description
Kashkaval			A type of yellow cheese made of sheep milk. In North Macedonia the term is often used to refer to all yellow cheeses (or even any cheese other than Сирење). In English-language menus "кашкавал" is translated as "yellow cheese" (whereas sirene is usually translated as "white cheese" or simply "cheese"). The taste of the kashkaval is sometimes compared to that of the United Kingdom's cheddar cheese, although variations exist.
Urdă			An unaged whey cheese
Belo Sirenje			A type of brine cheese produced in North Macedonia called "white cheese" or simply "cheese". It is made of goat milk, sheep milk, cow's milk or a combination of milks. It is slightly crumbly with a fat content of 30–35%. It is commonly produced in blocks, and has a slightly grainy texture.

=== Norway ===
Name	Image	Region	Description
Brunost			A caramelized brown Scandinavian whey cheese. Brunost (brown cheese) is commonly used instead of mysost (whey cheese), which is the correct name. Another variant, made using goat milk, is referred to and sold as geitost (Norwegian for "goat cheese") or, in an older Dano-Norwegian spelling no longer used in Norway, as gjetost. Geitost is made from a mixture of goat's and cow's milk; ekte geitost (real geitost) is made with goat's milk only.
Gamalost			A sour cheese made from skimmed cow's milk
Geitost			Goat's milk variety of Brunost
Heidal cheese			A Norwegian brunost named after the parish of Heidal in the northern part of the Gudbrand Valley.
Jarlsberg cheese			A mild cow's-milk cheese with large regular holes
Nøkkelost			A semi-hard, yellow cow's milk cheese flavored with cumin and cloves
Norvegia			A Norwegian cow's milk cheese produced by Tine
Pultost			A soft, mature sour milk cheese flavored with caraway seeds, it is found in two variants, spreadable and grainy
Snøfrisk			A goat cheese made by Tine

=== Poland ===
The history of cheesemaking in Poland goes back to 5500 BC, when cheese similar to mozzarella was produced in Neolithic times in Kujawy (north-central Poland).

Poland is the 7th largest cheese producer in the world and has the 18th highest cheese consumption.

Marek Kosmulski described over 600 types of Polish cheeses manufactured between 1948 and 2019.

Name	Image	Region	Description
Bałtycki			Polish brand of cheese.
Bryndza			Sheep milk cheese made in Poland, Slovakia. Recipes differ slightly across the countries.
Bryndza Podhalańska		Podhale region.	Polish variety of the soft cheese bryndza. It is prepared with sheep milk and was registered in the European Union's Register of protected designations of origin and protected geographical indications on 11 June 2007 as a Protected Designation of Origin (PDO).
Bundz		Traditionally produced in Podhale.	A sheep milk cheese.
Bursztyn			A brand of cheese. It is a mature cheese similar to Gruyere.
Edamski		Mazuria.	A rennet cheese based on Dutch Edammer.
Farmer cheese			In Poland, farmer cheese is similar in consistency to cottage cheese. The cheese is formed into a loaf. It is sometimes referred to as "pot cheese."
Gołka		Silesian Voivodeship.	Similar to oscypek, but made with milk from cattle.
Gryficki		Gryfice Dairy, province of Szczecin.	Production began in 1973.
Hauskyjza		Wielkopolska, Pomerania, Kuyavia, and Silesia.	Foodstuff made of cottage cheese, caraway and other ingredients, which are mixed, put aside for a few days to acquire the characteristic sharp flavor and tacky consistency, and then warmed and fried.
Kortowski			
Koryciński		Podlaskie Voivodeship in eastern Poland.	Hard yellow cheese made from cows' milk. Named after the town of Korycin.
Królewski		Northwestern Masovia.	"Royal cheese"; similar in taste and appearance to Swiss Emmental.
Liliput		Wielkopolska.	A cows' milk cheese.
Lechicki			Known in Poland as Brochocki cheese, which derives from the name of the farmer who began producing it.
Łowicki			
Lubuski			
Mazurski			A brand of cheese.
Morski			Mild, semi-soft cheese made from pasteurized cow's milk. Melts well, often used as a table cheese.
Oscypek		Made exclusively in the Tatra Mountains region of Poland.	Smoked sheep milk cheese, there is also a smaller form called redykołka, known as the 'younger sister' of oscypek.
Przeworski			A rennet cheese, classified as ripening, produced from cow's milk and an infusion of mint and marjoram. It has a delicately spicy taste and an aroma of herbs. Named after the town of Przeworsk in the Subcarpathian Voivodeship.
Radamer		From Polesie.	A cows' milk cheese, with Dutch and Swiss influence.
Redykołka		Produced in the Podhale region.	Sometimes known as the "younger sister" of Oscypek and the two are occasionally confused. The cheese is often made in the shape of animals, hearts, or decorative wreaths.
Rokpol		Wielkopolska.	Polish blue cheese similar to French blue cheeses. The name derives from Roquefort and suggests that it is a Polish Roquefort, however, it is made with cows' milk.
Słupski chłopczyk		Produced in Słupsk.	A Camembert-type cheese, produced before the second world war, reintroduced in 2007, but the production was stopped in 2013.
Twaróg			Also known as ser biały. Pictured is Polish twaróg in the traditional wedge shape.
Tylżycki		Mazuria.	A yellow cheese made from cow's milk. A semi-hard cheese that is a variety of Tilsiter.
Wielkopolski ser smażony		Wielkopolska.	A fried cheese served as a dip similar to fondue.
Zamojski			
Zgorzelecki			A semi-hard, yellow cheese made from cows' milk.

=== Portugal ===
Name	Image	Region	Description
Castelo Branco cheese (PDO)		Beira Baixa	A cheese named after the city of the same name in Portugal, the main city of the district where it is produced. The cheese is made from milk produced by either a goat or a ewe, and has a soft texture.
Queijo de Nisa (PDO)		Alto Alentejo	A semi-hard sheep's milk cheese from the municipality of Nisa. It is created from raw milk, which is coagulated, then curdled using an infusion of thistle.
Queijo do Pico (PDO)		Azores	Originating from the island of Pico, this cured cheese is produced in cylindrical formats from cow milk. It is considered a fatty cheese and the ripening of the cheese forms a yellow exterior irregular crust and yellowish-white, soft and pasty interior. Pico cheese has a salty taste and a characteristically intense aroma.
Queijo de Azeitão (PDO)		Azeitão, Setúbal	Sheep's milk cheese originating from the town of Azeitão.
São Jorge (PDO)		Azores	Produced in the São Jorge Island, this is a hard/semi-hard cheese made from unpasteurised cow's milk, and the pâte has small eyes.
Serra da Estrela (PDO)		Serra da Estrela	Produced in a mountainous region this cheese is made from sheep's milk, mostly during the months of November to March. The texture of the paste varies depending on its age, from a very soft semi-liquid when young, to a soft but sliceable solid when older. It is a cured cheese created by artisanal producers with a white or slightly yellow color and a uniform creamy consistency with at most a few small holes in it.
Trás-os-Montes (PDO)		Trás-os-Montes	A goat cheese from Alto Trás-os-Montes, Norte Region, Portugal.
Requeijão			A milk-derived product produced in Portugal, it is sometimes called requesón (the Spanish word for ricotta) in English-speaking countries. It is a loose, ricotta-like cheese used to make cheese spreads.
Saloio (Brand)			
Santarém cheese			
Serpa cheese			

=== Romania ===
Name	Image	Region	Description
Brânză de burduf			A salty type of cheese prepared with sheep's-milk, it has a strong flavor and is slightly soft in texture. To obtain it, sweet caș is cut into small pieces, salted and then hand-mixed in a large wooden bowl. The mixture is then placed in a sheep's stomach, or into a sheep's skin that has been carefully cleaned and sawed on the edges, or in a tube made of pine bark.
Brânză de Suhaia			Suhaia cheese is a dairy product matured in brine, prepared in the neighboring territories of Suhaia commune and, predominantly, in Suhaia commune, Teleorman, Romania. The distinguishing feature of this type of cheese is the fact that the product is subjected to the technological operations of wet and dry salting, respectively, which gives not only a special taste, but also a longer shelf life.
Brânză de vaci (Brânză dulce)			Made from whole cow milk similar to cottage cheese.
Caș			Sweet non-fermented cheese obtained from cow's or sheep's milk. Drained in cheesecloth could be eaten fresh, smoked, or further prepared into brânză de burduf.
Cașcaval			Cașcaval is used to refer to a number of types of yellow medium and semi hard cheeses made of sheep's or cow's-milk.
Năsal cheese			Năsal is a traditional Romanian cheese bearing the same name as the village where it is produced in the Țaga commune, Cluj County. It is a smear-ripened cheese made from cow's milk.
Telemea			Sweet to extremely salty cheese obtained from cow's or sheep's raw or pasteurized milk. Two main categories: fresh – available seasonally and preserved -available year around. Fresh telemea is soft, and in various degrees of saltiness. Preserved telemea is harder and salt saturated due to its brine preservation. Preserved telemea is almost identical to Greek Feta cheese.
Urdă			Sweet, soft, with a sandy texture cheese obtained from boiled whey of cow or sheep milk, almost identical to Italian ricotta cheese.

=== Russia ===
Name	Image	Region	Description
Circassian cheese		Adyghea	A crumbly non-melting and mild fresh cheese that is produced in the North Caucasus. It is a cultural cheese and staple for Circassians that is very famous in Russia (Republic of Adyghea, Kabardino-Balkaria, Karachay–Cherkessia, Shapsugia in the southern part of Krasnodar Krai, Stavropol Krai, North Ossetia, Moscow, and Saint Petersburg), and the Middle east countries (Jordan, Turkey, Lebanon, Syria, Israel) and worldwide (mainly countries that have a North Caucasians and Circassians Diaspora/s).
Korall			A soft, processed cheese made of cow's milk
Russian cheese			similar to German Tilsiter
Tvorog (творог)			Similar to cottage cheese, version without cream.

=== Serbia ===
Name	Image	Region	Description
Kačkavalj			A type of stretched-curd cheese made out of sheep's or cow's milk. Pictured is Kačkavalj (Caciocavallo) cheese hanged to mature (Serbia)
Pule cheese			Reportedly the world's most expensive cheese, it is prepared from the milk of Balkan donkeys from Serbia.

- Sremski
- Zlatarski PDO
- Sjenički
- Krivovirski Kačkavalj
- Homoljski ovčiji (Homolje sheep cheese)
- Homoljski kozji (Homolje goat cheese)
- Homoljski kravlji (Homolje cow cheese)
- Pirotski Kačkavalj
- Lužnička Vurda
- Užički Kajmak
- Čačanski Kajmak
- Čačanski Sir

=== Slovakia ===
Name	Image	Region	Description
Bryndza			A sheep milk cheese made in Poland, Slovakia and Ukraine. Recipes differ slightly across the countries.
Liptauer			A spicy cheese spread made with sheep milk cheese, goat's milk cheese, quark cheese or cottage cheese.
Ovčia hrudka			
Kravská hrudka			
Korbáčiky		Orava	A type of string cheese made from steamed cheese interwoven into fine braids. Common flavors include salty, smoked and garlic.
Oštiepok			A traditional Slovakian smoked sheep milk cheese, it is a protected trade name under the EU's protected geographical indication.
Parenica			A traditional Slovak cheese, it is a semi-firm, non-ripening, semi-fat, steamed and usually smoked cheese, although the non-smoked version is also produced. Parenica is cream and yellow in color, which is darkened by steaming. The cheese is produced in strips, which are woven into snail-like spirals.
Urda			
Tvaroh			
Encián			
Plesnivec			

=== Slovenia ===
Name	Image	Region	Description
Mohant			A soft cheese with a strong flavor.
Tolminc cheese		Tolmin	Made with raw cow milk, it has a sweet and spicy flavor. The cheese is registered as a Protected Designation of Origin.

- Bohinc Jože
- Nanoški
- Planinski

=== Sweden ===
Name	Image	Region	Description
Ädelost			A blue cheese made from pasteurized cow's milk. It has a light cream color with evenly distributed blue-gray veins and a sharp, salty flavor. The cheese has a slightly moldy rind.
Blå Gotland		Stånga	"Gotland Blue" is made in Sweden by the Arla Foods company in the town of Stånga on the island of Gotland. This cheese is often characterized as being somewhere between strong and mild, containing elements of both types. The color is a pale yellow, and it has no holes.
Grevé			A semi-hard Swedish cheese made from cow's milk. It is similar to Emmental with a mild and nutty taste. The cream-coloured cheese has a smooth and creamy texture with large holes. It contains 30–40% fat and takes 10 months to attain full ripeness.
Gräddost			
Herrgårdsost			A semi-hard cheese made from cow's milk. The aged cheese has a mild, sweet, nutty flavor and small round holes. It is aged for three or four months, but often up to 12 or even 24 months.
Hushållsost			A semi-hard cows'-milk cheese with small granular holes and aged around 60 days on average. The taste is described as mild yet somewhat sour.
Moose cheese		Bjurholm, Sweden	A cheese produced in Sweden from moose milk.
Prästost			Made from pasteurized cow's milk.
Svecia			A semi-hard cow's-milk cheese, with a creamy consistency, light yellow colour, small irregular holes, and a mildly acidic taste. The cheese is aged in a dry environment for at least two months, sometimes up to more than a year.
Västerbottensost		Burträsk	A hard cow's milk cheese with tiny eyes or holes and a firm and granular texture. Strong in flavour, its taste is described as somewhat like Parmesan cheese, salty, but with more bitter notes. Västerbotten cheese must be aged for at least 12 months.

=== Switzerland ===
Switzerland is home to over 450 varieties of cheese. Cows milk is used in about 99 percent of the cheeses produced. The remaining share is made up of sheep milk and goat milk.

=== Ukraine ===
Name	Image	Region	Description
Bilozhar			Rennet cheese 45% of fat in dry matter.
Bukovynskyi		Bukovina	A hard cheese (45% of fat in dry matter) made from cow's milk, it has moderate piquant cheese flavour and fruit and citrus aroma. The ageing period is 20 days.
Bryndza		Budjak, Bukovina, Ciscarpathia, Podolia, Transcarpathia	A sheep milk cheese made in Moldova, Poland, Slovakia and Ukraine. Recipes differ slightly across the countries. Pictured is Ukrainian Carpathian bryndza.
Dobrodar			Hard cheese 50% of fat in dry matter. Ageing period: 45 days.
Smetankovyi			A hard rennet cheese (50% of fat in dry matter) made from pasteurised milk with moderate sweetish cheese flavour with no piquancy, delicate creamy overtones, and small holes. Ageing period: 30 days.
Syr			A firm quark version, somewhat similar to cottage cheese. It is often called syr, although the name could refer to any cheese in general; to differentiate it from other cheeses, names kyslomolochnyi syr and domashnii syr are common.
Ukrainskyi			Hard cheese 50% of fat in dry matter.
Vurda		Hutsulshchyna	Sort of whey cheese.

=== United Kingdom ===
The British Cheese Board states that there are over 700 named British cheeses produced in the UK.

Name	Image	Region	Description
Banbury cheese		Banbury, Oxfordshire, England	Once one of Banbury's most prestigious exports, and nationally famous, its production went into decline by the 18th-century, and eventually ceased. The cheese is best known today through an insult in Shakespeare's Merry Wives of Windsor (1597). Pictured is a 15th/16th-century recipe for Banbury cheese.
Cauliflower Cheese			Typically served in Sunday roasts. A mix of cauliflower and melted cheese.
Cheddar cheese		Cheddar, Somerset	The UK's most famous cheese, and one of the most popular.
Stilton Cheese		Melton Mowbray, Leicestershire	Stilton is produced in two varieties: Blue, which has had Penicillium roqueforti added to generate a characteristic smell and taste, and White, which has not.
Wensleydale Cheese		Wensleydale, North Yorkshire	Wensleydale's most popular export. Commonly sold with cranberries added.
Stinking Bishop Cheese		Dymock, Gloucestershire	Perhaps the UK's most notorious cheese, known for its distinctive odour.
Red Leicester		Leicester, Leicestershire	A cheese similar to cheddar with a crumbly texture. It gets its orange colour from annatto extract during the manufacturing process.

== Middle East ==
=== Iran ===
Name	Image	Region	Description
Lighvan cheese		Liqvan	a brined curd cheese traditionally made in Iran. Having a sour flavor, and a shape covered by holes, the cheese is produced from sheep's milk. The name comes from Liqvan, a village in Tabriz, where it has traditionally been made.
Talesh cheese		Talesh	it can only be found in Talesh County. this cheese is made from goat or sheep milk. Once the cheese is processed, it is held in sheep or goat skin for aging and preservation.
Mahali cheese		Mazandaran	This cheese is very similar to Indian Paneer. It is made from full fat cow's milk. It tastes mild and is kept in salt brine.
Pot Cheese (kuzeh) کوزه	Kupe paniri	Urumia	Kuzeh Paniri or Kupe paniri or Pot Cheese is a form of salty cheese made of Cow's milk and stored in a pot or jug under the ground for fermentation. It is common in Northwest of Iran specially in cities of Khoy and Urumia. It is made by adding white vinegar to cooled down boiled milk and then gathering the curd and stuffing it in a pot or jug and then the pot is buried under the ground where water is sometimes added to the soil. Sesame seeds or fennel flower seeds and poppy seeds and black caraway is then added to taste better and also lots of salt, after at least 2 months being in the pot it is taken out and then sun dried.

=== Israel ===
Name	Image	Region	Description
Tzfatit Kashah	Hard aged Tzfat cheese in Tzfat, Palestine	Upper Galilee	Hard texture, savory flavor; perfect for grating on top of Shakshouka, Manakish, Burekas or on a baked dumpling called calsonas.
Tzfatit Triah	Fresh Tzfat Cheese	Upper Galilee	Mild flavor; texture ranges from creamy to firm, is preserved in salty water and mainly used on salads or as a filling for sandwiches.
Labneh			Similar to Greek yogurt, labneh is a strained yogurt product that is common in the Middle East and the Levant. Pictured is Labneh in olive oil.
Kashkawal			A type of yellow cheese made of sheep milk. In Israel it is often mixed with white brined cheese in a salty pastry and to make a toast.
Qishta			is a heavy cream that is very popular in the Middle East. Traditionally, it is made by skimming the thickest part of the cream from whey. The product is used both as an ingredient in cooking and is mixed with honey to be eaten as an incredibly rich dessert. Rich Cow brand Kashta is a fresh, rich-tasting, cream product texture of which is smooth and thick. It has a sixty-day refrigerated shelf life.
Halloumi			Unlike its Cypriot variation, in Israel, Halloumi cheese is usually eaten for breakfast as a meze dish fried in olive oil as well as being part of a main course omelette dish called habitath halloumi which includes an omelette, halloumi and herbs.
Hemed			The color is white and it has a smooth texture and a mild salty taste. It is commonly used as a table cheese eaten by itself or paired with fruit, used in pastries as well.
Kedem		Bitzaron	A creamy type of cheese, almost like Sour Cream. made of Water Buffalo's milk and used either in pastries or as a spread eaten with bread and olive oil.
Knaaan		Upper Galilee	A cheese that is not too sour, therefore it can be either salted or sweetened, used in pastries and desserts.
Hermon		Upper Galilee and Golan	A cheese that has a similar texture to that of the Knaan cheese, yet is saltier.
Khalla			A mild, and not salty type of a cheese, its name is derived from its appearance which looks like braided bread (challa).
Arrabah		Neot Smadar	A cheese that has originated in the southernmost part of Israel. It has a relatively mild flavour and not too salty, can be used in pastries and salads.
Kafrit			Also known as rural cheese, one of the most basic Cheeses in Israel, it has a texture relatively similar to that of a Feta cheese but generally less salty.

=== Levant ===
Name	Image	Region	Description
Akkawi		Acre	A white brine cheese. It is named after the city of Acre, where it first originated, and is commonly made using cow milk, but can also be made with goat or sheep's milk. It is widely used in Knafeh but Nabulsi cheese is used more often.
Areesh		Originated in Egypt	It is similar to cottage cheese. Shanklish, a fermented cheese, is made from areesh cheese.
Baladi cheese			Soft-white, smooth, creamy cheese has a mild flavor. It is eaten for breakfast or snacks. Pictured is spinach topped with Baladi.
Basket cheese		originated in Turkey	Made from cow's milk, it is available fresh or dry. Fresh basket has no salt taste, while dry basket is mildly salty. Basket cheese gets its name from the way it is formed (inside a basket).
Charkassiye			A soft cheese
Jameed		Jordan	Hard, dry laban made from goat or ewe's milk. Milk is kept in a fine woven cheesecloth to make a thick yogurt. Salt is added daily to thicken the yogurt even more and the outside of the yogurt filled cheesecloth is rinsed with water to allow any remaining whey to seep through. After a few days of salting the yogurt, it becomes very dense and it can be removed from the cheesecloth and shaped into round balls. Pictured is white Jameed in a shop front in Jerusalem.
Jibneh Arabieh		Arabian Peninsula	A traditional cheese in Middle East countries. It is particularly popular in the Arab States of the Persian Gulf. The cheese has an open texture and a mild taste similar to Feta but less salty.
Jibne Baida			Arabic for white cheese, is a white hard cheese with a pronounced salty taste, often boiled before eating.
Kashkawan			A type of yellow cheese made of sheep milk. In Albania, Bulgaria, North Macedonia, Serbia and Romania, the term is often used to refer to all yellow cheeses (or even any cheese other than sirene).
Qishta			is a heavy cream that is very popular in the Middle East. Traditionally, it is made by skimming the thickest part of the cream from whey. The product is used both as an ingredient in cooking and is mixed with honey to be eaten as an incredibly rich dessert. Rich Cow brand Kashta is a fresh, rich-tasting, cream product texture of which is smooth and thick. It has a sixty-day refrigerated shelf life.
Labneh			Similar to Greek yogurt, labneh is a strained yogurt product that is common in the Middle East and the Levant. Pictured is Labneh in olive oil.
Majdoule			A salty white cheese made up of thick strands of cheese braided together (hence the name)
Nabulsi cheese		Nablus	One of a number of Palestinian white brined cheeses made in the Middle East. Its name denotes its place of origin, Nablus and it is well known throughout the West Bank and surrounding regions. It is also a major ingredient of the Arabian desserts Knafeh and Qatayef.
Shelal			A salty white cheese made up of strands of cheese woven together.
Surke or Shanklish			A mature cheese made with spices and generally presented as balls of cheese covered in za'tar orchile powder; most often eaten as a starter dish with tomato, oil and sometimes onion.
Syrian cheese		Syria	There are different kinds of Syrian cheese. A few of the most common include Baladi and Charkassiye.

The Levant is a geographical region east of the Mediterranean Sea which includes the countries of Syria, Lebanon, Israel, Jordan, Palestine and sometimes it includes Cyprus and the Turkish province of Hatay

=== Turkey ===
Name	Image	Region	Description
Abaza			
Antep peyniri		Gaziantep	
Armola peyniri		Seferihisar	
Arnavut			
Beyaz peynir			A salty, white cheese made from unpasteurized sheep milk. The cheese has a slightly grainy appearance and is similar to Greek feta cheese.
Çamur		İzmir	
Çeçil (tr)		Erzurum	Also known as Civil Peyniri
Çökelek			
Çömlek Peyniri		Kayseri, Yozgat, Sivas	Also known as Küp peyniri
Dil Peyniri			
Edirne			
Ezine peyniri		Çanakkale	
Füme çerkes peyniri			
Hellim		Kuzey Kıbrıs	
Kars Gravyeri		Kars	
Kaşar			
Keçi Peyniri			A goat's milk cheese
Kirli Hanım		Ayvalık	
Kopanisti peyniri		İzmir	
Küflü Peynir		Konya, Ardahan	
Lor (tr)			
Malakan Peyniri		Kars	
Mihaliç Peyniri		Balıkesir	Also known as Kelle Peyniri or Manyas Peyniri
Obruk		Karaman	
Örgü		Diyarbakır	
Salamura		Bingöl, Tokat	
Sayas		İzmir	
Süzme Yoğurt			
Telli peynir		Karadeniz	
Tulum		Erzincan, İzmir, Tunceli, Aydın	
Van otlu peyniri		Van	

=== Yemen ===
Name	Image	Region	Description
Yemeni cheese		Taiz	A local sheep-milk, smoked-cheese, handmade in the city of Taiz

== North and Central America ==
=== Canada ===
Name	Image	Region	Description
Allegretto cheese		Made in Abitibi, Quebec.	A semi-soft, washed rind sheep's milk cheese.
Bleu Bénédictin		Made by the monks at the Benedictine Abbey of Saint-Benoît-du-Lac, Quebec	A semi-soft, whole milk blue cheese deeply veined with the Roquefort penicillium mold
Cheddar cheese			Most Canadian Cheddar is produced by a number of large companies in Ontario, though other provinces produce some and some smaller artisanal producers exist. The annual production is 120,000 tons. It is aged a minimum of three months, but much of it is held for much longer, up to 10 years.
Cheese curds			Cheese curds are a key ingredient in poutine.
Oka		Originally manufactured by the Trappist monks, who are located in Oka, Quebec, Canada	A semi-soft washed rind cheese, Oka has a distinct flavour and aroma, and is still manufactured in Oka, although now by a commercial company.
Pikauba		Saguenay–Lac-Saint-Jean, Quebec	A semi-firm cow's milk cheese, farmer made by hand, that is recognized by its fine orange rind and its soft, golden paste, strewn with small holes.

=== Costa Rica ===
Name	Image	Region	Description
Palmito cheese			A popular fresh cheese from Costa Rica that resembles a knotted ball of string cheese
Turrialba cheese		Turrialba, Cartago Province	A salty young cheese made of cow's milk

=== El Salvador ===
Name	Image	Region	Description
Cuajada			
Crema			A spreadable, unripened white cheese.
Enredo			
Queto			

=== Honduras ===
Name	Image	Region	Description
Crema			A spreadable, unripened white cheese.
Cuajada			
Quesillo			
Queijo seco			

=== Mexico ===
Name	Image	Region	Description
Adobera cheese		From western Mexico, most popular in Jalisco.	Its name is taken from the similarity of its shape to adobe bricks. It is mild and slightly salty to taste. Young Adobera has a soft texture and can be crumbled or cubed. As the cheese matures, its texture becomes more creamy and it can no longer be crumbled. It melts well.
Añejo cheese			A firm, aged Mexican cheese traditionally made from skimmed goat's milk but most often available made from skimmed cow's milk. After it is made it is rolled in paprika to add additional flavor to its salty sharp flavor.
Asadero cheese		First made in Chihuahua and later Durango. Immigrants brought Asadero cheese making to the southwestern United States.	Asadero cheese is a soft cheese that melts easily. It is usually made in the shape of a round tortilla. Often mistaken for Oaxaca cheese.
Chiapas cheese			A dry cream cheese with a crumbly texture that is formed into balls and often has string cheese wrapped around it.
Chihuahua cheese		From the state of Chihuahua.	A soft white cheese available in braids, balls or rounds. Also known as queso menonita, after the Mennonite communities of northern Mexico that first produced it. Tastes similar to a mild white Cheddar or Monterey Jack and melts well.
Cotija cheese		Named for the city Cotija in the state of Michoacán.	Made from cow's milk, young Cotija is similar to Feta, while aged Cotija is more like Parmesan. It does not melt when heated.
Criollo cheese		A specialty of the region around Taxco, Guerrero.	A grateable Mexican cheese similar to American-style Munster cheese
Lingallin			
Oaxaca cheese		Named after the state of Oaxaca in southern Mexico, where it was first made	A white, semihard stretched curd cheese from Mexico, similar to unaged Monterey Jack, but with a stringy Mozzarella-like texture.
Queso Crema			
Queso de cuajo			
Queso Fresco			
Queso Panela			A white, fresh and smooth Mexican cheese of pasteurized cow's milk
Requesón			A Mexican version of Ricotta that is used in salads, soups, cooked foods, dips and desserts. It is very mild and has a semi-sweet flavor. Itsb texture is soft, moist and slightly grainy.

=== Nicaragua ===
Name	Image	Region	Description
Quesillo			

=== United States ===
Name	Image	Region	Description
Bergenost		New York	Brand name of a semi-soft cheese with a mild, smooth flavor and a subtle hint of sourness. Bergenost is a triple-cream, Norwegian-style butter cheese made by Yancey's Fancy of Corfu, New York using imported Norwegian cultures.
Brick cheese		Wisconsin	Prepared in brick-shaped form, the color ranges from pale yellow to white, and it has a sweet and mild flavor when young, and matures into a strong ripe cheese with age. It is medium-soft, crumbles easily and is somewhat sticky to the knife.
Cheese curds		Upper Midwest	Best eaten within 24–48 hours of production and at room temperature. Fresh curds will often come in a bag and have a little whey in the bag. They are often high in moisture and salty and will likely squeak while you chew them. After a couple days or after any refrigeration they can be "regenerated" with a couple seconds in a microwave, but they will not be the same or as fresh. They are good in an omelete or breaded and fried at this point. After a few days they will be like a young colby or cheddar.
Colby cheese		Wisconsin	Kin to cheddar, but much milder. The curd is washed at production to rinse off the lactose (milk sugars). Bacteria do not have a chance to make the cheese more acidic as it ages, unlike cheddar. It melts well.
Colby-Jack cheese		Wisconsin	A marbled cheese composed of Colby and Monterey Jack that originates from the city of Colby, Wisconsin. It is often used in meat and cheese trays.
Colorado Blackie		Colorado	A cheese from the American West named for its black waxed rind.
Cream cheese			
Creole cream cheese		New Orleans, Louisiana	
Cup Cheese			
Farmer cheese		Wisconsin	
Hoop cheese			A cheese made only using milk
Humboldt Fog		California	A mold-ripened cheese with a central line of edible white ash much like Morbier
Liederkranz cheese		New York	
Monterey Jack		California	An American white, semi-hard cheese made using cow's milk. It is noted for its mild flavor and slight sweetness.
Muenster cheese			Mild, semi-soft cow's milk cheese with a creamy texture and distinctive orange rind. Excellent for melting in sandwiches and burgers, and pairs well with light beers and fruits. A milder counterpart to the stronger French Munster.
Nacho cheese		Texas	A generic name used to refer to a variety of processed cheese sauces flavored with peppers and spices, typically poured on top of nachos or served on their own as a dip for a variety of foods. Nacho cheese is also referred to as simply "queso."
Pepper jack cheese			A variety of Monterey Jack.
Pinconning cheese		Michigan	An aged variety of Colby
Provel cheese			A white, processed cheese made of a blend of Cheddar, Swiss, and Provolone cheeses. Particularly popular in and around St Louis, MO.
Red Hawk		Northern California	A soft, mildly salty cheese
String cheese			The particular American variety of Mozzarella with a stringy texture.
Teleme cheese			
Cottage cheese			It is a fresh cheese curd product with a mild flavor and soupy texture. It is drained, but not pressed, so some whey remains and the individual curds remain loose.

== Oceania ==
=== Australia ===
Name	Image	Region	Description
Tasty cheese			The name-equivalent of cheddar cheese used in Australia and New Zealand, especially manufacturers and sellers.

== South America ==
=== Argentina ===
Name	Image	Region	Description
Cremoso cheese			A fresh cheese elaborated with cow's milk, with or without the addition of cream. It has its origin in Argentina, and derives from Italian cheeses with similar characteristics as Crescenza.
Criollo			
Goya	Queso Goya		
Reggianito			Pictured are rounds of Argentine Reggianito cheese, accompanied with bread.
Sardo			
Chubut			
Tandil			
Mar del Plata			
Tafí del Valle			
Cuartirolo			
Provoleta			
Queso de Maquina			

=== Bolivia ===
Name	Image	Region	Description
Chaqueño			
Menonita			

=== Brazil ===
Name	Image	Region	Description
Catupiry			A soft, mild-tasting cheese that can be spread over toasts, crackers and bread buns or used in cooking. Because of its low level of acidity, catupiry has become an ingredient in various dishes. It is one of the most popular "requeijão" (creamy cheese) brands in Brazil.
Minas			Comes in four varieties, named queijos-de-minas frescal (fresh), meia-cura (half-aged) and curado (aged). A fourth variety, branded queijo padrão ("standard" cheese) has been developed more recently and can be found in nearly all supermarkets and grocery stores in Brazil.
Queijo coalho			A firm but very lightweight cheese produced in Northeastern Brazil
Queijo de Colônia			or Colony cheese.
Queijo Meia Cura			
Queijo Canastra			Made from raw cow's milk and has a mildly spicy, full bodied flavor
Queijo Cobocó			
Queijo-do-Reino			A Brazilian semi-hard cheese, similar to the Dutch Edam cheese
Queijo do Serro			
Queijo Manteiga			
Queijo prato			A Brazilian soft cheese, similar to the Danish cheese danbo
Requeijão			In Brazil, Requeijão is a type of cream cheese white in color (but not similar to the American notion of cream cheese, and may be better understood as "creamy cheese"). It has a mild taste and its consistency can vary from creamy solid to liquid.

=== Chile ===
Name	Image	Region	Description
Chanco cheese			Cow's milk cheese originally from the Chanco farm in Maule Region. Now it is produced all over south-central Chile, and represents almost 50% of Chilean cheese consumption.
Panquehue		Andean Aconcagua region	A semi-soft cheese, it is one of the most popular cheeses in Chile, it is similar in taste to Tilsit and often has chives or red pepper flakes mixed in.
Renaico			

=== Colombia ===
Name	Image	Region	Description
Queso Campesino		Antioquia, Cundinamarca, Boyaca .	is called Quesito too, fresh made on big wheels traditionally
Queso costeño		Caribbean	A kind of Queso Campesino with a high content of salt in order to be kept longer fresh under salt water
Cuajada		Department of Cundinamarca and Boyacá, oriental mountains	is a kind of fresh done cheese with only one or few days of mature. Is the same kind as Quesillo. Comparable to Mozzarella is kept fresh in Banana leaves where it gets actually its typical form and texture
Queso Paipa		Paipa is a city in Boyacá Department, with a high production of Holstein Milk.	Made since colonial times, it is a semi-hard, semi-fat and semi-cured cheese.
Queso Pera			A kind of mature Mozzarella specifically in a pressed form of a pear forms layers which give the special favorite taste. An industrial variation is filled with very sweet guave/guayaba marmalade
Quesillo			In Colombia, quesillo is a type of double cream cheese wrapped within a plantain leaf, made originally in the Tolima Department; the town of Guamo is most known for this dairy product.
Queso 7 cueros		From the Meta Department and the eastern plains	similar to the Pera cheese. The cheese is made with rich in fat milk. In the process it is heated and stretched in a technique called "pasta hilada" creating threads that make layers called "cueros" which give the siete cueros cheese its characteristical texture.

=== Paraguay ===
Name	Image	Region	Description
Paraguay		Paraguay	Made with whole cow's milk, without skimming. Creamy cheese, soft mass and slightly sour flavor.

=== Peru ===
Name	Image	Region	Description
Allpachaca		Ayacucho	Different regional varieties, similar to Andean cheese (Queso Andino).
Queso Andino		Cajamarca	Smooth texture and mild flavor.
Queso fresco			Regional version of the traditional fresh cheese, soft and white in color.

=== Uruguay ===
Name	Image	Region	Description
Colonia		Colonia	It is a soft cheese with a hard rind, light yellow color and abundant eyes.
Cuartirolo			Ripened, high moisture and fatty cheese. Soft, creamy, somewhat elastic consistency. Smooth, closed and uniform texture. Uniform yellowish-white colour. Slightly acid taste. Mild smell. Made from pasteurized milk.
Danbo			It is a washed curd, ripened cheese, from standardised and pasteurized milk. A variation of Danish danbo cheese. It is a matured cheese, of medium moisture and fat. Semi-hard, elastic consistency. Compact, smooth, not grainy texture. Uniform yellowish white colour. Lactic, smooth, slightly salty, characteristic flavor. This cheese comes in blocks which are salted, and surface dried. vacuum packaged and stored for ripening.
Sándwich			Processed mold cheese, specially made for the production of Sandwiches de miga (crust free).
Termal		Colonia Juan Gutiérrez, Paysandú	It is made using the salty waters of the Almirón Hot Springs. Made with whole cow's milk. Presentation: cylindrical in shape, approximately 1 kg, 10 cm in diameter, and 8 cm high, smooth and clean surface. Color: slightly light yellow.
Yamandú			It was a type of Gouda cheese, with a firm, semi-hard paste, made with unpasteurized milk and with the addition of selected ferments. It ceased to be produced in 1980 due to changes in the sanitary requirement for pasteurization.
Zapicán			Made with cow's milk, from 3 to 4 kg in weight. It has a firm consistency and texture, with some spherical eyes and a smooth but defined flavor. Used as cut cheese.

=== Venezuela ===
Name	Image	Region	Description
Guayanés cheese		Guayana Region	A soft, salty, white cheese.
Queso crineja			
Queso de mano			A type of soft, white cheese (queso fresco) most commonly associated with Venezuelan cuisine. Pictured is a cachapa with queso de mano.
Queso Llanero			Also known as prairie cheese and queso de año.
Queso Palmita			A soft, watery, fresh white cheese with big holes, produced from pasteurized milk. It is usually made in large circular containers 6 feet in diameter and four feet in height.
Queso Parma de Barinitas	Queso semiduro		
Queso telita			A mild farmer's cheese that is packaged in liquid.

== Other ==
Some types of cheese were either developed in various locales independently (usually as un-aged products from the beginning stages of dairy processing and cheesemaking), or are not actually cheese products. Examples include:

Name	Image	Region	Description
Farmer cheese		Various	Varieties of which are made in most cultures with a strong dairy culture.
Port wine cheese			An orange- and red-colored cheese that prepared with alcoholic port wine as it is made
Smoked cheese		Various	A style of preparing any number of hard or semi-hard cheeses, using smoke or smoke flavoring. Pictured is smoked Gruyère cheese.
Soy cheese			Not a dairy product, but a cheese analogue made from soybeans/soy protein. Pictured is soy cheese manufactured to the consistency of a cream cheese.
Rice cheese			As with soy cheese, an analogue from rice/rice protein

== Unsorted ==
- Tresse cheese
- Morcella

== See also ==
- Category: Cheeses by country
- Brined cheese – Cheese that is matured in brine
- Butter cheese
- Dairy product – Food made from milk
- List of blue cheeses
- List of cheese dishes
- List of cheesemakers
- List of dairy products
- List of goat milk cheeses
- List of smoked foods
- List of stretch-curd cheeses
- Sheep milk cheese – Cheese produced with ewe's milk
  - List of sheep milk cheeses
- List of water buffalo cheeses

=== Articles by country ===
- Cheeses of Mexico – Overview of Mexican cheeses
- List of American cheeses
- List of Armenian cheeses
- List of British cheeses
- List of Cornish cheeses
- List of Dutch cheeses
- List of English cheeses
- List of French cheeses
- List of German cheeses
- List of Irish cheeses
- List of Italian cheeses
- List of Polish cheeses
- List of Spanish cheeses
- List of Swiss cheeses

=== Protected cheeses ===
- List of European cheeses with protected geographical status
- List of French Protected Designations of Origin cheeses
- List of Greek Protected Designations of Origin cheeses
- List of Italian DOP cheeses
- List of Portuguese cheeses with protected status
