= Tybo =

Tybo may refer to:

== Places in Nevada, United States ==
- Tybo, Nevada, an unincorporated community
- Tybo Charcoal Kilns, a pair of charcoal kilns in Nye County
- Tybo Shale, a geologic formation

== Other uses ==
- Tybo cheese, a Danish cow's milk cheese
- Chloronycta tybo, a species of moth
