= Allegretto (disambiguation) =

Allegretto is a music tempo.

Allegretto may also refer to:

- Allegretto cheese
- Allegretto (horse)
- Allegretto Nuzi or Allegretto di Nuzio (1315–1373), Italian painter
