= Papanași =

Romanian and Moldovan traditional fried or boiled dessert

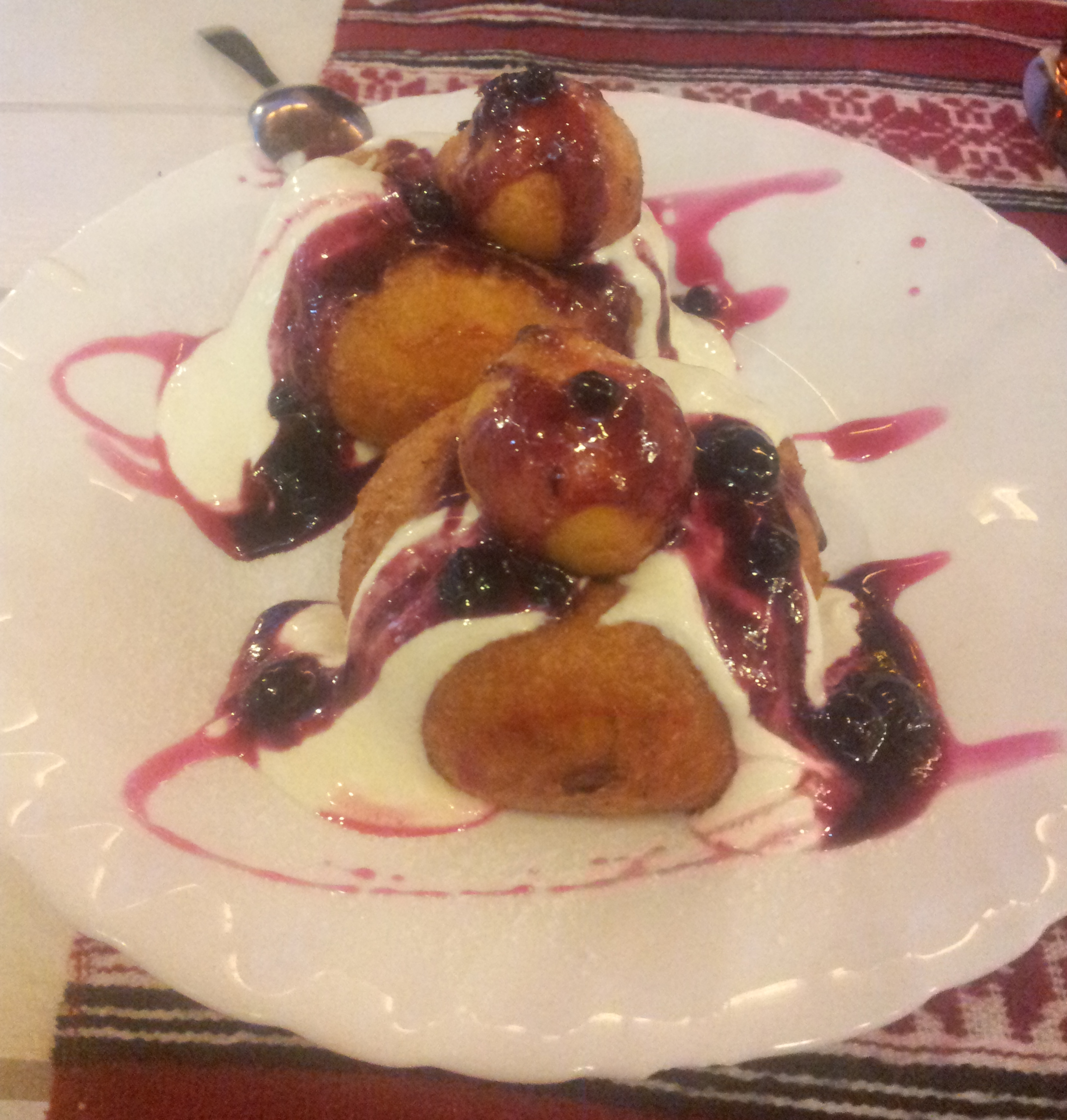
- Papanași, with cherries, at a restaurant, in Sinaia
- Type: Dessert
- Course: Main, Dessert
- Place of origin: Romania, Moldova
- Main ingredients: soft cheese (ca. 60-70%), wheat flour (ca. 30%), sugar; cream and jam for topping

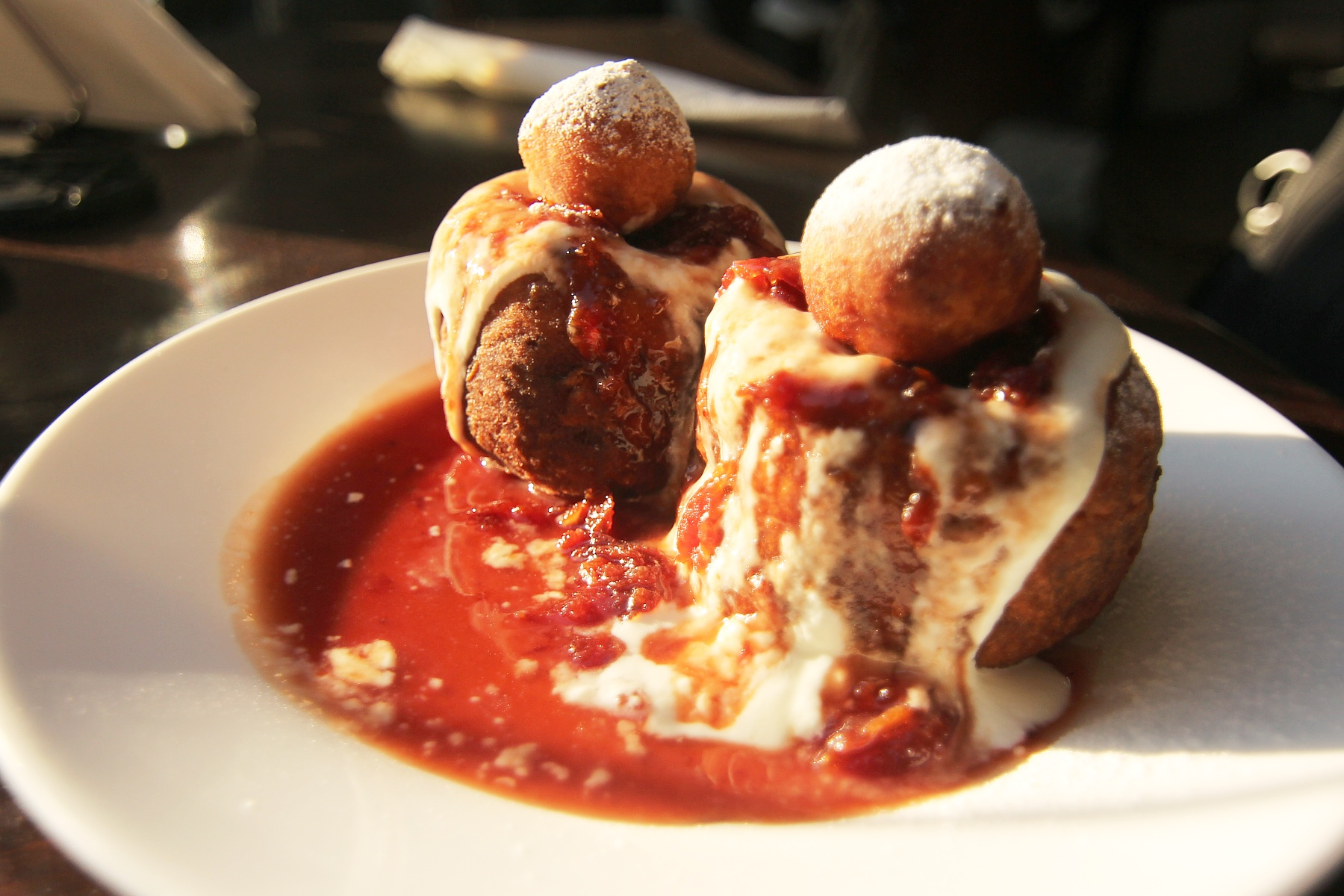
Papanași with sour cherries and powdered sugar

Papanași is a Romanian dessert made from fresh-cheese (brânza proaspătă or urdă) dough. It is usually served topped with cream (smântână) and fruit confit. It is a traditional dessert in Romania and Moldova.

== Preparation ==
Papanași is doughnut-shaped with the doughnut hole on top. The dough is made with a soft cheese such as urdă, substitutes include ricotta and cottage cheese. Papanași are served covered in crème fraîche or heavy cream or sour cream, and topped with sour cherries or jam or preserves.

Papanași dough can be fried, as a "doughnut", or boiled, as a dumpling, like large gnocchi.

Ingredients: semolina or wheat flour, urdă or ricotta or cottage cheese, rum or lemon zest or orange zest, preserves or cherries, sour cream or crème fraîche, vanilla, eggs, sugar, salt, butter, baking soda.

== Etymology ==
The word papanași may come from the Latin papa or pappa, which means 'food for children'.

In Hungarian Papanași is called Túrófánk Kalaposan (translates to "Túrófánk à la hat"). Normal túrófánk is popular in the Romanian region of Transylvania.
