= Pikauba =

Pikauba may refer to:

- Lac-Pikauba, Quebec, unorganized territory in Quebec, Canada
- Pikauba Lake, body of water in Lac-Pikauba
- Pikauba River, Quebec, Canada
  - Petite rivière Pikauba, tributary of Pikauba River
- Pikauba (cheese), a semi-firm farmer cheese made in Quebec, Canada
