= Queso de mano =

Venezuelan soft, white cheese

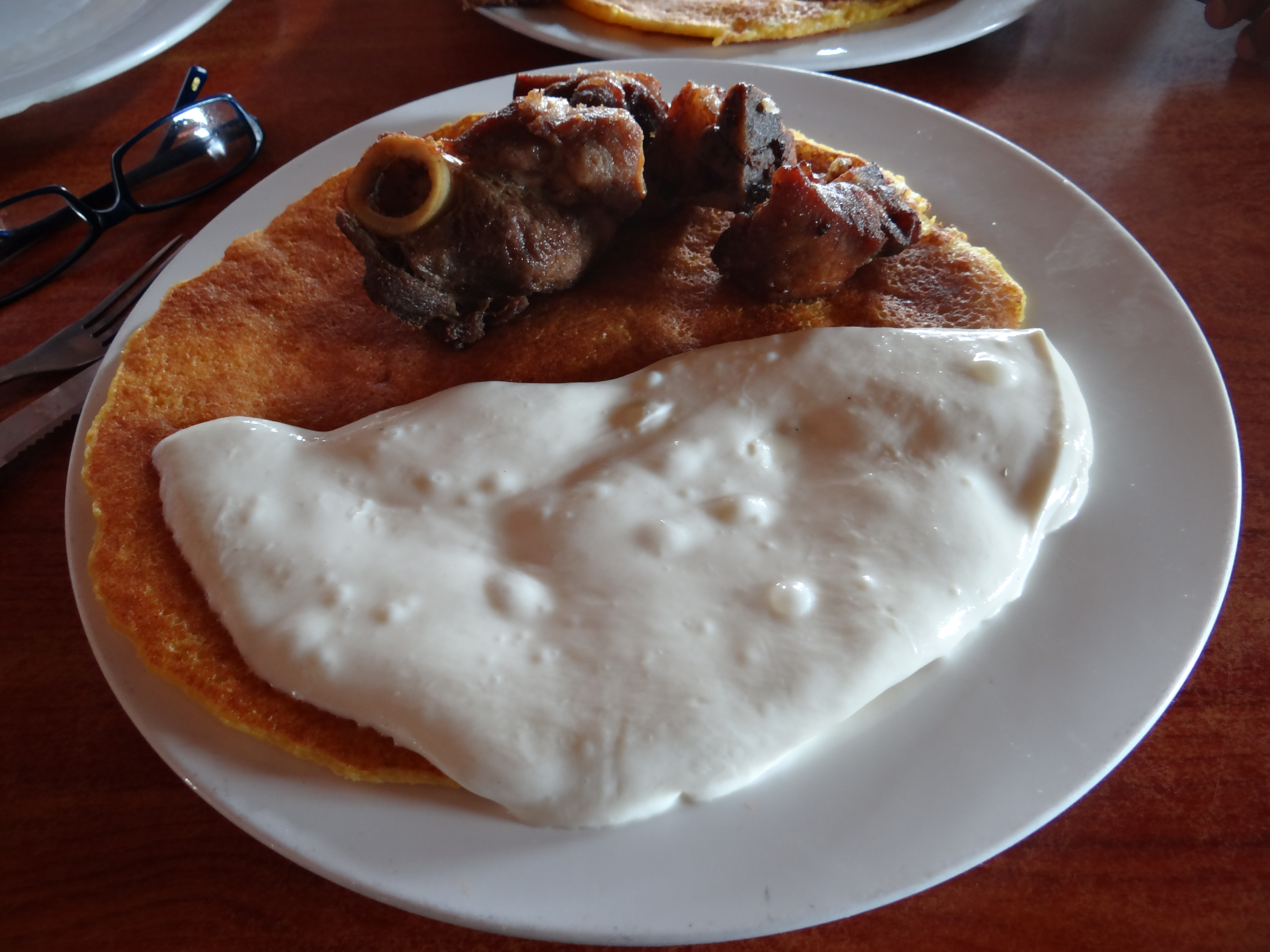
A cachapa with queso de mano

Queso de mano ("handmade cheese") is a type of soft, fresh white cheese (queso fresco) most commonly associated with Venezuelan cuisine. It is most often used as a filling for arepas and cachapa. The taste and consistency of the cheese most closely resembles that of fresh mozzarella (which is also a fresh, white, wet cheese), but is built up in layers. (Note that this is not similar to American/Canadian mozzarella, which is a low-moisture, firm, dry, rubbery and salty cheese, usually sold in blocks.)

== Preparation ==
Queso de mano is prepared using a combination of cow's milk and ewe's milk curd. The resulting product is called cuajada. Once this step is attained, the cuajada is mixed with hot water to ensure the elasticity of the cheese. The mixture is then cooled in special molds which give the resulting cheese a roughly spherical appearance.

== Variants ==
A local version of the cheese, called guayanés cheese is popular in the state of Bolivar.

== See also ==
- List of cheeses
