= Le Gré des Champs =

Organic Raw Cheese

Le Gré des champs is an organic raw-cheese from the Montérégie region, in Quebec, Canada. This firm cheese with a nutty flavour contains 35% fat.

More information

- Type: firm paste, tastes of nuts.
- Manufacturer: Fromagerie Au Gré des Champs
- Fat content: 35%
- HMoisture content: 44%

== See also ==
- List of cheeses
