= Flower of Rajya =

Nepalese cheese

Flower of Rajya is a firm yak's-milk cheese made in Nepal by Tibetan nomads in collaboration with the Trace Foundation. Milk is heated and ripened in big copper vats, curdled, drained and molded into 10–12 lb (4.5–5.4 kg) wheels. The cheese is dry-cured in Tibetan red salt, aged, then wrapped in scarves and packed in bamboo baskets.

== See also ==
- List of cheeses
