= Raejuusto =

Finnish fresh cheese

Raejuusto (trans. "granular cheese" also known as grynost by the Swedish speaking Finns) is a Finnish fresh cheese that is rather similar to cottage cheese. In Sweden, raejuusto-type cheese is known as keso, and in Denmark as hytteost. Raejuusto is made from cow's milk.

Raejuusto has a low fat content, similar to cottage cheese and a high protein content. It can be enjoyed on its own or together with, for instance, cucumber, olive oil and ground black pepper. Raejuusto is also often used to garnish soups and other dishes.

== See also ==
- List of cheeses
