= Tybo cheese =

Danish cheese

Tybo
- Country of origin: Denmark
- Source of milk: cow
- Texture: semi-hard
- Fat content: 25-46%
- Named after: Thy

Tybo is a Danish cow's milk cheese, similar to a mild Samsø. It is loaf-shaped, with a cream-colored, an interior dotted with holes and a yellow rind. It has a slightly salty, smooth, and lactic flavor. Sometimes it is flavored with caraway seeds.

The production of Tybo was described in the Middle Ages. Fresh, warm, unskimmed milk was coagulated and stirred by hand or ladle until separation occurred and solid material began to settle. The solid material was then kneaded, squeezed, and layered; with salt sprinkled in between the layers.

== See also ==
- List of cheeses
