= Herrgårdsost =

Semi-hard Swedish cheese made from cow's milk

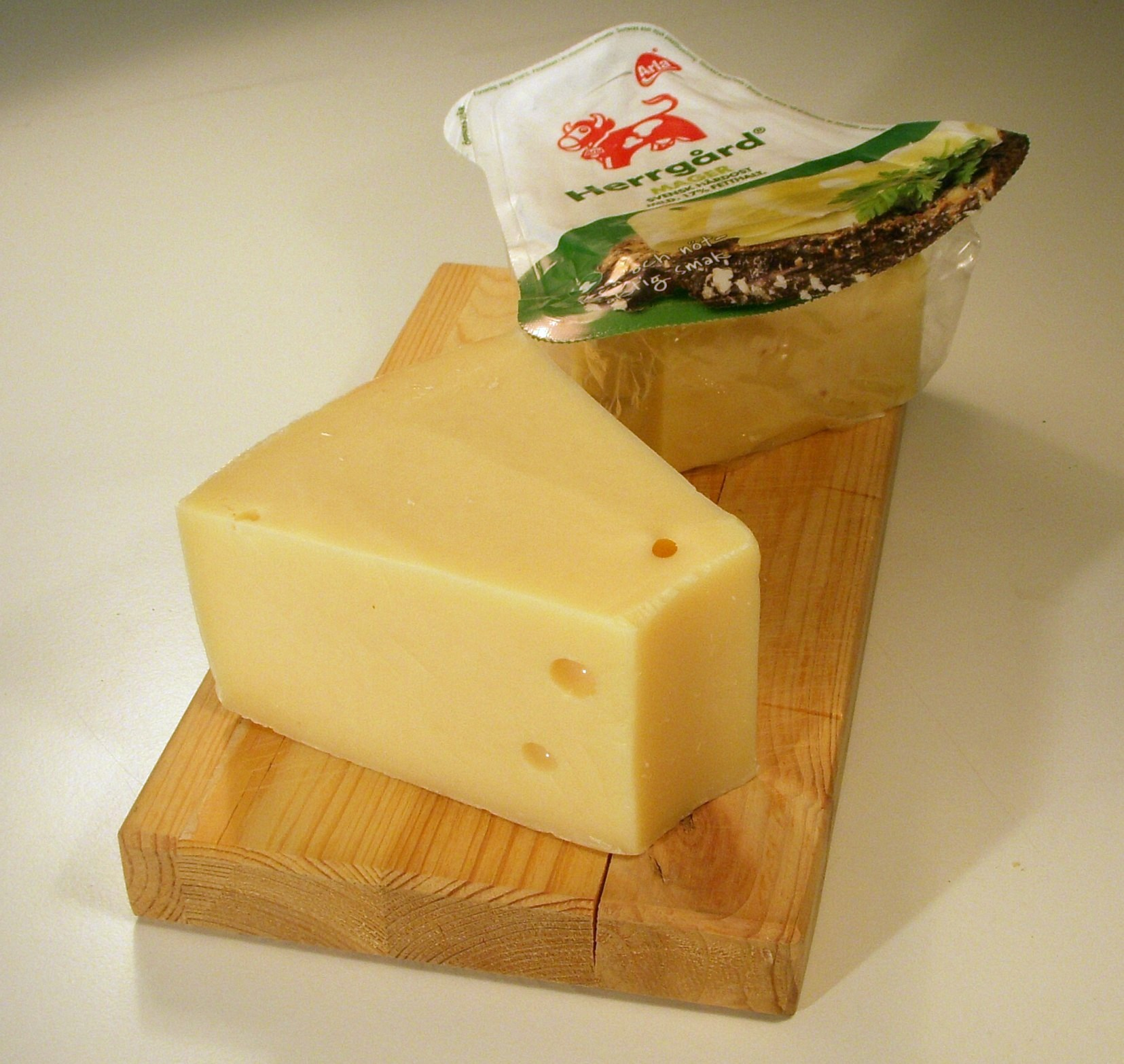
Swedish Herrgårdsost

Herrgårdsost (Manorhouse cheese) is a semi-hard Swedish cheese made from cow's milk. The aged cheese has a mild, nutty and creamy taste. The cheese has small round holes and a waxed surface. Herrgårdsost is usually manufactured in wheels about 40 cm (16 in) in diameter and 12 cm (4.7 in) wide, weighing around 14 kg (31 lb). Since 2004, the cheese has been marketed under the registered trademark Herrgård, owned by the company Svenska Ostklassiker AB, a subsidiary of Svensk Mjölk.

Herrgårdsost began to be manufactured at Swedish manor houses in the 19th century. Herrgårdsost usually starts as pasteurized part-skim milk. Bacterial starters are introduced including lactic acid bacteria, which acidify the milk, and propionic bacteria, which are responsible for producing the carbon dioxide that creates the holes. The soured milk is curdled with rennet and heated to no higher than 43 °C (109 °F). The whey is drained and the curd is pressed, forming a wheel, which is then salted in brine. The cheese wheels are later coated in wax. They are aged in this state usually for at least three or four months, but often up to one or two years.

== See also ==
- List of cheeses

== Other sources ==
Doane, C.F.; Hargrove, Robert C.; Lawson, H.W.; Matheson, K.J.; Sanders, G.P; Walter, Homer E. (1969). Cheese Varieties and Descriptions. U.S. Department of Agriculture. p. 58
