= Gotland Blue =

Swedish cheese

Gotland Blue (Swedish: Blå Gotland, German: Gotland Blau) was a cheese by the Arla Foods company in the town of Stånga on the island of Gotland in Sweden. This cheese is often characterized as being somewhere between strong and mild, containing elements of both types. The colour is a pale yellow, with no holes. It is similar to Emmentaler in texture, but has a flavour reminiscent of stronger cheeses. The cheese is cube shaped and covered in a blue wax, thus making the cheese take on visual cues from the Swedish flag and national colours. Blå Gotland was sold in Sweden and in Germany. The cheese is no longer made as the factory in Stånga shut down in 2004.

== See also ==
- List of cheeses#Sweden
