= Nazareth cheese =

Belgian cheese

Nazareth
- Country of origin: Belgium
- Region, town: Nazareth
- Region: Manufactured in West Flanders (originally from East Flanders)
- Source of milk: Cows
- Pasteurised: Yes
- Texture: Hard
- Fat content: 45%

Nazareth cheese, named after Nazareth, the village where it originated, is a Belgian hard cheese.

It is now manufactured by Belgomilk, which is part of the Milcobel group. The cheese, which can be identified by its dark brown rind, has a mildly subtle flavour. Quick restaurants have rapidly made a collaboration to serve some "kaas croketten" available in 5 or 13 pièces in every Quick in Belgium.

== See also ==
- List of cheeses
