= Lappi cheese =

Type of cheese

Lappi is a cheese made from partially skimmed cow's milk, very similar to Emmental except that it is pasteurized, and so is a little less flavorful, with smaller holes and a slightly firmer texture. It is so named because its recipe was developed in the Lapland region of Finland.

== See also ==
- List of cheeses
