= Lüneberg cheese =

Austrian cheese

Lüneberg is a cow's-milk cheese made in mountain valleys in Vorarlberg in western Austria. Cheesemaking was introduced into this region from Switzerland; copper kettles and Swiss-type presses are used to make Lüneberg cheese. Milk is coloured with saffron and warmed to around 90 °F (32 °C); enough rennet is added to coagulate in 20 to 30 minutes. The curd is cut into pieces the size of hazelnuts and is heated, while stirring, to 122 °F (50 °C). It is then placed into cloths which are pressed lightly in wooden forms. After 24 hours in the press, during which time the cheeses are turned and the cloths are occasionally changed, the cheeses are taken to a curing cellar. They are salted on the surface, and rubbed and washed occasionally while curing. When ripe, the cheese is said to be about midway in characteristics between Emmental and Limburger.

== See also ==
- List of cheeses
