= Russian cheese =

Russian semi-hard cheese

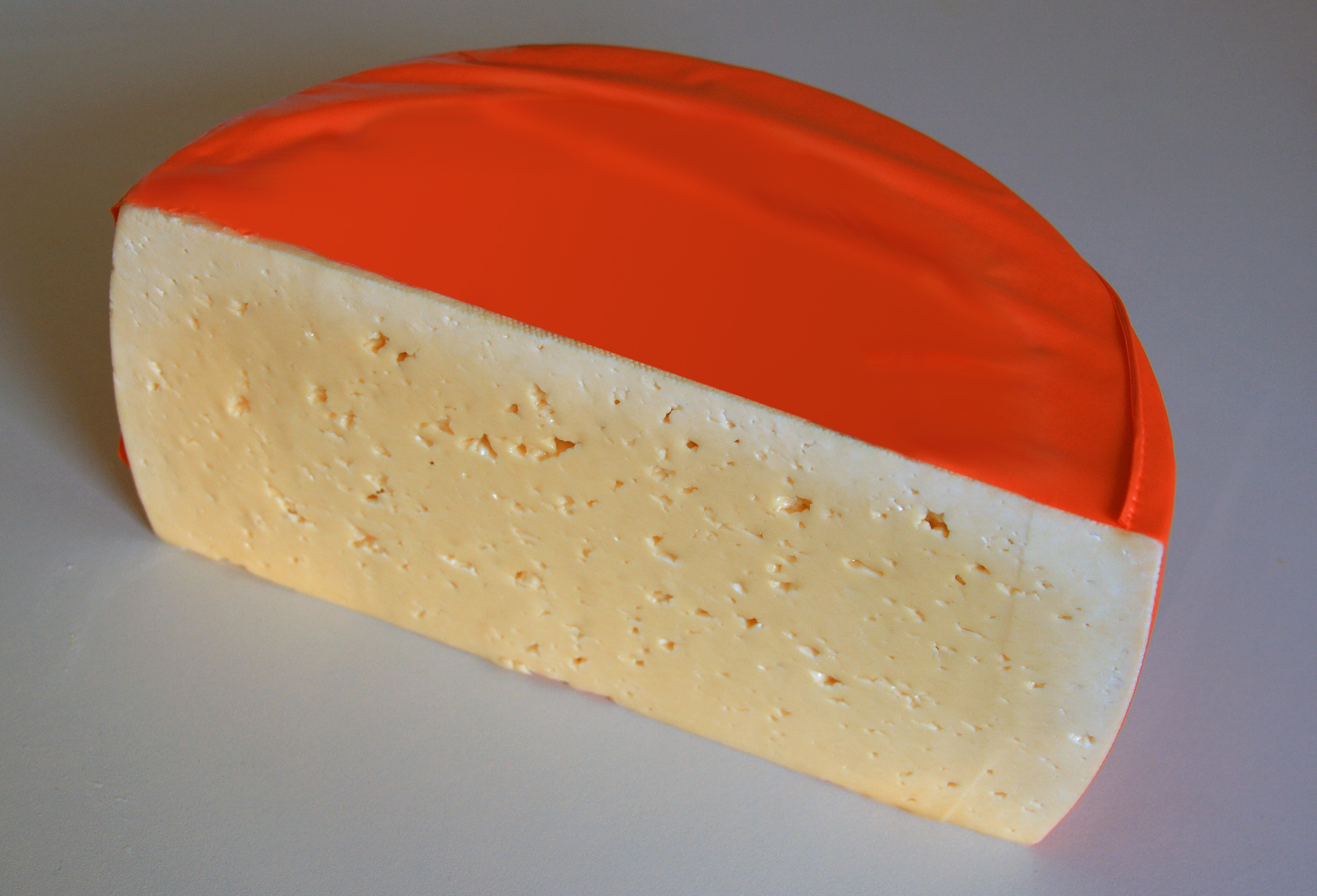
- Other names: Российский сыр
- Country of origin: Russian SFSR
- Source of milk: Cows
- Pasteurised: Yes
- Texture: Semi-hard
- Fat content: 50 ±1.6%
- Aging time: 2 months
- Certification: GOST R 52972-2008 (effective from 1 January 2010)

Russian cheese (Russian: Российский сыр, romanized: Rossiyskiy syr) is a Russian semi-hard, chymosin cheese produced from pasteurized cow's milk and aged for two months. The recipe was developed by VNIIMS in Uglich, Yaroslavl Oblast, Russian SFSR, in the 1960s.

There is a Сыр Российский (Syr Rossiysky) brand which does not have exclusivity rights, and a large number of factories in Russia and other post-Soviet states produce the cheese.

== Ingredients ==
It is produced from pasteurized milk with chymosin fermenter and a starter of mesophilic bacteria, as well as salt, calcium chloride (thickener), and the natural colorant annatto (if the cheese is produced in the winter). The cheese is semi-hard with a fat content of 50 ±1.6%, yellow, and small holes can be seen when cut. It tastes slightly sour.

== See also ==
- List of cheeses
