= Panquehue cheese =

Chilean cheese

Panquehue (Spanish pronunciation: [paŋˈkewe]) is a semi-soft Chilean cheese produced in the Andean Aconcagua region. It is one of the most popular cheeses in Chile, it is similar in taste to Tilsit and often has chives or red pepper flakes mixed in. In 2005, it became the first Chilean cheese imported into the United States as part of the free trade agreement.

== See also ==
- List of cheeses
