= Paipa cheese =

Cheese from Valley of Sogamoso in Colombia

Queso Paipa
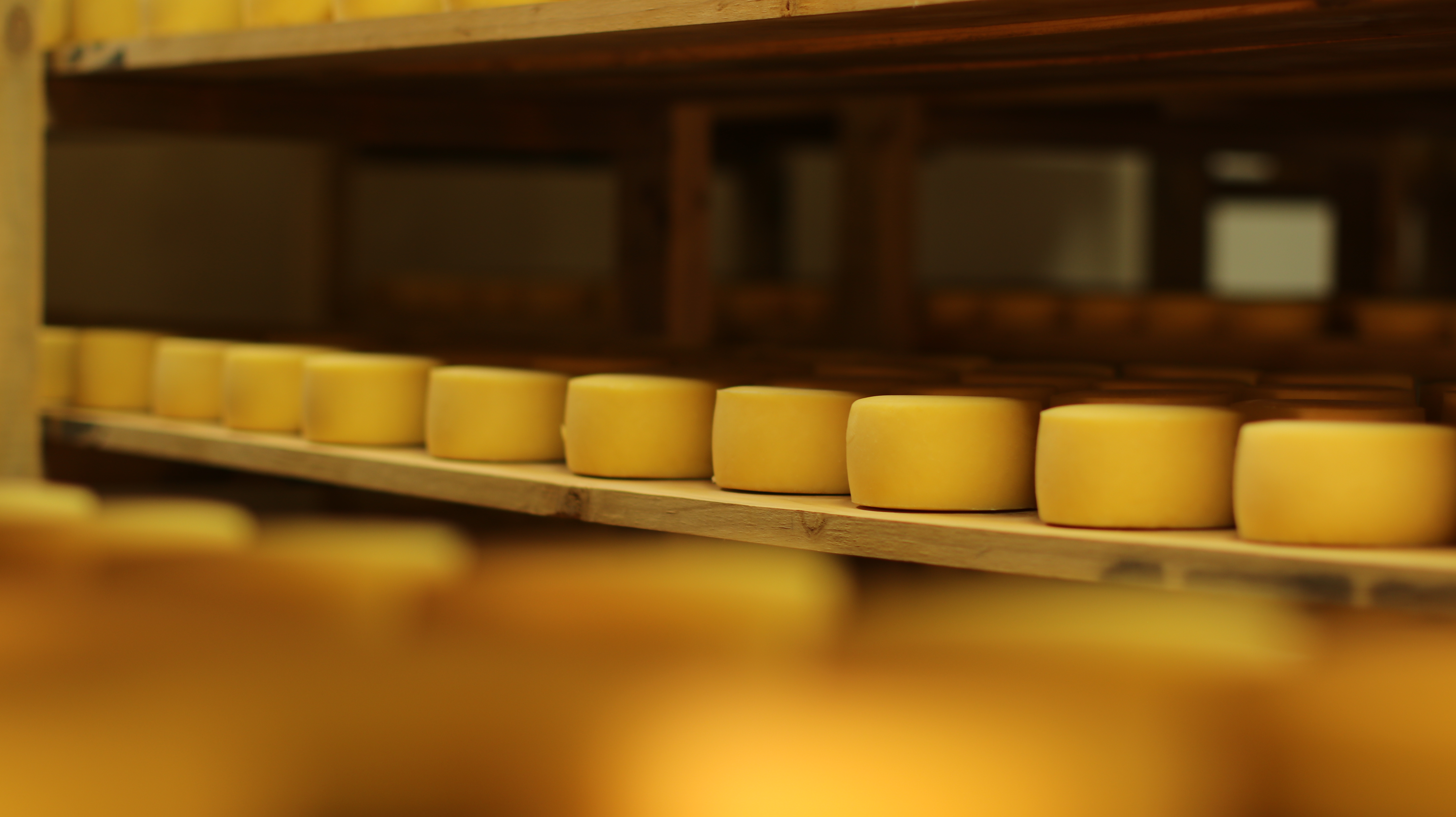
- Country of origin: Colombia
- Region: Boyacá
- Town: Sotaquirá & Paipa
- Source of milk: Cow
- Pasteurised: Traditionally, no
- Texture: Semi-hard
- Fat content: 41%
- Aging time: 3 weeks
- Certification: Protected Designation of Origin

Paipa cheese is a semi-hard, semi-fat, and semi-aged cheese produced solely in the Valley of Sogamoso, which includes the towns of Paipa and Sotaquirá (Boyacá Department), due to its protected designation of origin status granted by the Colombian government.

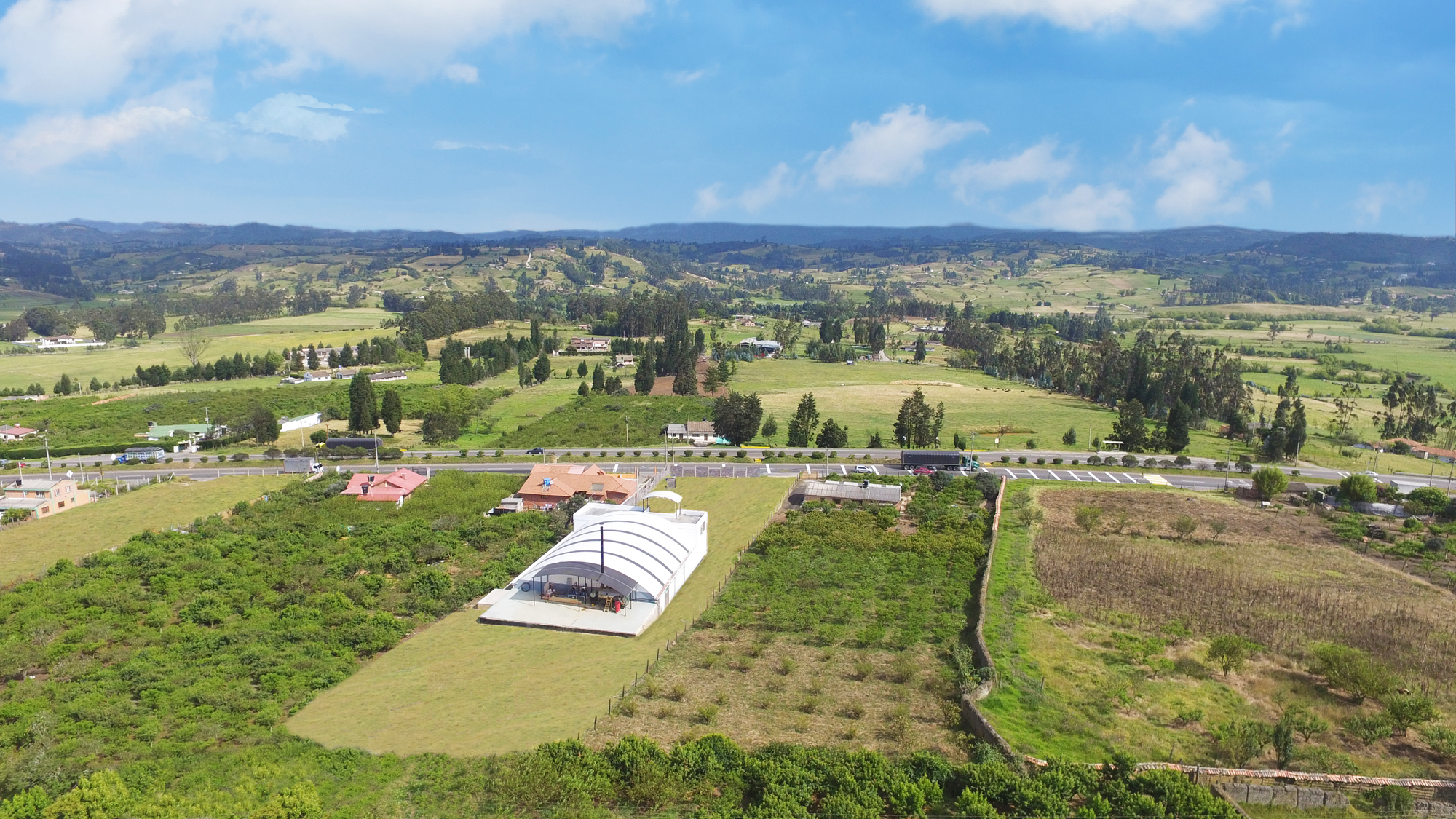
Paipa cheese plant in Sotaquirá.

== History ==
Paipa cheese is the reinvention of Reinoso cheese from the region and has been made for more than 100 years. Its history is related to haciendas in Boyacá.

Its name is due to the municipality of Paipa, where it was sold on market days to travelers and passers.

== See also ==
- List of cheeses
