= Samsø cheese =

Danish cheese

Samsø
- Country of origin: Denmark
- Source of milk: cow
- Pasteurised: yes
- Texture: semi-hard
- Fat content: 30–45%
- Aging time: 3-6 months

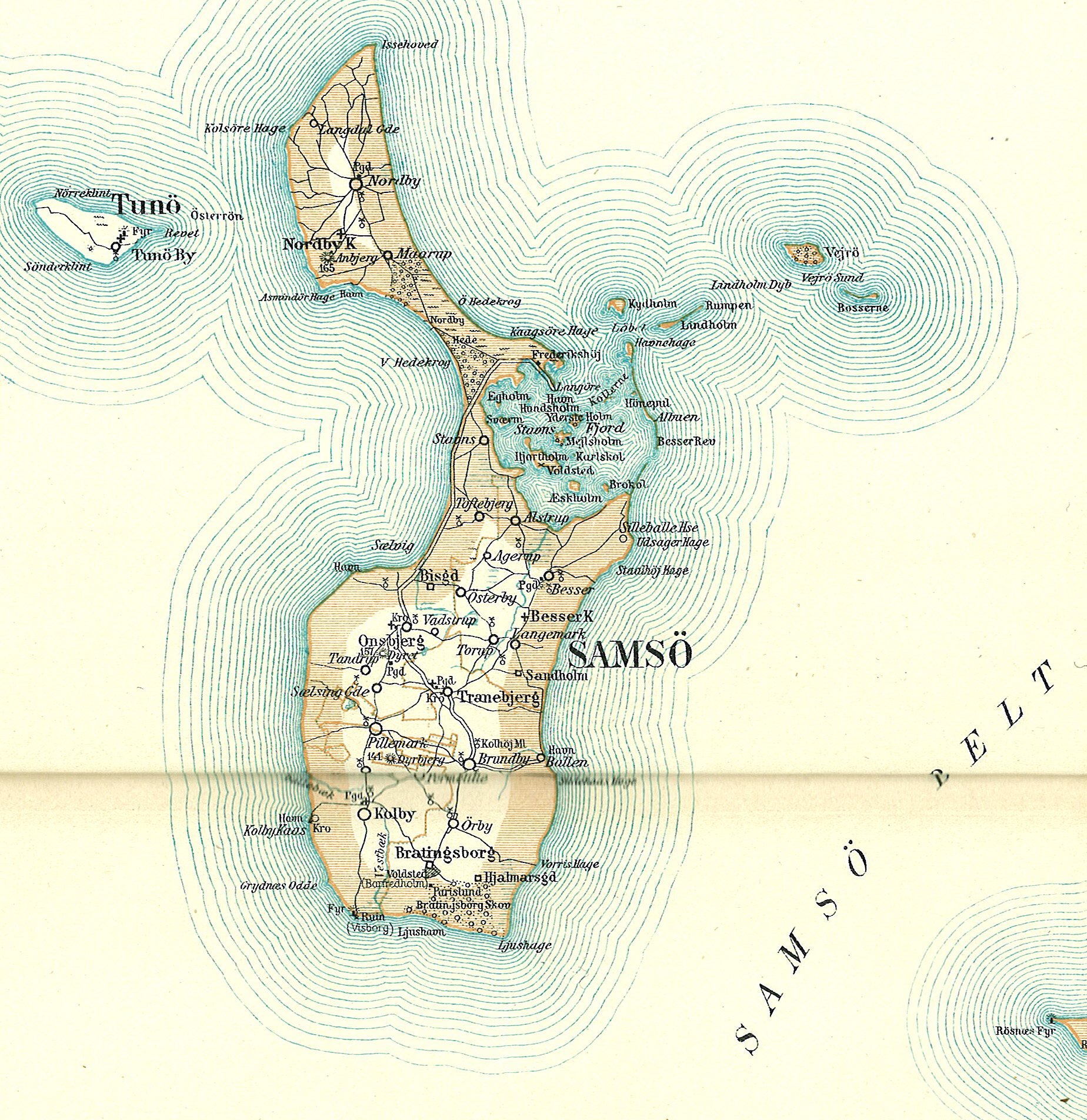
Map of Samsø in Denmark

Samsø is a Danish cow's milk cheese named after the island of Samsø located in Denmark. It was invented in the later 19th century (1870s) when the king of Denmark invited Swiss cheesemakers to teach their skill. It is similar to Emmentaler, although its flavour is milder: gentle and nutty in young cheeses and pungent with sweet and sour notes in older ones. Samsø's interior has a supple, elastic texture; a yellow colour; and a few large, irregular holes. The cheese has goldenrod coloured rind covered with a yellow wax.

== See also ==
- List of cheeses
