= Palmita cheese =

Venezuelan cheese

Palmita cheese (queso palmita) is a soft, salty, fresh white farm cheese from Venezuela. The palmita cheese is usually made in large circular containers 6 feet in diameter and four feet in height. Each batch of palmita cheese can vary in taste depending on the ingredients which are mixed slowly for 2 to 3 days until the cheese has settled. Then the containers are set for an additional 10 days until coagulation. For the best taste, it is imperative that the cheese reaches an optimum level of saltiness. It is packaged into pressed wooden crates of 30 kilos each and set for distribution. Once the cheese is packaged, it must be sold within two to three days due to the sweating (loss of liquid) of the cheese from the boxes.

Palmita cheese is originally from the Zulia State in northwestern Venezuela, which is the main source of dairy products in the country. A softer type of cheese from this region is known as palmizulia.
