= Höfðingi =

Type of Icelandic cheese

- Country of origin: Iceland
- Source of milk: Cows
- Texture: Soft-ripened
- Fat content: 22%
- Aging time: Approx. 4 weeks

Höfðingi (Icelandic pronunciation: [ˈhœvðiɲcɪ], chieftain) is a type of Icelandic cheese, described as a "creamy-soft, almost runny cheese with a white rind/crust and a smooth, mild flavor." It has been described as similar to brie cheese.
