= Pikauba (cheese) =

Canadian cheese

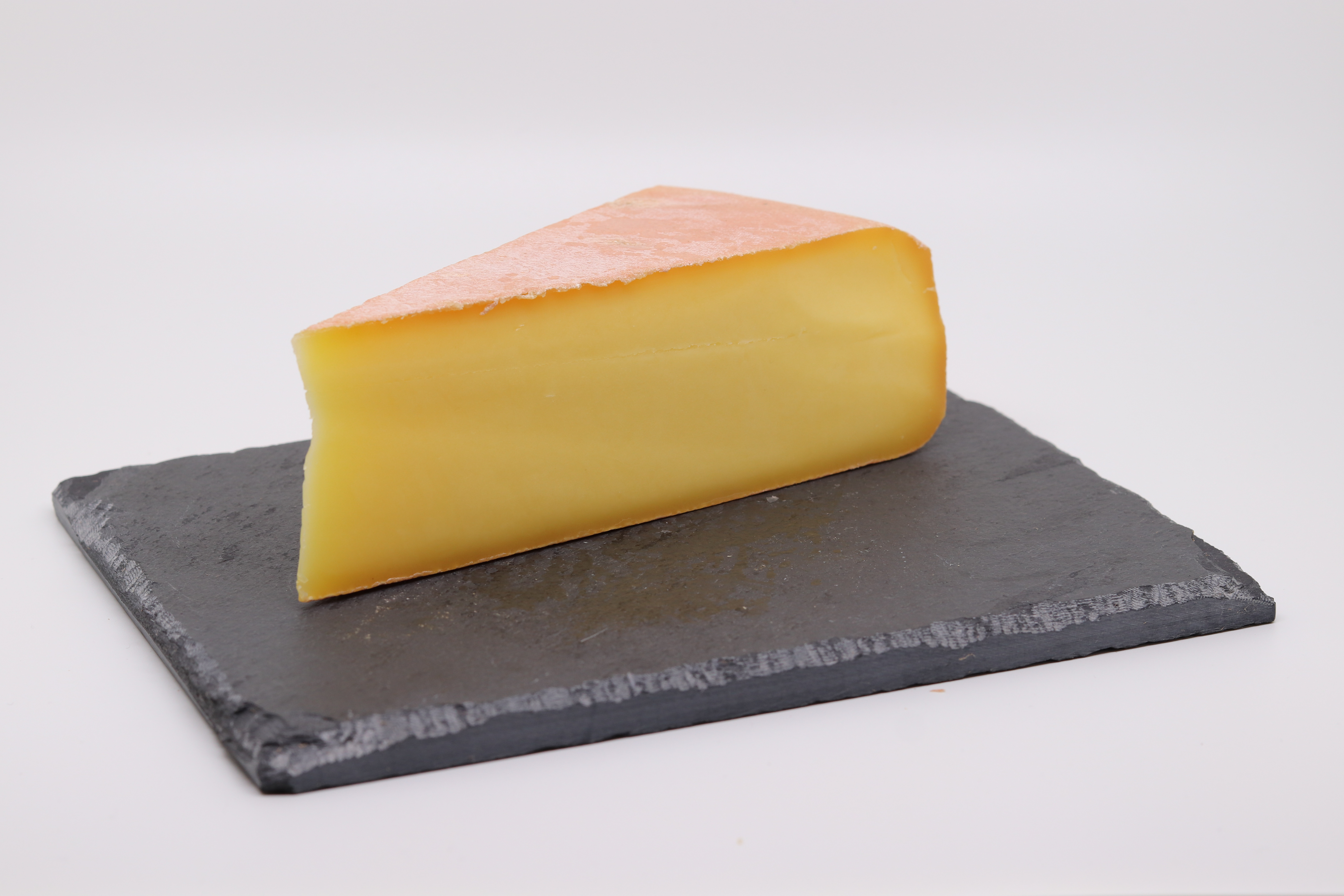
- Country of origin: Canada
- Region: Quebec
- Town: Saguenay–Lac-Saint-Jean, Saguenay (city)
- Source of milk: Cows milk
- Texture: Semi-firm
- Weight: 2.5 kg or 5 kg
- Aging time: between 90 and 120 days

The Pikauba is a semi-firm cheese, farmer made by hand, in the region Saguenay–Lac-Saint-Jean in Quebec. It takes its name from a river, Pikauba River, that crosses the Laurentides Wildlife Reserve.

It is recognized by its fine orange rind and its soft, golden paste, strewn with small holes. Medium in intensity, Pikauba has a buttery taste with fruity aromas. It comes in 2.5 kg or 5 kg format.

== The production territory ==
Pikauba is made at Lehman cheese dairy located in Hébertville in Saguenay-Lac-Saint-Jean (Quebec). The quality of the fodder plants, the freshness of the cool climate as well as the terroir of the region offer favorable conditions for cheese making.

== The story ==
The Lehmann Cheese Factory has been in existence since 2001. It is from the recipe, scribbled on a piece of paper by his mother from Jura, Switzerland, that Jacob Lehman makes the first cheeses.

The cheese family says that a quote from Félix Leclerc provided them with the inspiration to produce cheese:“Our lives are like rivers; the calm is deep, the restless flow on the surface.” The Pikauba was produced for the first time in 2005.

A novel by Gérard Bouchard is also entitled Pikaubaa,

== Manufacturing ==
This semi-soft, washed-rind cheese is made with thermised cow's milk. Maturing lasts between 90 and 120 days.

Production is based on a herd of 60 Brown Swiss cows, which is said to be the oldest dairy breed. This mountain cow is appreciated for its ability to give rich milk and a very good cheese yield.

== Distinction ==
- Finalist at the 2014 Canadian Fine Cheese Competition, category of the best semi-soft cheese.

== See also ==
- List of cheeses
