= Basa (cheese) =

Type of cheese

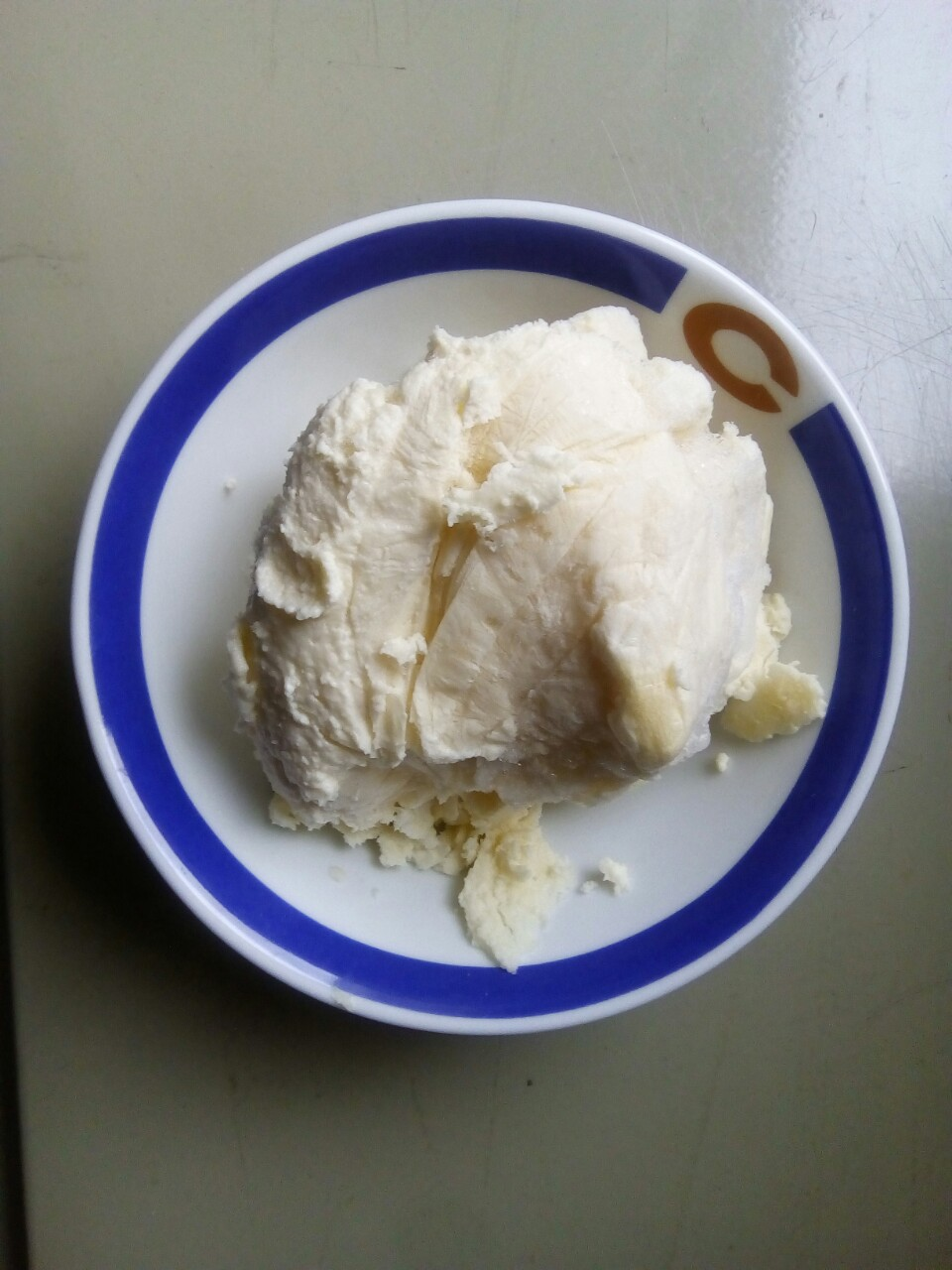
- Basa cheese
- Country of origin: Croatia, Bosnia
- Region: Lika, Bosnian Krajina

Basa is a type of soft white cheese traditionally prepared in Lika (Croatia) and parts of Bosanska Krajina (Bosnia). It is most commonly used as a cheese spread. It is considered a specialty of these regions.

== Types ==
Basa is traditionally divided into three types:

1. Posna basa, made from skimmed milk;
2. (Regular) basa, made from a mix of skimmed and whole milk;
3. Basa pomješa, made from a mixture of standard basa and kaymak.

== Production ==
The southern parts of Bosnian Krajina are dominated by mountainous regions with karst fields and highland plateaus, making the natural conditions favorable for livestock farming. However, despite this, there was no mass production of cheese as a market commodity, so the production of basa was based on primitive methods for the household's own needs.

The Croatian newspaper "Mljekarstvo," in an article from 1962 dedicated to cheese production in the southern parts of Bosnian Krajina, states: "In some parts of these regions, there is a rooted understanding that dairy products are not market commodities, as they belong to the domain of housewives. This understanding causes dairy products to be made in an old and primitive way, contributing to a great variety of products with a poor assortment."

An analysis of basa samples from the Lika region, conducted in 1983 by Dr. Ljerka Kršev, showed that industrial production of basa for the wider market is possible using standard dairy equipment.

Today, commercial production of basa in the Lika-Senj County mainly takes place within small rural farms. In Bosnian Krajina, production is prevalent around Bosanski Petrovac, and to a lesser extent, it is also present among some producers in Vojvodina.

The Municipality of Petrovac-Drinić, in its development strategy (2011–2016), mentioned creating conditions for the branding of basa.

== Preparation ==
It is mainly prepared from cow's milk, and less commonly from goat's and sheep's milk.

Cheese production is mostly carried out at home, and the preparation method can vary not only from place to place but also from household to household. Variations in preparation extend not only to the production technology but also to the ingredients used.

=== Recipe ===
According to field research conducted in 1974 in the vicinity of Vrhovine and Otočac, the recipe for preparing Lika basa was as follows:

1. Freshly milked milk is strained through a clean gauze, then cooked for 15 minutes over low heat.
2. The pot is removed from the stove until the milk temperature drops to 45 degrees Celsius.
3. The cream on the surface is then removed.
4. The milk is poured into a container typically used for making basa cheese, and sour milk from the previous day is added. The ratio is 1/2 tablespoon of sour milk to 1 liter of milk.
5. The milk is mixed well, then the pot is covered and wrapped with a clean cloth and left in a warm place (near the stove).
6. After 4–5 hours, the milk curdles, after which it is transferred to a cool room to cool down.
7. The cooled milk is transferred to a clean linen cloth, through which the whey is drained over the next 18 hours.
8. The resulting soft cheese is mixed with cream and salt to taste, then the additions are well mixed with the obtained cheese.

== Popular culture ==
In the village of Smoljana, in the municipality of Bosanski Petrovac, a traditional event dedicated to this cheese called "Days of Basa and Potatoes" is held.

Dragan Torbica, a fictional character from the television series "Državni posao," is a great lover of this food, and it is often mentioned in the series in the context of Krajina specialties.
