= Tybo Charcoal Kilns =

- U.S. National Register of Historic Places
- Location within Nevada Location within the United States
- Nearest city: Tybo, Nevada
- Coordinates: 38°22′18″N 116°25′49″W
- Area: 0.5 acres (0.20 ha)
- Built: 1874
- NRHP reference No.: 74001149
- Added to NRHP: November 19, 1974

The Tybo Charcoal Kilns are a pair of charcoal kilns located 4 miles (6.4 km) north of Tybo, Nevada. Both kilns are 30 feet (9.1 m) tall and 25 feet (7.6 m) in diameter and were built from rocks and mud. The kilns each have three openings: a top opening, a door at ground level, and a rear window with a ramp for wood wagons. The kilns were among 15 built in 1874 for the Tybo Consolidated Company. The company, which mined the region's silver, used charcoal to fuel its smelting furnace. To acquire its fuel, it imported wood from nearby hills, which it then converted to charcoal in the kilns.

The kilns were built during a mining boom in the area around Tybo. Though the community had only been settled in 1870, by the end of the decade it had a post office, school, newspaper, and almost 1000 residents.

The kilns were added to the National Register of Historic Places on November 19, 1974.
