= Çömlek cheese =

Cheese from Central Anatolia, Turkey

- Other names: Comlek peyniri
- Country of origin: Turkey
- Region, town: Cappadocia
- Region: Central Anatolia
- Source of milk: cows or sheep

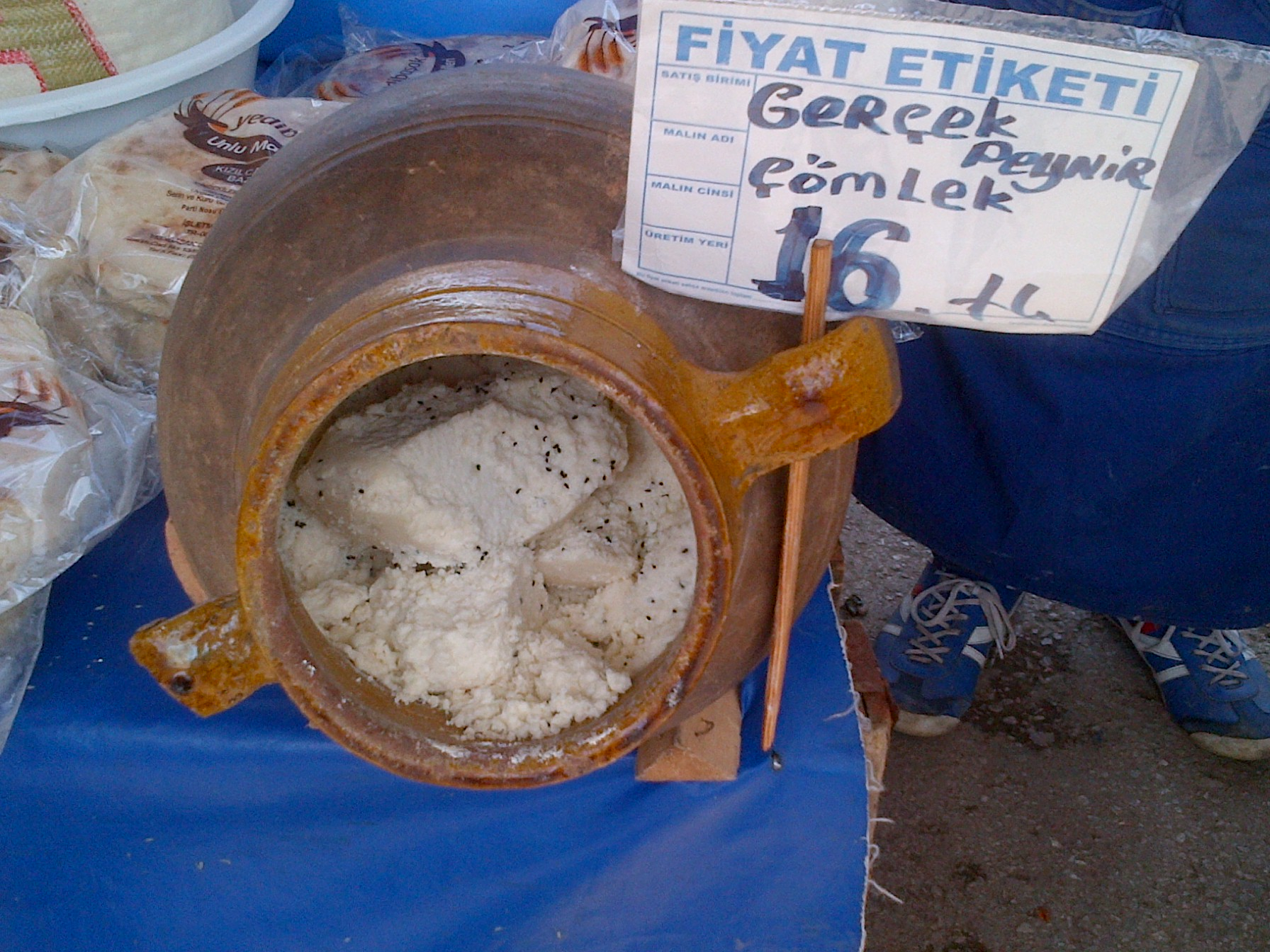

Çömlek cheese is a typical artisanal cheese from Central Anatolia, meaning "pot cheese."

== See also ==
- Pot cheese
