= Tybo, Nevada =

Unincorporated community in Nevada, US

- Unincorporated community
- Location within Nevada
- Coordinates: 38°22′12″N 116°24′04″W
- Country: United States
- State: Nevada
- County: Nye
- Elevation: 6,588 ft (2,008 m)
- Time zone: UTC-8 (Pacific (PST))
  - Summer (DST): UTC-7 (PDT)
- Area code: 775
- GNIS feature ID: 856158

Tybo is an unincorporated community in Nye County, Nevada, United States. Tybo is 8 miles (13 km) northwest of U.S. Route 6 and 10 miles (16 km) northeast of Warm Springs. The community was established in the 1870s as a silver mining town. Its name came from the Shoshone word tybbabo or tai-vu, meaning "white man's district". The community prospered in the 1870s; its population neared 1000, and it had a school, post office, and newspaper by the end of the decade. A variant is Tyboe found on Wheeler's map of 1871.

The Tybo Charcoal Kilns in Tybo are located on the National Register of Historic Places.
