= Guayanés cheese =

Cow's milk cheese from Venezuela

Guayanés is a soft, salty, white cow's-milk cheese originating from the Guayana Region in the south east of Venezuela.

== See also ==
- List of cheeses
