= Brânză de vaci =

Romanian cheese

Brânză de vaci, literally translated as “cow cheese”, is a type of fresh dairy product made from whole milk, the product resembles quark (dairy product). It is traditional in the cuisines of Moldova, Romania and Slavic-speaking countries.

== Production ==
Fresh milk is kept at room temperature 22-23° for about 36 hours until it becomes sour and it coagulates, the fatty content rises to the top of the milk. The top layer is a dairy product named smântână, comparable to crème fraîche. After collecting the fatty layer, the rest of the milk can be mixed vigorously and consumed as kefir. To make the cow cheese, the soured milk is heated gently not exceeding 50 °C, until the whey separates at the edges, the milk is caught in the middle and the fatty content floats on the surface. The content is gently mixed to incorporate the fat into the large pieces of cheese forming in the middle. The slightly cooled composition will be strained through a cheesecloth or a gauze. With the whey strained, the cheese in the gauze retains a spherical shape. It is soft, white and crumbly.

== Common uses ==
In Moldova, brânză de vaci is used predominantly in plăcintă, dumplings, syrniki.
