= Allegretto cheese =

Allegretto cheese is a type of sheep milk cheese from Quebec.

The cheese is produced by La Vache a Maillotte cheese factory in La Sarre, in the Abitibi region of Quebec, which has a Nordic climate. As a result of the cold climate, the grass in pastures has a higher sugar content which results in sweeter milk. It is a pressed curd cheese made with thermalized sheep's milk. It is typically aged in 3.5 kilogram wheels for 120 days. It is a semi-soft, washed-rind cheese.
