= List of Polish cheeses =

This is a list of cheeses from Poland. The history of cheesemaking in Poland goes back to 5500 BC, when cheese similar to mozzarella was produced in Neolithic times in Kujawy (north-central Poland).

Poland is the 6th largest cheese producer in the world and has the 18th highest cheese consumption. Marek Kosmulski described over 600 types of Polish cheeses manufactured between 1948 and 2019.

Some Polish cheeses are protected by European Union law as regional products.

== Polish cheeses ==
Name	Image	Region	Description
Bałtycki			Polish brand of cheese.
Bryndza			Sheep milk cheese made in Poland, Slovakia. Recipes differ slightly across the countries.
Bryndza Podhalańska		Podhale region.	Polish variety of the soft cheese bryndza. It is prepared with sheep milk and was registered in the European Union's Register of protected designations of origin and protected geographical indications on June 11, 2007 as a Protected Designation of Origin (PDO).
Bundz		Traditionally produced in Podhale.	A sheep milk cheese.
Bursztyn			A brand of cheese. It is a mature cheese similar to Gruyere.
Edamski		Mazuria.	A rennet cheese based on Dutch Edammer.
Farmer cheese			In Poland, farmer cheese is similar in consistency to cottage cheese. The cheese is formed into a loaf. It is sometimes referred to as "pot cheese."
Gołka		Silesian Voivodeship.	Similar to oscypek, but made with milk from cattle.
Gryficki		Gryfice Dairy, province of Szczecin.	Production began in 1973.
Hauskyjza		Wielkopolska, Pomerania, Kuyavia, and Silesia.	Foodstuff made of cottage cheese, caraway and other ingredients, which are mixed, put aside for a few days to acquire the characteristic sharp flavor and tacky consistency, and then warmed and fried.
Kortowski			
Koryciński		Podlaskie Voivodeship in eastern Poland.	Hard yellow cheese made from cows' milk. Named after the town of Korycin.
Królewski		Northwestern Masovia.	"Royal cheese"; similar in taste and appearance to Swiss Emmental.
Liliput		Wielkopolska.	A cows' milk cheese.
Lechicki			Known in Poland as Brochocki cheese, which derives from the name of the farmer who began producing it.
Łowicki			
Lubuski			
Mazurski			A brand of cheese.
Morski			Mild, semi-soft cheese made from pasteurized cow's milk. Melts well, often used as a table cheese.
Oscypek		Made exclusively in the Tatra Mountains region of Poland.	Smoked sheep milk cheese. There is also a smaller form called redykołka, known as the 'younger sister' of oscypek.
Przeworski			A rennet cheese, classified as ripening, produced from cow's milk and an infusion of mint and marjoram. It has a delicately spicy taste and an aroma of herbs. Named after the town of Przeworsk in the Subcarpathian Voivodeship.
Radamer		From Polesie.	A cows' milk cheese, with Dutch and Swiss influence.
Redykołka		Produced in the Podhale region.	Sometimes known as the "younger sister" of Oscypek and the two are occasionally confused. The cheese is often made in the shape of animals, hearts, or decorative wreaths.
Rokpol		Wielkopolska.	Polish blue cheese similar to Danish blue cheeses. The name derives from Roquefort and suggests that it is a Polish Roquefort, however, it is made with cows' milk.
Słupski chłopczyk		Produced in Słupsk.	A Camembert-type cheese, produced before the second world war, reintroduced in 2007, but the production was stopped in 2013.
Twaróg			Also known as ser biały. Pictured is Polish twaróg in the traditional wedge shape.
Tylżycki		Mazuria.	A yellow cheese made from cow's milk. A semi-hard cheese that is a variety of Tilsiter.
Wielkopolski ser smażony		Wielkopolska.	A fried cheese served as a dip similar to fondue.
Zamojski			
Zgorzelecki			A semi-hard, yellow cheese made from cows' milk.
Żuławski			

== See also ==
- List of cheeses
- Polish cuisine
- List of cheesemakers
