= Hutsul bryndza =

Cheese from the Hutsul region of Ukraine

Hutsul bryndza (Ukrainian: Гуцульська бриндза,) is a type of Ukrainian cheese, produced from either sheep's or cow's milk, which has the status of a geographical indication in Ukraine.

Hutsul bryndza has been produced in the Hutsul region for several centuries and is an integral part of Hutsul cuisine and culture.

== Hutsul sheep bryndzya ==
Hutsul sheep bryndzya (Hutsul dialect: бриндзя) is the first geographical indication that meets Ukrainian requirements and is eligible for recognition in the EU. The application for this status was submitted by the Public Union "Association of Producers of Traditional Carpathian High Mountain Cheeses" in 2018.

Hutsul sheep bryndzya is an uncooked table cheese made from the milk of Ukrainian Mountain-Carpathian sheep in an amount of at least 80%, with the possibility of adding no more than 20% cow's or goat's milk. The sheep graze on high-mountain summer pastures in the Ukrainian Carpathians. The geographical indication is certified.

== Hutsul cow bryndza ==
Hutsul cow's milk bryndza became the second Ukrainian registered geographical indication food product after Hutsul sheep bryndzya. It is a similar uncooked table cheese made from cow's milk in an amount of at least 70%, with the possibility of adding no more than 30% sheep's or goat's milk.

== Characteristics ==
For the inhabitants of the Hutsul region, bryndza is one of the main traditional staple dishes, after bread, kulish (millet porridge) and banosh. The sheep's milk cheese is made from the milk of sheep grazing on mountain meadows, following techniques that date to the 15th century and have been passed down from generation to generation by the population of the Hutsul region.

== Recognition ==
- In Rakhiv, a "Hutsul Bryndza" festival is held annually.
- In Kolochava, there is a monument to a shepherd with a small sheep.

== See also ==
- Hutsul sheep bryndzya
