= Redykołka =

Type of traditional Polish cheese

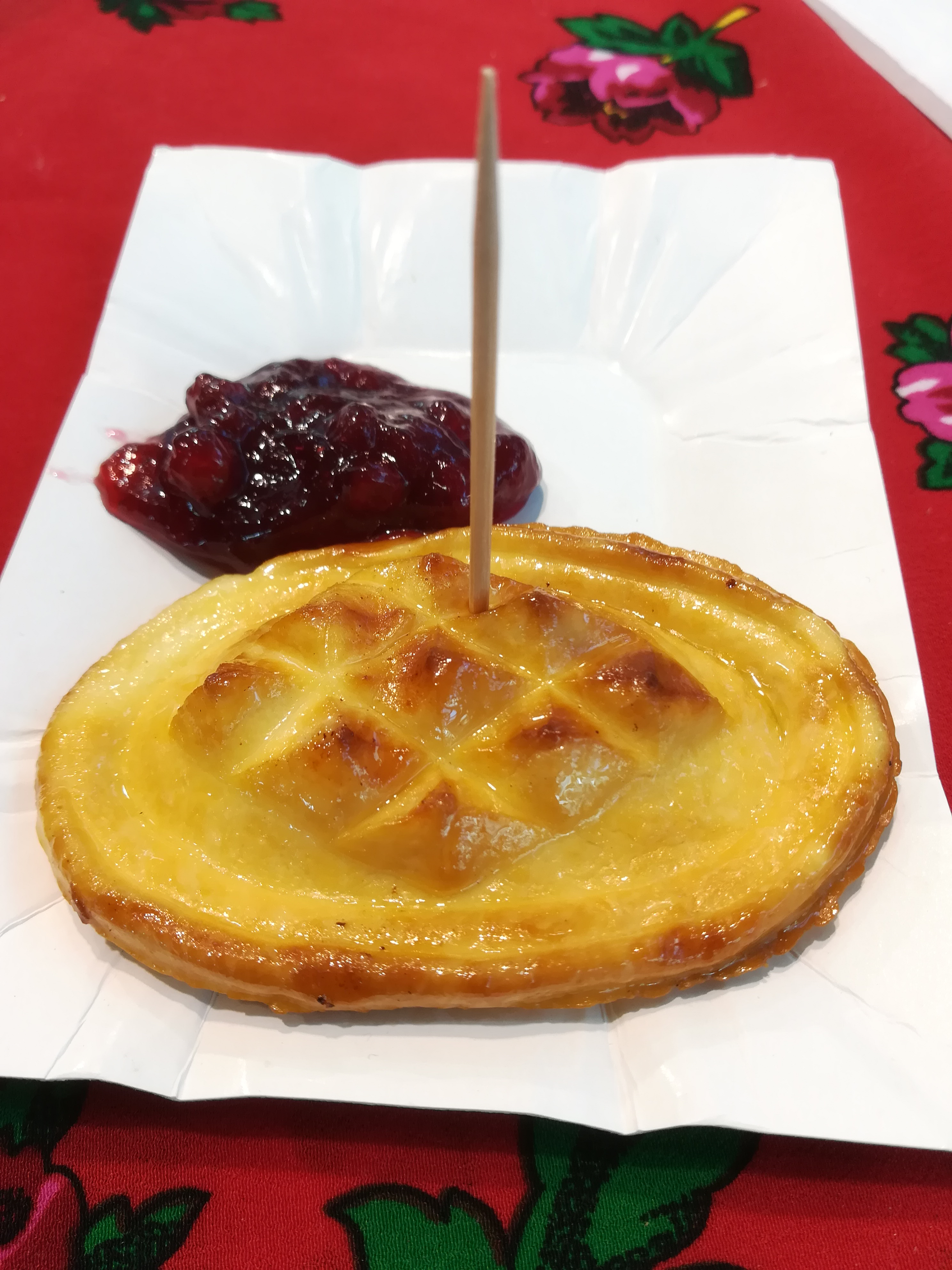
Grilled redykołka with cranberry sauce

Redykołka is a type of cheese produced in the Podhale region of Poland. It is sometimes known as the "younger sister" of the Oscypek cheese and the two are occasionally confused. The similarity comes from the fact that redykołka is traditionally made using leftover Bundz from Oscypek production.

The protected recipe describes the cheese as solid, with a soft and elastic inside, a strong smoked aroma, and with a spicy and slightly salty taste. It is often made in the shape of animals, hearts, or decorative wreaths.

== History ==
Redykołka has been popular as a form of a gift, made and given in pairs for special occasions. It was also given out to commemorate the return of sheep from a months long grazing period in the mountain pastures, a celebration known as redyk. The name "redykołka" used to refer to any kind of cheese gift.

Redykołka is registered as a European Union protected designation of origin (PDO) since 2009.
