= Lubuski =

Lubuski may refer to:

- coming from Lubusz Voivodeship / Lubusz Land
- Ser Lubuski, typ of cheese: List of Polish cheeses
- Podpiwek Lubuski, Polish non-alcoholic beverage
- Gin Lubuski, gin by Henkell & Co. Sektkellerei
- Mieszko Lubuski (1223/27 – 1242), a member of the Silesian Piasts, was Duke of Lubusz
- Toruń Lubuski, small town in Sulęcin County, Lubusz Voivodeship, now as Torzym
- Stadion Lubuski, name for Stadion SOSiR (Słubice)
