= Serhiy Ionushas =

Ukrainian politician

- Сергій Іонушас
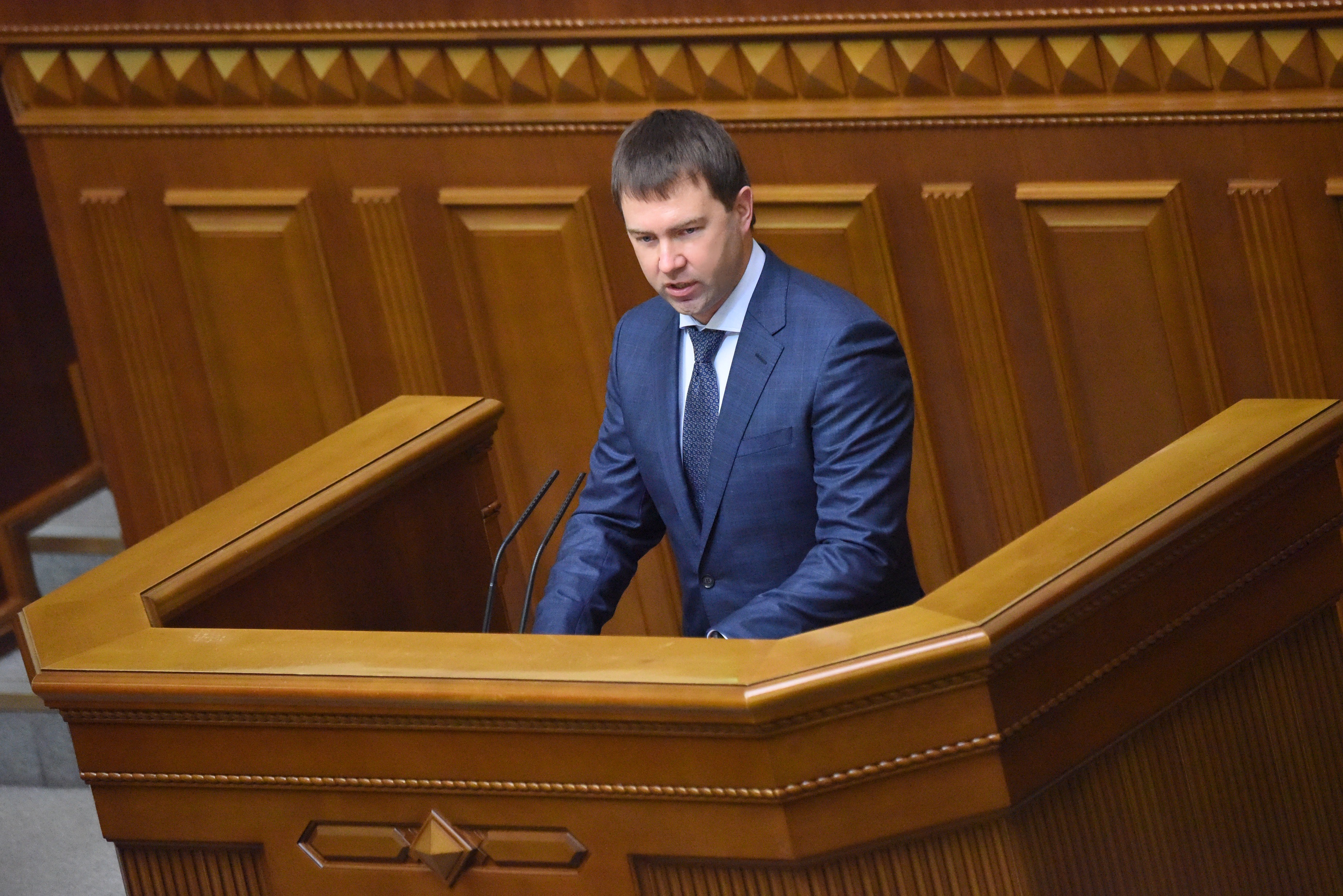
- Ionushas in 2021

People's Deputy of Ukraine
- Incumbent
- Assumed office 28 August 2019
- Constituency: Servant of the People, No. 38

Personal details
- Born: 18 October 1979 (age 46) Leningrad, Russian SFSR, Soviet Union (now Saint Petersburg, Russia)
- Party: Servant of the People
- Other political affiliations: Independent
- Education: Yaroslav Mudryi National Law University; Ukrainian Institute of Industrial Property; Taras Shevchenko National University of Kyiv

Serhiy Kostiantynovych Ionushas (Ukrainian: Сергій Костянтинович Іонушас; born 18 October 1979) is a Ukrainian politician currently serving as a People's Deputy of Ukraine on the proportional list of Servant of the People since 2019. He is also head of the Verkhovna Rada Law Enforcement Committee and the Legal Reform Commission. Prior to his election, he was a lawyer.

== Early life and career ==
Serhiy Kostiantynovych Ionushas was born in the city of Leningrad (now Saint Petersburg) on 18 October 1979.

Ionushas obtained a law degree with honours from the Yaroslav Mudryi National Law University. He also studied in the Ukrainian Institute of Industrial Property where he obtained master's degree with honours. His specialisation at the institute was intellectual property. Ionushas also studied at the Taras Shevchenko National University of Kyiv Institute of International Relations under the program "Legislative stages in Ukraine: Kyiv and selected regions", and graduated with a specialisation in European Law.

Following his graduation, Ionushas worked as a legal executive. He is a member of Ukrainian Bar Association and the Ukrainian Lawyer' Association, and has authored publications and reports on copyright protection and industrial property.

Ionushas was formerly head of the Gelon law firm. One of his clients during this time was the Kvartal 95 Studio.

== Political career ==
In the 2019 Ukrainian presidential election Ionushas worked for Volodymyr Zelenskyy's ultimately-successful campaign, and was a personal adviser to Zelenskyy on legal matters.

During the 2019 Ukrainian parliamentary election Ionushas was a candidate on the proportional list of the Servant of the People party. At the time of the election he was an independent. He was successfully elected to the Verkhovna Rada (Ukraine's parliament).

Ionushas is head of the Verkhovna Rada Law Enforcement Committee. He has also been a member of the Legal Reform Commission since 7 August 2019. On 29 October 2020 he was appointed to the position of the head of the Law Reform Commission by Zelenskyy.

== Awards and titles ==
- Honorary title of Honored Lawyer of Ukraine (August 23, 2021) — for significant personal contribution to state building, strengthening defense capabilities, socio-economic, scientific and technical, cultural and educational development of the Ukrainian state, significant labor achievements, many years of conscientious work, and on the occasion of the 30th anniversary of Ukraine's independence.
