= Hutsul sheep bryndzya =

Sheep's milk cheese from the Carpathian Mountains

- Country of origin: Ukraine
- Region: Ukrainian Carpathians
- Source of milk: Sheep milk (≥80%; up to 20% cow’s or goat’s milk allowed)
- Pasteurized: Traditionally unpasteurised
- Texture: Soft, crumbly
- Aging time: Ripened (bundz stage before processing)
- Certification: Geographical indication (Ukraine, 2022)

Hutsul sheep bryndzya (Ukrainian: гуцульська овеча бриндзя) is a traditional table cheese made of sheep's milk in the Ukrainian Carpathians. This cheese is associated with the culture of the Hutsuls and is an important symbol of regional identity and heritage.

It is made from sheep's milk in an amount of at least 80%, with the possibility of adding no more than 20% cow's or goat's milk.

== History ==
Hutsul sheep bryndzya is made on the mountain pastures of the Ukrainian Carpathians from the milk of the Ukrainian Carpathian mountain sheep according to traditions that date back to the 15th century.

It is produced in parts of Zakarpattia, Ivano-Frankivsk, and Chernivtsi oblasts.

== Production process ==
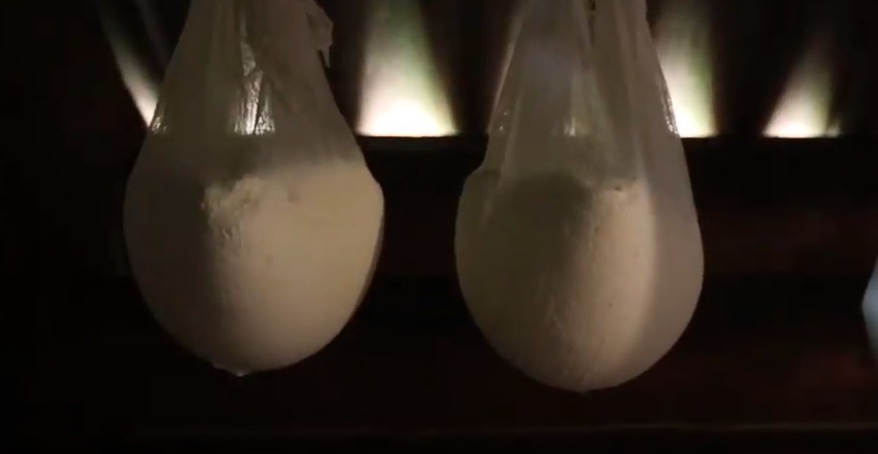
Fresh curds are placed in cheesecloth to strain excess whey, forming budz

Hutsul sheep bryndzya is produced from sheep’s milk using traditional methods in the Carpathian Mountains. Fresh milk is filtered through several layers of cheesecloth with spruce branches on top, so that all possible impurities remain at this stage, and the milk for making cheese is as pure as possible. The shepherd adds rennet to fresh sheep's milk. Using this technology, budz cheese is made. And after budz ripens, it is ground and mixed with salt, which leads to the formation of bryndzya. All processes of its production are exclusively manual.

== Recognition ==
In 2022, Hutsul sheep bryndzya became the first Ukrainian product to have a registered geographical indication that met all European requirements for registration and is eligible for recognition in the European Union.

The application for registering the geographical indication was filed by Association of Producers of Traditional Carpathian High Mountain Cheeses at the Ministry of Economy of Ukraine on December 19, 2018.

In 2022, it was included in the National Register of Intangible Cultural Heritage of Ukraine.

== Gallery ==
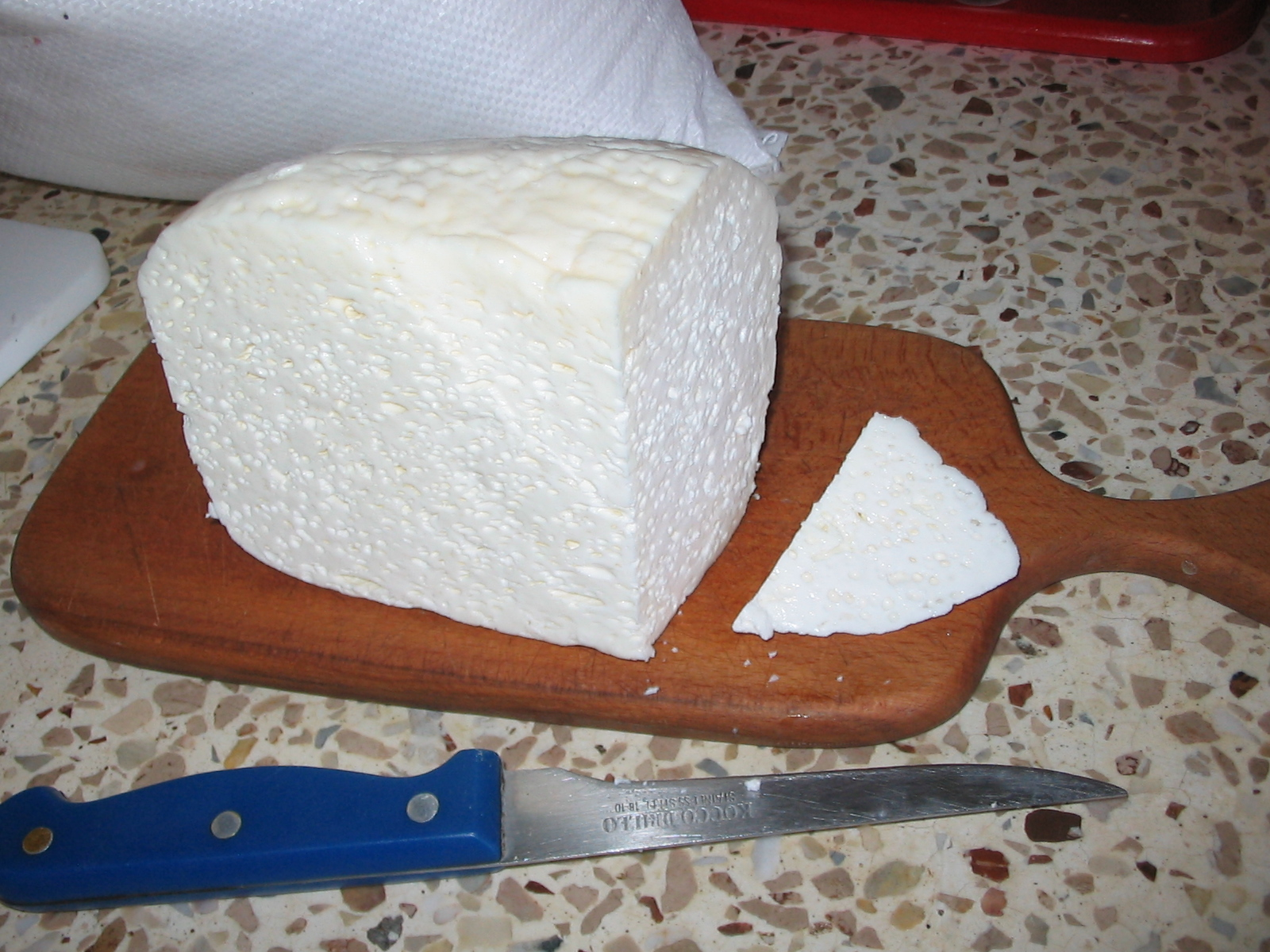
Budz cheese

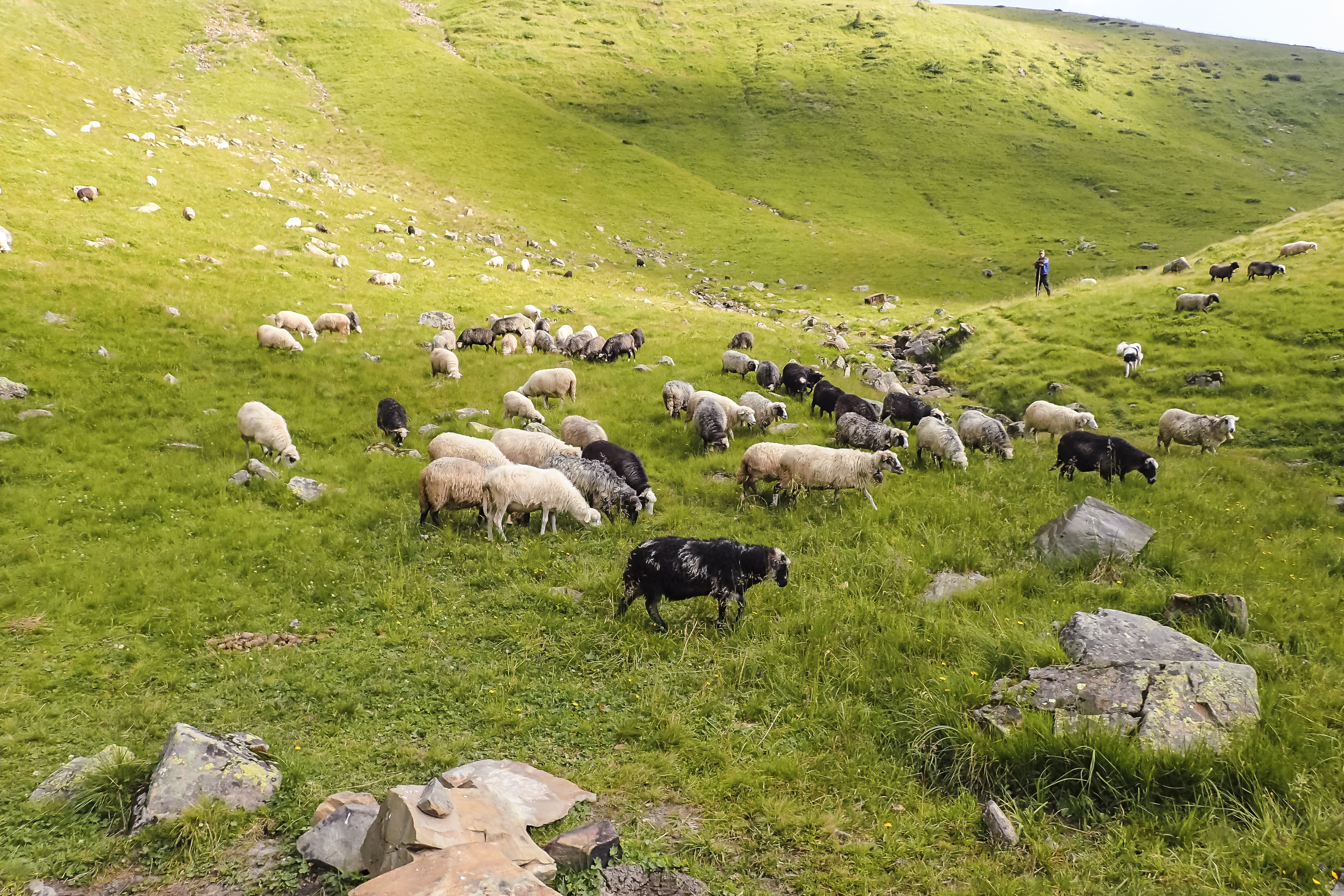
Sheep under Mount Herashaska

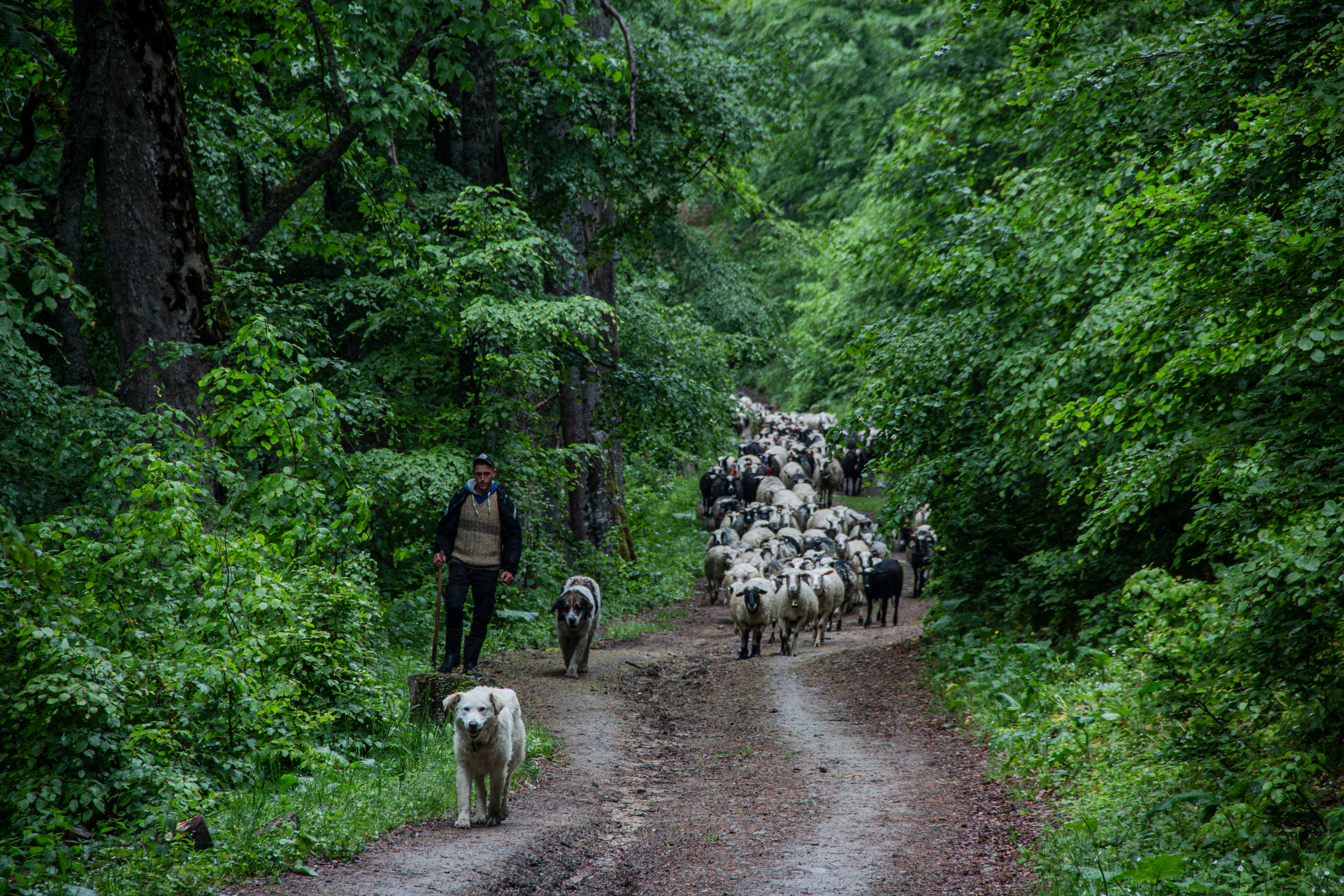
A flock of sheep climbs up the mountainside

== See also ==
- Bryndza
- Hutsul bryndza
- List of cheeses
