= Strapačky =

Dish of dumplings with sauerkraut or cheese

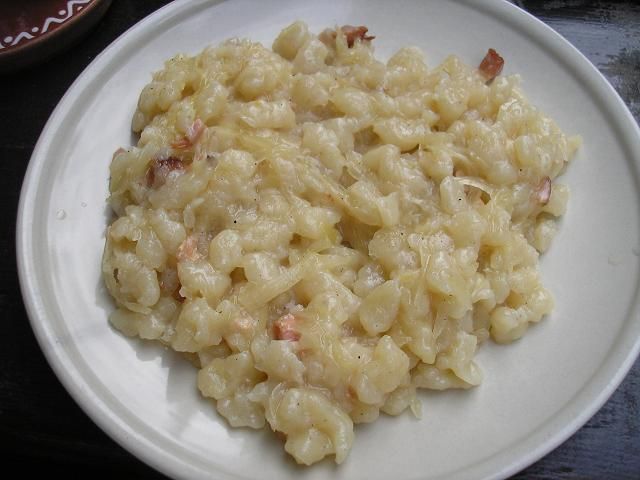
- Strapačky
- Type: Dumpling
- Place of origin: Slovakia
- Main ingredients: Halušky, sauerkraut

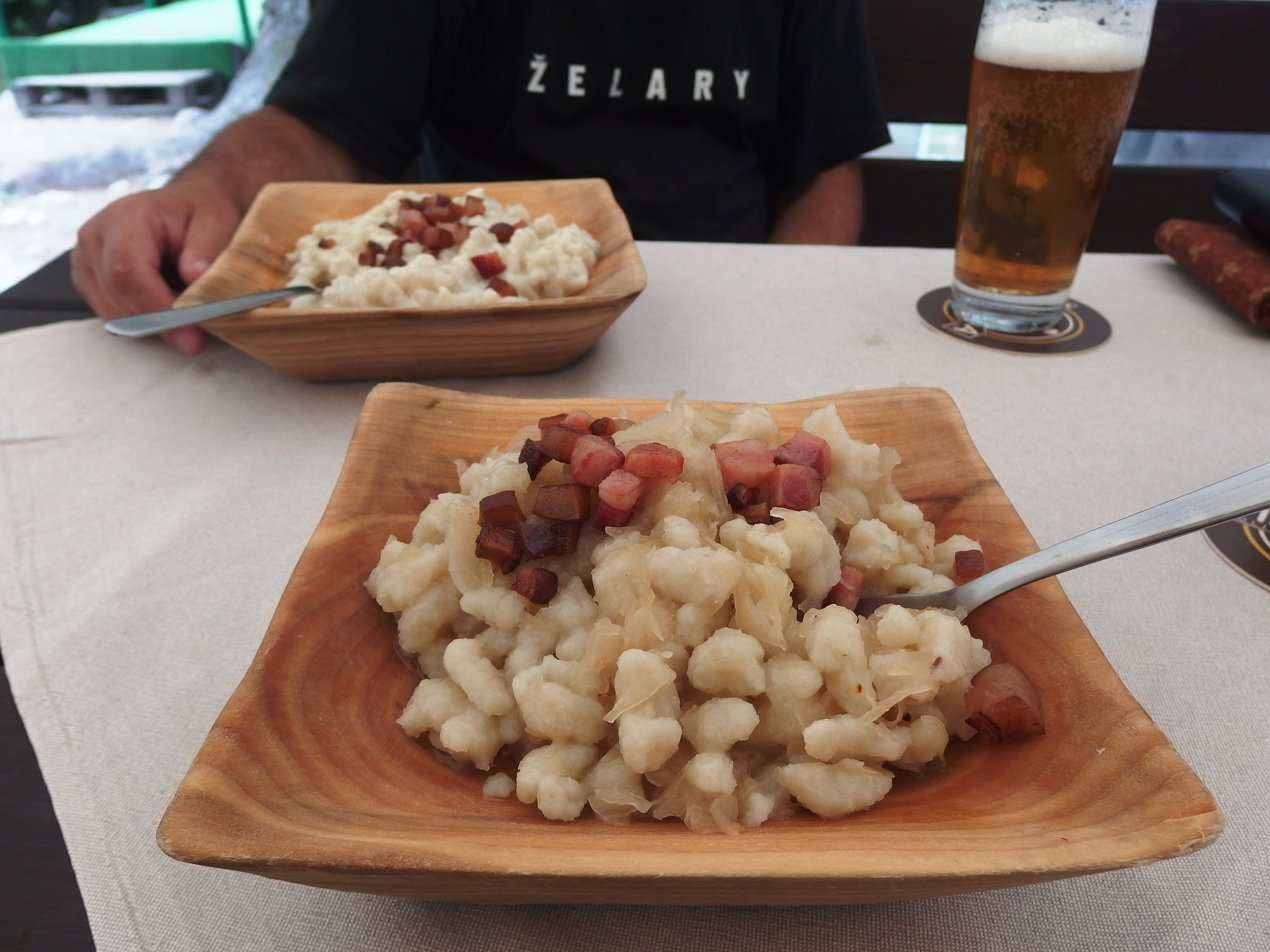
Strapačky and halušky

Strapačky (Slovak) or sztrapacska (Hungarian) is a dish popular in Slovakia and Hungary. It is similar to bryndzové halušky where the base compound of the dish is halušky (dumplings); however, in Slovakia, instead of bryndza, stewed sauerkraut is used. In Hungary, sztrapacska is traditionally accompanied with juhtúró, the local equivalent to bryndza. It is thus akin to gnocchi with ewes' cheese. Residents of Vanyarc, located in Hungary approximately 80 kilometers from Budapest, have held a Festival of Strapačky (Vanyarci Haluskafesztivál) every September for almost 40 years. Ethnic Slovaks from all over Hungary compete for prizes at the festival.

== See also ==
- Halušky
