= Zamojski =

Zamojski may refer to:

- an alternative spelling of Zamoyski, a surname and line of Polish nobles
- Zamość County, Polish name powiat zamojski, an administrative division in eastern Poland
- a type of cheese from Poland
