= Bryndzové halušky =

Traditional Slovak dish

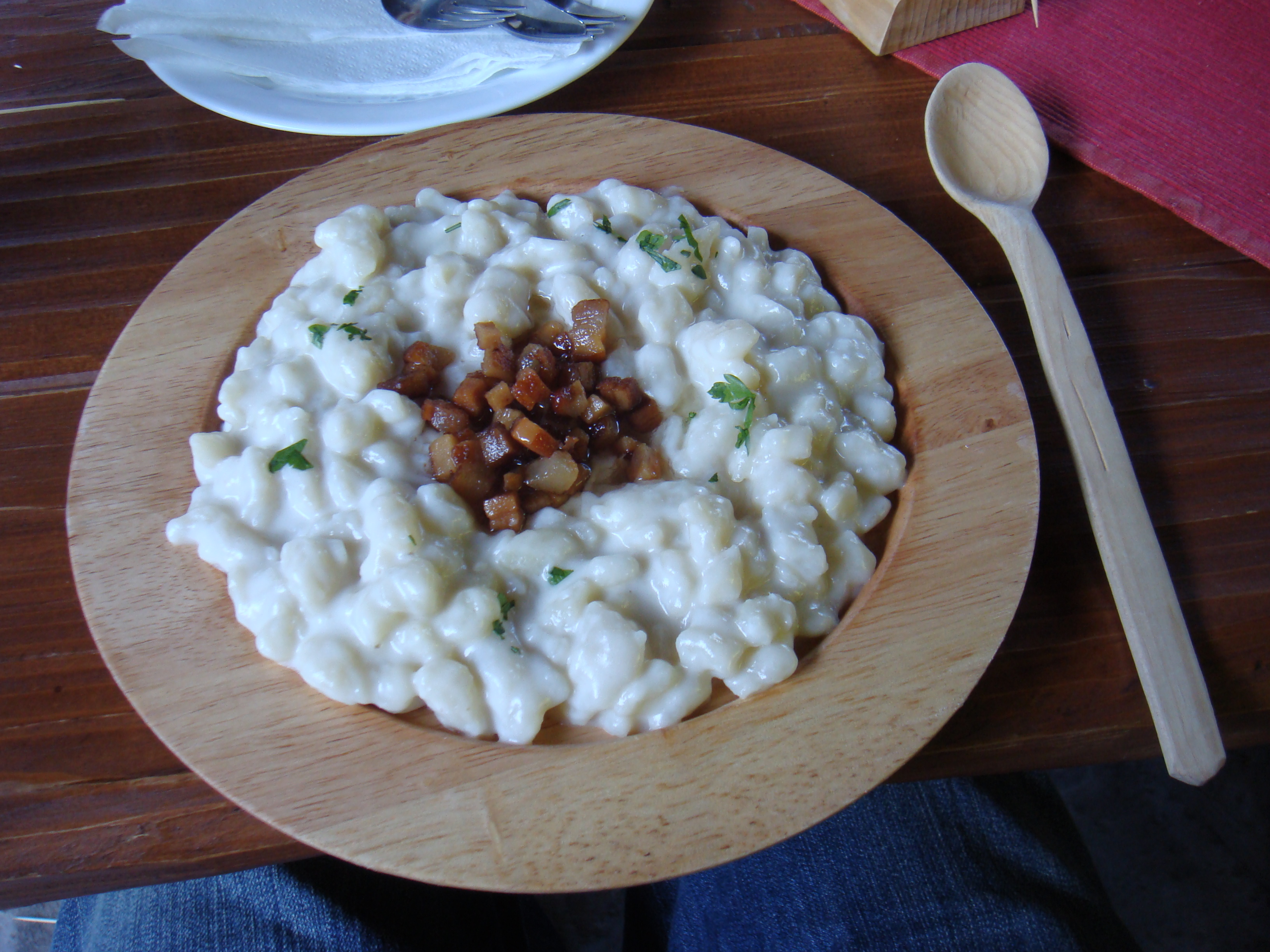
- Bryndzové halušky with bacon
- Type: Dumpling
- Place of origin: Slovakia
- Main ingredients: Halušky, bryndza

Bryndzové halušky (Slovak: [ˈbrindzɔʋeː ˈɦaluʂki]), Austrian German: Brimsennocken) is one of the national dishes in Slovakia. This meal consists of halušky (boiled lumps of potato dough similar in appearance to gnocchi) and bryndza (a soft sheep cheese), optionally sprinkled with cooked bits of smoked pork fat or bacon, and chives or spring onions.

Žinčica is traditionally drunk with this meal. There is an annual bryndzové halušky festival in Turecká that features an eating contest.

== History and terminology ==
In the Kingdom of Hungary, two types of galuska were developed at the same time: the potato galuska of the mountains and the galuska of the plains, without potatoes. Potatoes could be grown in harsher conditions and became a staple food for the poorer mountain dwellers, as less expensive flour was needed for the dough. Today the Slovaks call the soft dough dumplings with boiled potatoes and sheep's cheese bryndzové halušky, while the local Hungarians call it sztrapacska. The Slovak strapačky is a dish made mainly of dumplings with potatoes, as opposed to its Hungarian counterpart the nokedli, which do not contain potatoes.

== See also ==
- Strapačky
