= Geographical indications in Ukraine =

Protected designations of products in Ukraine

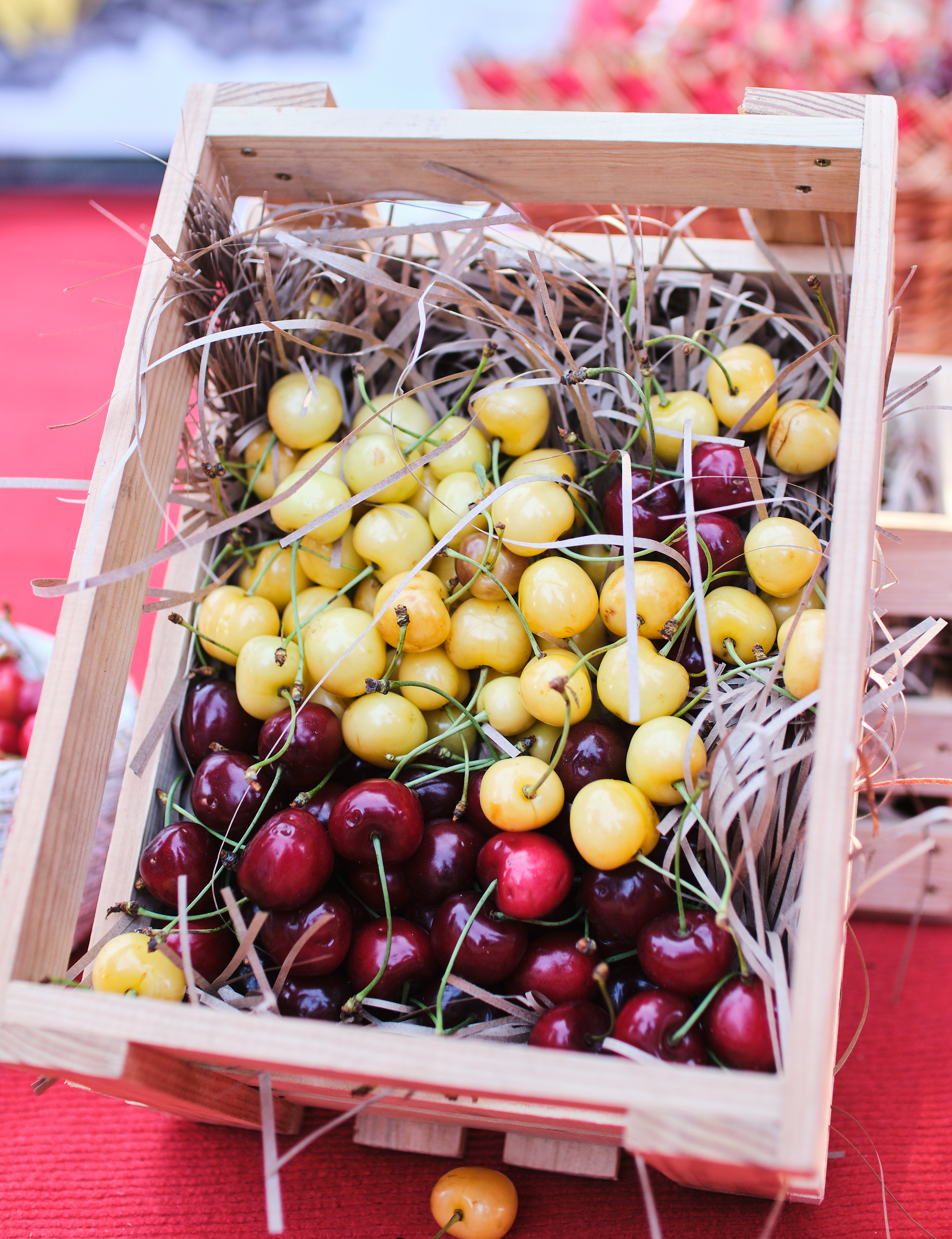
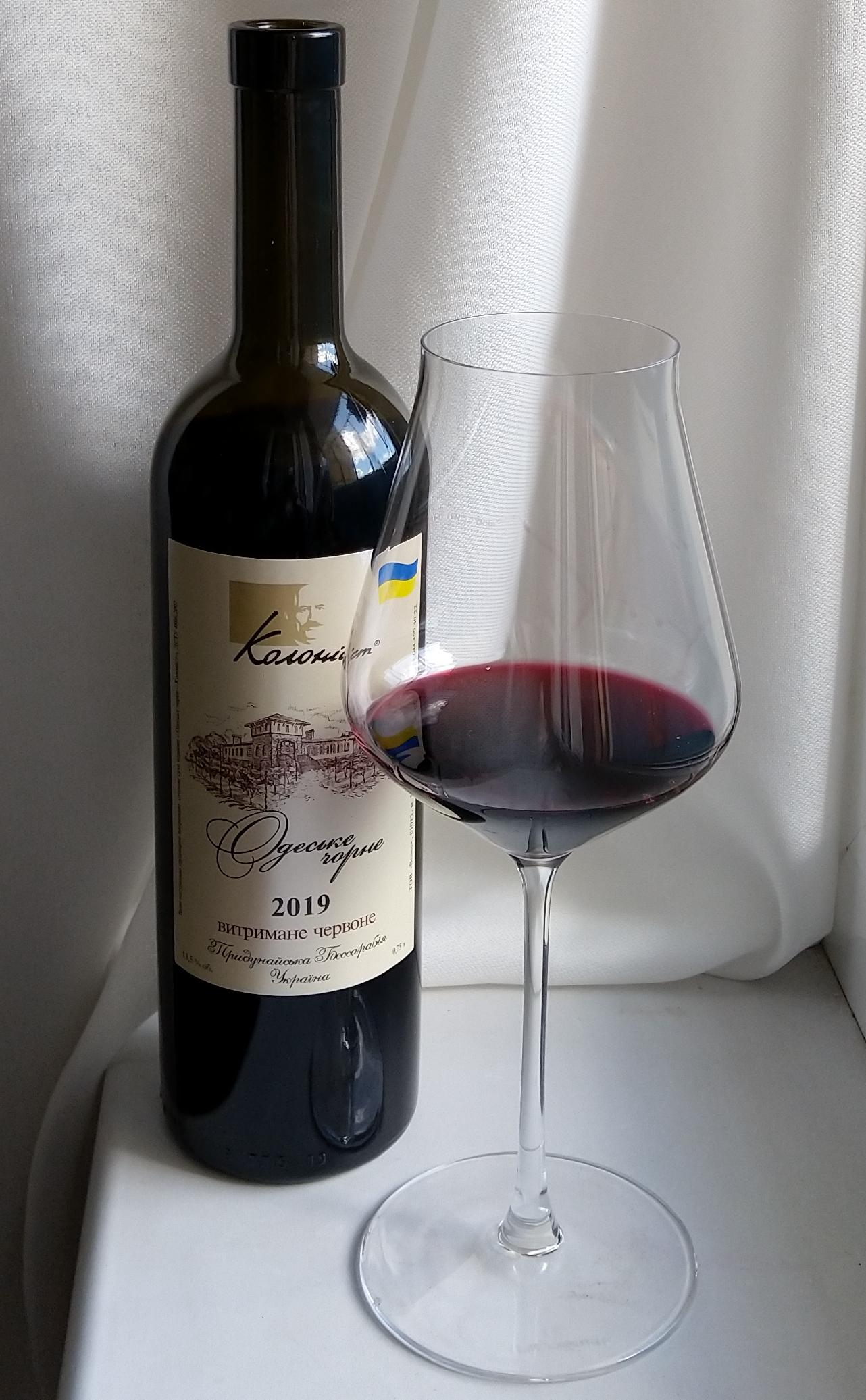
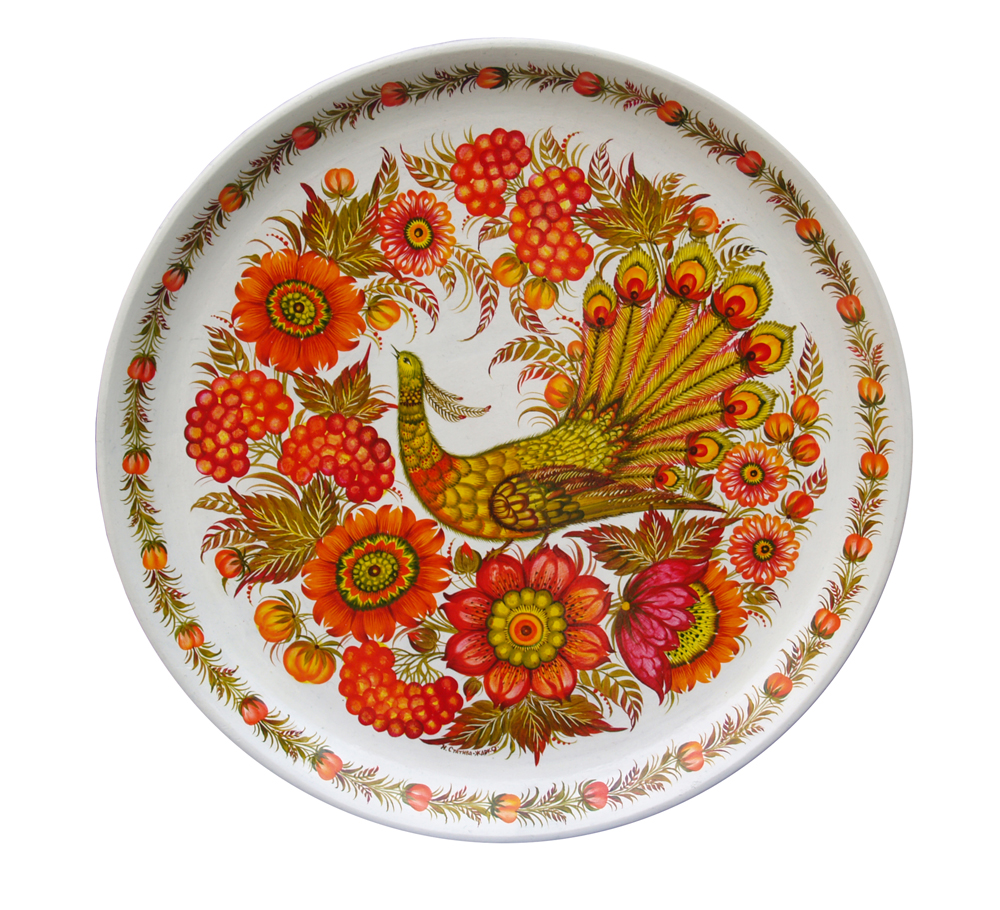
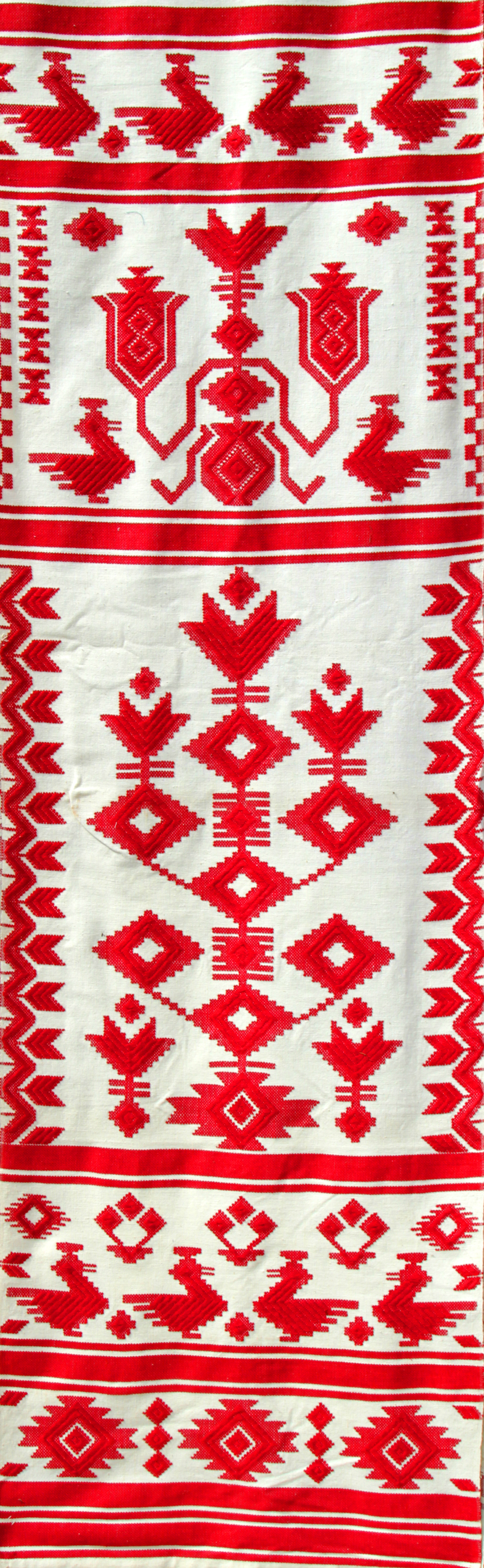
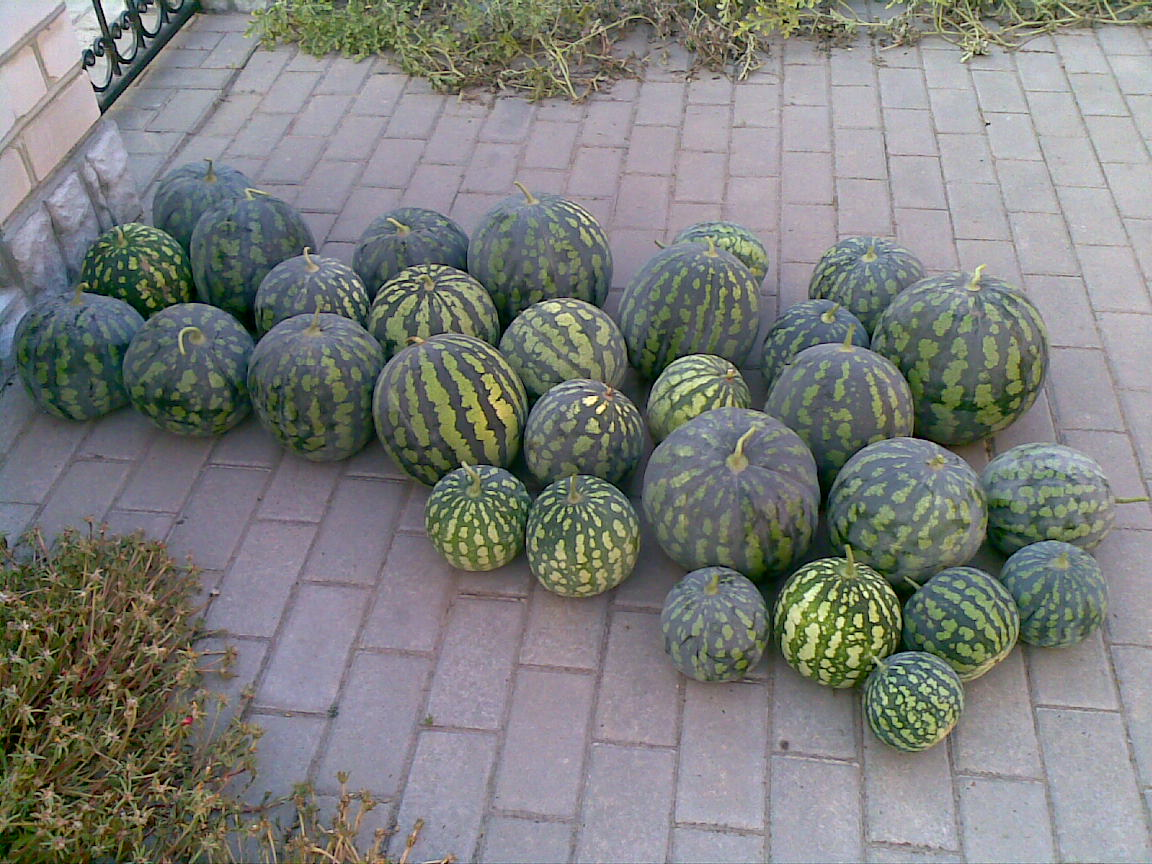
From top, left to right: Melitopol cherries, Prydunaiska Bessarabia wine, Petrykivka painting, Krolevets towel, Kherson watermelons

A geographical indication (GI) is a form of intellectual property that identifies a product as originating from a specific geographical area as its qualities or reputation are tied to its origin. Such labeling guarantees that products sold under a specific name are authentic and meet defined standards, preventing imitation goods from entering the market. The protection of geographical indications was established under the Agreement on Trade-Related Aspects of Intellectual Property Rights, signed by members of the World Trade Organization (including Ukraine) on 14 April 1994 and effective from 1 January 1995. The Lisbon Agreement for the Protection of Appellations of Origin and their International Registration, signed on 31 October 1958, also introduced appellations of origin – a special category of geographical indications that denotes a particularly strong connection between the product and its area of origin. (Note: Although Ukraine is not a signatory of the Lisbon Agreement, its national law defines and protects appellations of origin.) Unlike trademarks, geographical indications link a product's origin to a region rather than to a specific company. Agricultural products are most often registered as GIs, since their characteristics are directly tied to local geographical factors such as climate and soil, although other products, including handicrafts, have received the status as well.

The protection of geographical indications in Ukraine is regulated by the law "On Legal Protection of Geographical Indications" passed on 16 June 1999. The law has undergone multiple amendments, particularly since 2019, aimed at aligning Ukraine's framework with European Union standards in preparation of the country's accession to the EU. As a result, Ukraine's geographical indications and appellations of origin are now analogous to the EU's Protected Geographical Indication (PGI) and Protected Designation of Origin (PDO) labels. (Note: Another similar label is the Traditional Speciality Guaranteed (TSG), which applies to food products using a traditional method or recipe but not linked to a specific geographical area. Although TSGs are defined under Ukrainian law, none are currently inscribed on the national register.) Additional laws also outline the registration and protection of agricultural goods, foods, and spirits. The Ukrainian National Office for Intellectual Property and Innovations (IP Office) – the national authority responsible for intellectual property protection – reviews GI applications, manages the national GI register, and coordinates international cooperation in the field. (Note: Before the creation of the IP Office on 8 November 2022, these functions were carried out by the Ukrainian Institute of Intellectual Property.) Applications – submitted by an association of producers, or by a single legal or natural person if they are the sole producer of the good – must detail a product's connections to the geographical area, its specific method of production, and its resulting unique qualities. The IP Office may declare a GI invalid if its registration violates the law or if a court determines that the production of the good has become impossible due to changes in the geographical area. Ukraine's legislation also protects numerous foreign geographical indications and appellations of origin, specifically those established by separate agreements with the European Union, Georgia, Italy, and Russia. These items are not covered in this list as they do not originate in Ukraine.

As of November 2026, thirty items from Ukraine are listed on the country's Register of Geographical Indications, or 3,134 in total including foreign entries. Myrhorodska mineral water, Sonyachna Dolyna wine, and Skhidnytska mineral water were the first to enter the register on 15 March 2007. On 11 November 2019, Hutsul sheep bryndzya became the first registered GI to meet the requirements of the European Union. The most recent addition to the register is Frumushika steppe honey, registered on 3 September 2025. Odesa and Zakarpattia oblasts (regions) are best represented in the register, largely due to the creation of wine and taste routes in Ukrainian Bessarabia and Zakarpattia – a culinary tourism initiative supported by the European Union. In addition, since the beginning of the Russo-Ukrainian war in 2014, Russia has appropriated a number of geographical indications originating in Ukraine's occupied territories, (Note: These areas include the Autonomous Republic of Crimea and the city of Sevastopol, which were occupied and annexed by Russia in 2014, as well as Donetsk, Kherson, Luhansk, and Zaporizhzhia oblasts (regions) that have been under partial occupation since 2022 and subsequently annexed as part of the ongoing Russo-Ukrainian war. Most countries recognize Crimea and other occupied territories as de jure parts of Ukraine while de facto they remain under full or partial Russian control.) registering them under its own national system. The European Union has banned the import of goods produced in these areas.

== List of geographical indications ==
† Area of origin is located within Russian-occupied territories

Ukrainian geographical indications on the country's register
| Name (Note: The English names shown here are taken from the official product specification files when indicated. Otherwise, they come from the IP Office website. These names do not follow a single format: they may use different romanization systems, and alternative names are only occasionally accounted for. Other possible spellings are shown in footnotes. Ukrainian names are shown below with Ukrainian Wikipedia links if applicable. Some names were registered in all capitals, which is not shown here for consistency.) | Product | Registration date | Region (Note: First-level administrative division (oblast, autonomous republic, or city with special status) that contains the protected area of the product) | No. (Note: The gaps in the numbers represent foreign geographical indications and appellations of origin on the Ukrainian register, particularly those from Russia (4–6, 18, 3114), Georgia (21–42), the EU (43–3110, 3116), and Italy (17, 19, 3112, 3113, 3115).) | Type (Note: Geographical indication (GI) or appellation of origin (AO)) | Description |
|---|---|---|---|---|---|---|
| Myrhorodska Миргородська | Mineral water | 15 March 2007 | Poltava Oblast | 1 | AO | The water from Myrhorod has a distinct taste and aroma, along with medicinal properties attributed to biologically active components such as iodine, bromine, and orthoboric and metasilicic acids. |
| Sonyachna Dolyna † (Note: Protected in the European Union under the name Soniachna Dolyna (Soniachna Dolina)) Сонячна долина | Wine | 15 March 2007 | Autonomous Republic of Crimea | 2 | AO | White wine from Soniachna Dolyna is produced from locally grown grapes and aged in wooden barrels for three years. The resulting product has a honey and flower aroma with notes of peach, melon, and herbs, and contains 16% alcohol and 16% sugar. |
| Skhidnytska Східницька | Mineral water | 15 March 2007 | Lviv Oblast | 3 | AO | The water from Skhidnytsia originates from a sandy syncline near oil deposits and has a low mineral content. It contains a high concentration of bicarbonates, giving it medicinal properties. |
| Novyi Svit † (Note: Protected in the European Union under the name Novyj Svit (Novy Svet) and indicated as invalid on the IP Office website) Новий Світ | Sparkling wine | 10 September 2009 | Autonomous Republic of Crimea | 7 | AO | This sparkling wine is produced from Chardonnay, Riesling, Aligoté, and Pinot grapes grown in Novyi Svit, located in a valley nestled between three mountains. It has a light straw color, a delicate flavor, and an alcohol content of 10.5–12.5%. |
| Polyana Kvasova (Note: Indicated as invalid on the IP Office website) Поляна Квасова | Mineral water | 10 September 2009 | Zakarpattia Oblast | 8 | GI | The water from Poliana has a medium mineral content and a high concentration of bicarbonates and orthoboric acid, giving it medicinal properties. |
| Menska Ostrech Менська Остреч | Mineral water | 10 September 2009 | Chernihiv Oblast | 9 | AO | The water from Mena has a low mineral and a high bicarbonate and chloride content, giving it medicinal properties. Its pH is 7.45–7.65. |
| Tsarychanska Царичанська | Mineral water | 12 October 2009 | Dnipropetrovsk Oblast | 10 | AO | The water from Tsarychanka has a high concentration of bicarbonates, sodium, and chloride, giving it medicinal properties. Its pH is 7.2–8.4. |
| Truskavetska Трускавецька | Mineral water | 11 May 2010 | Lviv Oblast | 11 | AO | The water from Truskavets has a low mineral (particularly magnesium and calcium) and a high bicarbonate content, giving it medicinal properties. |
| Zbruchanska Збручанська | Mineral water | 10 February 2011 | Khmelnytskyi Oblast | 12 | AO | This water, originating from a source near the Zbruch River, has a low mineral and a high bicarbonate content, giving it medicinal properties. |
| Zolota Balka † Золота Балка | Wine, sparkling wine | 26 September 2011 | Autonomous Republic of Crimea, Sevastopol (Note: Zolota Balka and Balaklava wines are produced by the Zolota Balka Agricultural Firm, headquartered in Sevastopol proper and Balaklava. In 2023, the Verkhovna Rada merged the area around Balaklava, formerly part of Sevastopol's Balaklavskyi District, into Bakhchysarai Raion of the Autonomous Republic of Crimea. As a result, the firm's vineyards are now de jure located outside of Sevastopol's administrative boundaries.) | 13 | AO | The red, rosé, and white wines are produced near Balaklava from various locally grown grape varieties, featuring, respectively, rich fruity, light fruity, and floral aromas. The white and rosé muscatel wines also exhibit notes of rose. |
| Tavria † Таврія | Wine, brandy | 26 September 2011 | Kherson Oblast | 14 | AO | Aligoté, Rkatsiteli, and Cabernet grapes are grown near Nova Kakhovka on land once flooded by the Dnipro, giving them a distinctive aroma. Semi-dry and semi-sweet wines are stored at low temperatures, while dry wines are aged in oak barrels in cellars. The brandy is characterized by aromas of wildflowers. |
| Meganom † Меганом | Wine | 26 September 2011 | Autonomous Republic of Crimea | 15 | AO | The soil near Cape Meganom has a complex composition, in part due to its proximity to the now-extinct Karadag volcano. This area is also the hottest and driest in Crimea, and, combined with the sea breeze, it gives the locally grown grapes their distinctive characteristics. The dry red and white wines produced here contain 9–13% alcohol. |
| Balaklava † Балаклава | Wine, sparkling wine | 26 September 2011 | Autonomous Republic of Crimea, Sevastopol | 16 | AO | The still and sparkling wines, produced near Balaklava from various locally grown grapes, are distinguished by a stable acidity and a fresh aroma. |
| Magarach † Магарач | Wine | 25 July 2013 | Autonomous Republic of Crimea | 20 | AO | Grapes grown in the Magarach Tract near Vidradne are used to produce dry, semi-dry, semi-sweet red and white wines, as well as fortified, dessert, and muscatel varieties, using a wide range of winemaking methods. |
| Molochanska † Молочанська | Mineral water | 26 September 2016 | Zaporizhzhia Oblast | 3111 | AO | The water from Molochansk has a low mineral content and a complex anionic and varying cationic composition. Its pH is 7.0–8.0. |
| Hutsul sheep bryndzya Гуцульська овеча бриндзя | Cheese | 11 November 2019 | Chernivtsi, Ivano-Frankivsk, Zakarpattia oblasts | 3117 | AO | This Hutsul cheese is made in summer from at least 80% sheep's milk sourced from flocks grazing on Carpathian montane meadows at elevations of no less than 700 m (2,297 ft), with the rest being mountain cow's or goat's milk. Rennet and salt are used in the production process, resulting in a crumbly cheese with a minimum fat content of 30%. The cheese-making tradition is inscribed on the National Register of the Intangible Cultural Heritage of Ukraine. |
| Hutsul cow bryndza Гуцульська коров'яча бриндза | Cheese | 12 October 2020 | Chernivtsi, Ivano-Frankivsk, Zakarpattia oblasts | 3118 | AO | This Hutsul cheese is made from at least 70% cow's milk sourced from flocks grazing on Carpathian montane meadows at elevations of no less than 700 m (2,297 ft), with the rest being mountain sheep's or goat's milk. Rennet and salt are used in the production process, resulting in a crumbly yet homogeneous and sticky cheese with a minimum fat content of 20%. |
| Melitopol cherry † Мелітопольська черешня | Sweet cherry | 12 October 2020 | Zaporizhzhia Oblast | 3119 | AO | The chernozem soils and the accumulation of heat in spring make Melitopol and its surroundings particularly suitable for cherry cultivation. For over 90 years, the Melitopol Experimental Station of Horticulture has developed numerous early fruiting sweet cherry cultivars characterized by high sugar content and complex flavor. |
| Krolevets towels Кролевецькі рушники | Towels, tablecloths, napkins, aprons, textile panels | 26 October 2020 | Sumy Oblast | 3120 | GI | The towels (rushnyky) from Krolevets are woven on handlooms and then embroided, featuring a white background adorned with red ornaments forming floral and geometric motifs. These towels serve as important attributes in local wedding ceremonies and are also used as decorations. This cultural element is inscribed on the National Register of the Intangible Cultural Heritage of Ukraine. |
| Petrykivka painting Петриківський розпис | Souvenirs, tableware, fast-moving consumer goods | 26 October 2020 | Dnipropetrovsk Oblast | 3121 | GI | The ornamentation from Petrykivka predominantly features floral motifs and is traditionally painted on walls, decorative tableware, boxes, and paper. Paint is applied using brushes made from cat hair or plant materials. This cultural element is inscribed on the National Register and the UNESCO Representative List of the Intangible Cultural Heritage. |
| Chabag Шабаг | Wine, sparkling wine | 20 December 2023 | Odesa Oblast | 3125 | AO | Proximity to the Dniester Estuary, along with the distinctive local soil and climate conditions, makes Shabo a favorable area for grape cultivation and winemaking. The red, white, and sparkling wines are produced exclusively from locally grown grape varieties, including the native Telti-Kuruk. |
| Acha-Abag Аша-Абаг | Wine, sparkling wine | 20 December 2023 | Odesa Oblast | 3126 | GI | Proximity to the Dniester Estuary, along with the distinctive local soil and climate conditions, makes Shabo a favorable area for grape cultivation and winemaking. The red, white, rosé, sparkling, muscatel, and ice wines are made using specific recipes and methods, though not necessarily using locally grown grapes. |
| Prydunaiska Bessarabia Придунайська Бессарабія | Wine, sparkling wine | 20 December 2023 | Odesa Oblast | 3127 | GI | The proximity of numerous water bodies (lakes of Yalpuh, Kuhurlui, Cahul, Katlabuh, and Kytai, as well as the Danube and the Black Sea) moderates the local climate and makes the reflected sunlight more intense, creating favorable conditions for grape cultivation. The well-drained chernozem soil reduces grape yield but enhances the quality of the resulting dry, semi-dry, and semi-sweet red, white, and sparkling wines. |
| Yalpuh Ялпуг | Wine | 20 December 2023 | Odesa Oblast | 3128 | AO | The proximity of the vineyards to Lake Yalpuh moderates the local climate and makes the reflected sunlight more intense, creating favorable conditions for grape cultivation. The well-drained chernozem soil reduces grape yield but enhances the quality of the resulting wines. The dry red and white wines are produced entirely from locally grown grapes, specifically containing at least 85% of the local Odesa Black and Sukholymanskyi White varieties, respectively. |
| Zakarpattia / Zakarpattia wine / Zakarpatske vyno Закарпаття/Закарпатське вино | Wine | 29 May 2024 | Zakarpattia Oblast | 3129 | GI | Zakarpattia's proximity to the Carpathians results in a pronounced difference between day and night temperatures and a reduced risk of frost, while its temperate, well-ventilated climate provides favorable conditions for grape cultivation. The red, rosé, and white wines are characterized by relatively low alcohol content and high acidity. |
| Khersonsky kavun / Kherson watermelon † Херсонський кавун | Watermelon | 24 July 2024 | Kherson Oblast | 3130 | AO | The moderately moist sandy soils and relatively warm climate of left-bank Kherson Oblast produce high-quality watermelons. The heat resistance of local varieties allows for continued sugar accumulation in the fruits, yielding especially sweet (at least 12 °Bx) and dense watermelons with an elongation ratio of 1–1.2. |
| Med Zakarpattia / Zakarpattia honey / Zakarpatskyy med Мед Закарпаття/Закарпатський мед | Honey | 24 July 2024 | Zakarpattia Oblast | 3131 | GI | This honey is produced by a local breed of Carniolan bees from wildflowers that grow on the foothills and highlands of the Carpathians. The unique local climate and flora give rise to distinct types of honey, including those made of bilberries, raspberries, fireweed, and giant knotweed, as well as polyfloral and honeydew varieties. |
| Frumushika Valley Долина Фрумушика | Wine | 24 July 2024 | Odesa Oblast | 3132 | AO | The steppe terrain, little rainfall, and unique soil characteristics of the Frumushika River valley create favorable conditions for grape cultivation. The dry red, rosé, and white wines are produced entirely from the locally grown Tsytronnyi Maharacha, Rkatsiteli, Merlot, and Cabernet Sauvignon grapes. |
| Myaso baranyny Frumushika / Frumushika sheep meat М'ясо баранини Фрумушика/Баранина Фрумушика | Sheep meat | 24 July 2024 | Odesa Oblast | 3133 | GI | Sheep herding has deep roots in Bessarabia, and it disappeared from most of the region in the late 19th to early 20th centuries with the introduction of crop cultivation. However, it has survived in remote areas such as the Frumushika River valley, where local breeds of sheep (Karakul, Tsigai, and Hissar) graze on the diverse grasses of the steppe. The mutton or lamb exhibits marbling and has a sweet, grassy, and nutty flavor. |
| Frumushika steppe honey Мед степовий Фрумушика | Honey | 3 September 2025 | Odesa Oblast | 3134 | GI | The polyfloral honey is collected in late July from wildflowers of the Budjak Steppe, some of which are only endemic to this area. It is characterized by a deep yellow color with a greenish hue, a flavor resembling apples and pears, and a slight bitter aftertaste. |

== See also ==
- Geographical indications and traditional specialities in the European Union
- List of Protected Designation of Origin products by country
- Ukrainian culture during the Russian invasion of Ukraine
- Ukrainian wine
