= Gołka =

Polish smoked cheese

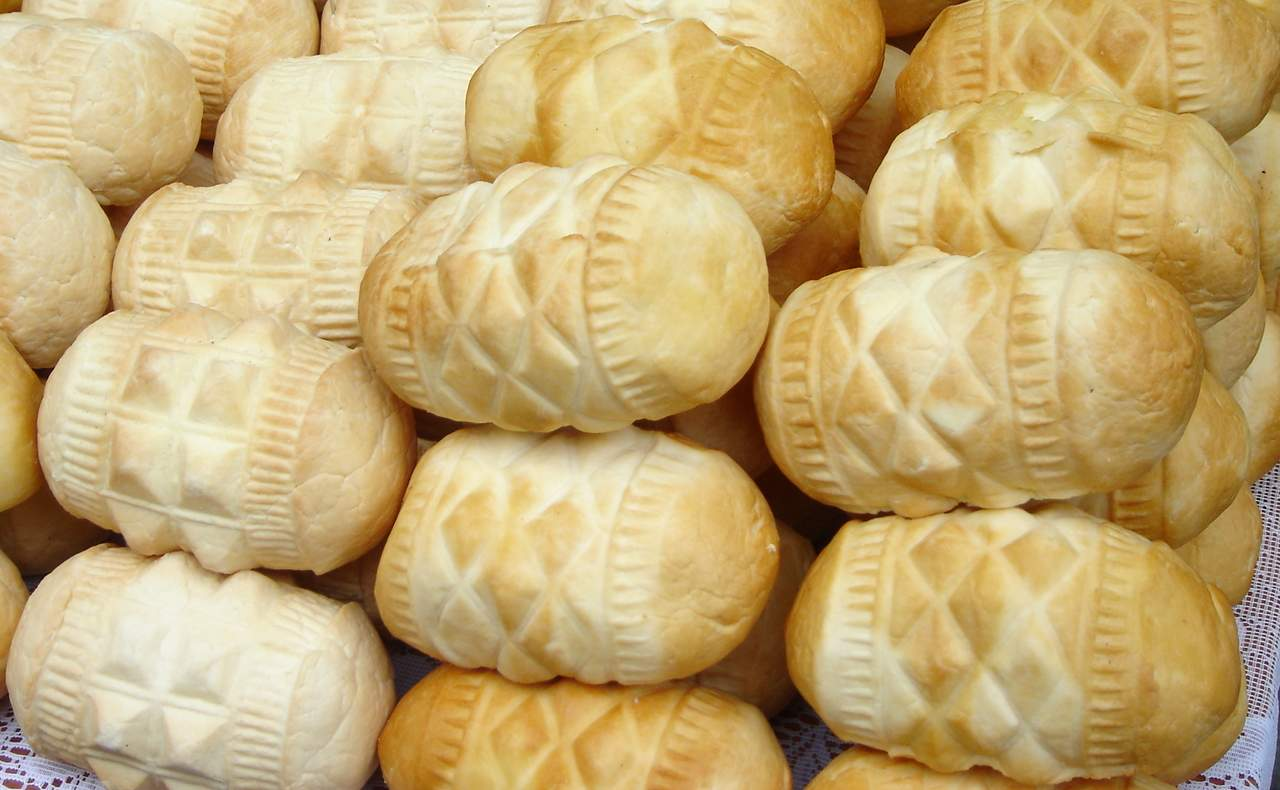
Gołka

Gołka is a type of smoked cheese originating in Poland that is similar to oscypek/oštiepok but is made exclusively from cow milk instead of sheep milk. Gołka also has a different shape; it's cylindrical, while oscypek is tapered at both ends (spindle-shaped). The cheese typically has a decorative pattern on its surface resulting from the wooden molds used to press the forms. It has a mild flavor with a slightly smoky aroma.

== See also ==
- Polish cuisine
- Oscypek
