= Oscypek =

Smoked cheese made of salted sheep milk from the Tatra Mountains of Poland

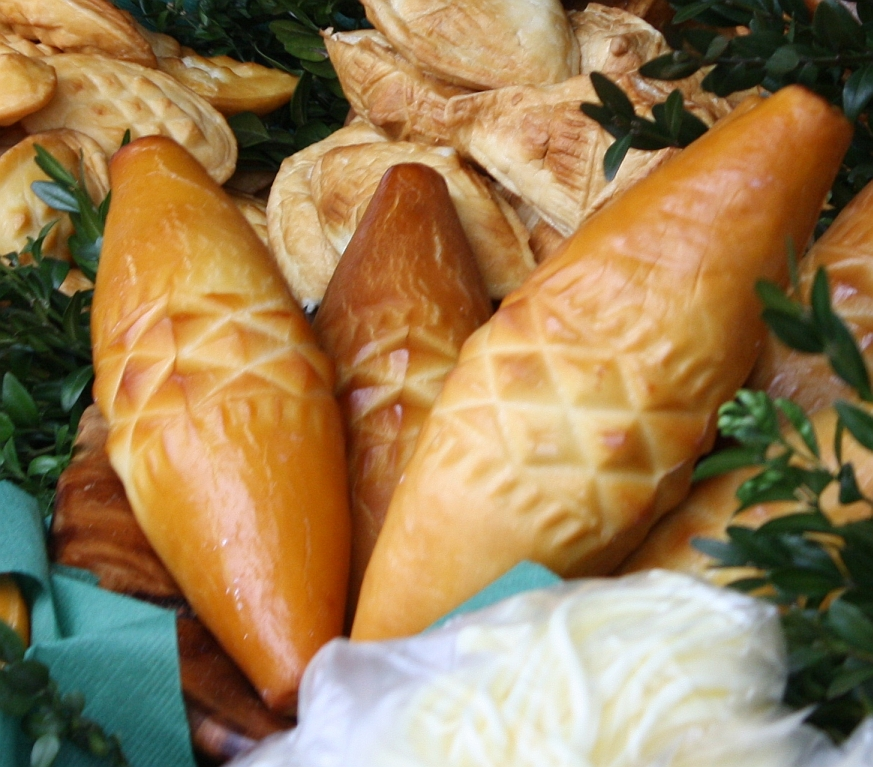
- Traditional oscypek
- Type: Smoked cheese
- Place of origin: Poland
- Region or state: Podhale
- Main ingredients: salt, sheep milk
- Variations: With cranberry jam
- Food energy (per serving): 369 kcal (1,540 kJ)

Oscypek (Polish: [ɔsˈt͡sɘpɛk], Polish plural: oscypki), rarely oszczypek, is a smoked cheese made of salted sheep milk exclusively in the Tatra Mountains region of Poland. Oscypek is made by an expert named "baca", a term also denoting a shepherd in the mountains. The cheese is a traditional holiday cheese in some European countries and is often pan-fried and served with cranberry jam (żurawina) on the side.

== Process and varieties ==
A similar cheese is made in the Slovak Tatra Mountains under the name oštiepok. The cheeses differ in the ratio of their ingredients, the cheesemaking process and the characteristics of the final product. Oscypek needs to be made from at least 60% sheep's milk according to the EU's Protected designation of origin regulations, and must weigh between 600 and 800g and measure between 17 and 23 cm. It can only be produced between late April to early October, when the sheep used is fed on fresh mountain grass.

Oscypek is made using salted sheep's milk, with the addition of cows' or goats' milk strictly regulated by the protected recipe. Unpasteurized salted sheep's milk is first turned into cottage cheese, which is then repeatedly rinsed with boiling water and squeezed. After this, the mass is pressed into wooden, spindle-shaped forms in decorative shapes. The forms are then placed in a brine-filled barrel for a night or two, after which they are placed close to the roof in a special wooden hut and cured in hot smoke for up to 14 days.

== History ==
The first mention of cheese production in the Tatra Mountains dates back to the 15th century, in a document from the village of Ochotnica in 1416. The first recorded recipe for Oscypek was issued in 1748 in the Żywiec area. There is also a smaller form called redykołka, known as the 'younger sister' of oscypek.

Since 14 February 2008 Oscypek has been registered under the European Union Protected Designation of Origin (PDO).

Oscypek (protected geographical indication) may be produced only in the Nowy Targ and Tatra counties, as well as in parts of the Cieszyn, Limanowa, Nowy Sącz, Sucha Beskidzka and Żywiec counties in southern Poland.

== See also ==
- Bundz – Sheep milk cheese – Polish sheep's milk cheese
- Gołka – Polish smoked cheese – Polish cheese similar to oscypek, but made with milk from cattle
- List of cheeses
- List of Polish cheeses
- List of smoked foods
- List of stretch-curd cheeses – Cheeses prepared using the pasta filata technique
- Polish cuisine – Culinary traditions of Poland
- Redykołka – Type of traditional Polish cheese – The "younger sister" of oscypek
