= Banosh =

Ukrainian type of cornmeal stew

Banush
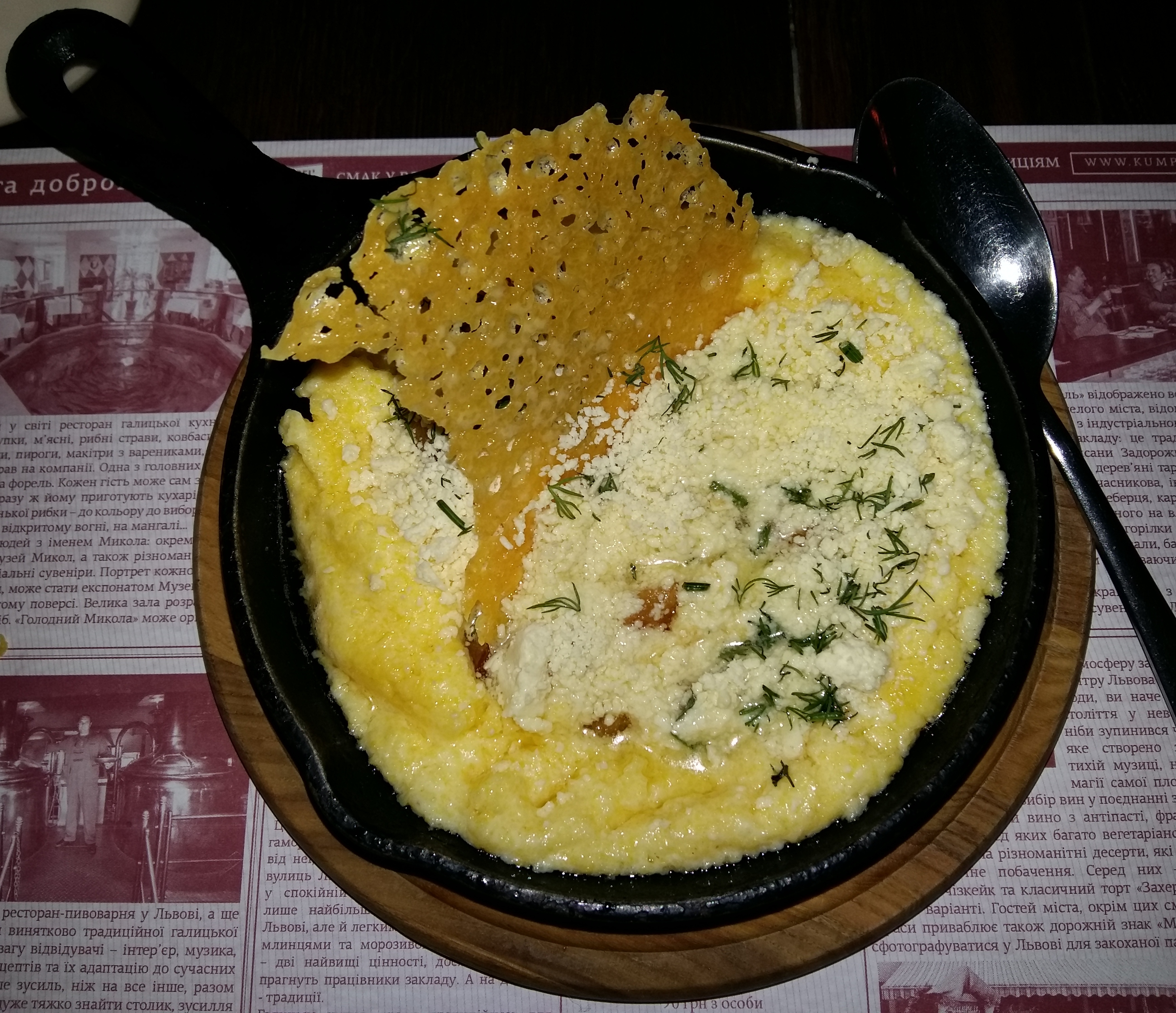
- Banush in Lviv
- Type: Porridge
- Place of origin: Ukraine
- Serving temperature: Hot
- Main ingredients: Cornmeal and smetana

Banush or banosh (Ukrainian: бануш, банош; Polish: banusz; Romanian: bălmuș) is a Ukrainian dish prepared from cornmeal with added smetana (sour cream), topped with pork rind, mushrooms, and bryndza. The dish is considered to be a part of Ukrainian cuisine, in particularly Hutsul. It is commonly served in Ukrainian restaurants as well as available in Ukrainian supermarkets, but it is especially popular in the Carpathian region in West Ukraine and Romania.

== See also ==
- Polenta
- Mămăligă
- List of maize dishes
- Ukrainian cuisine
