= Brânză de burduf =

Romanian cheese

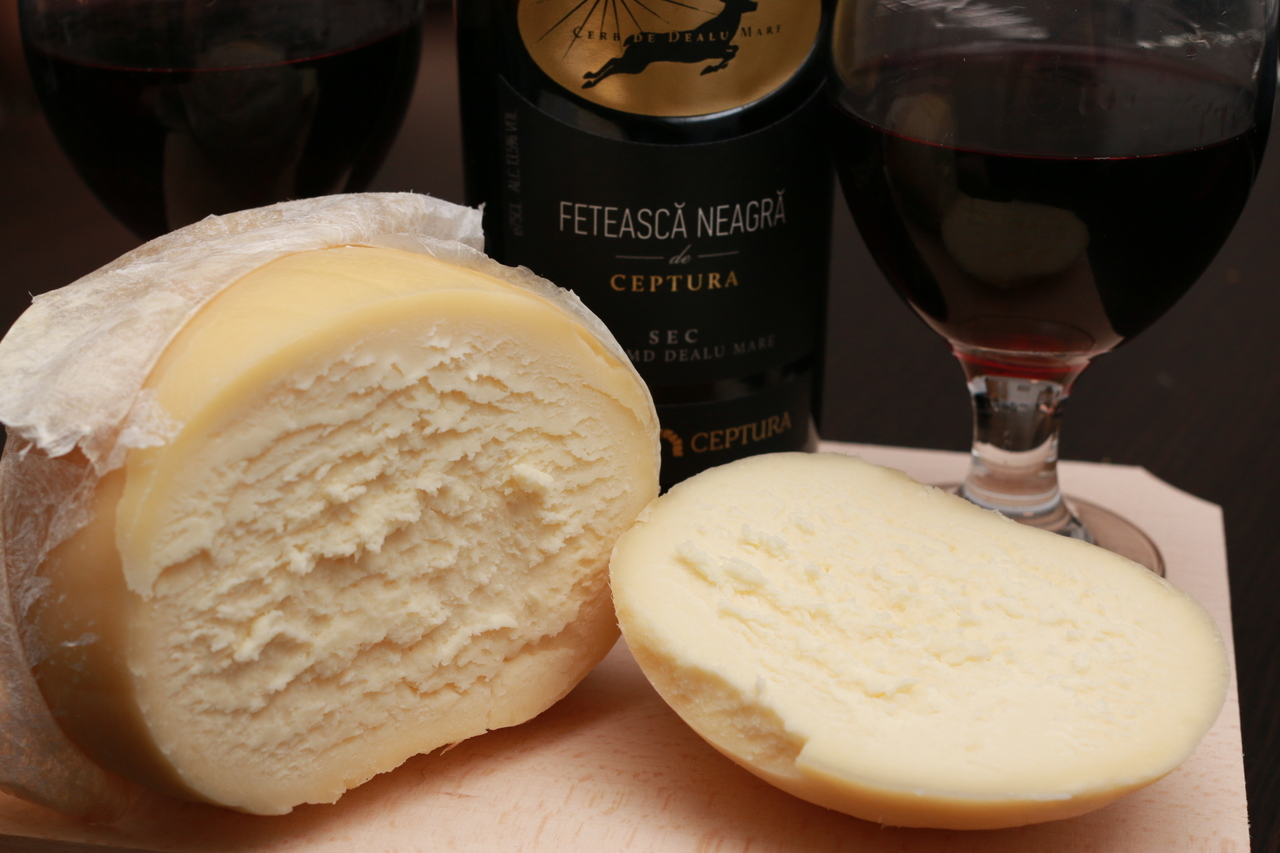
- Country of origin: Romania
- Region: Romanian Carpathians
- Town: Fundata
- Source of milk: Sheep, Buffalo
- Pasteurised: Traditionally, no
- Texture: Soft

Brânză de burduf (also known as "brânză frământată" (English: kneaded cheese)) is a salty type of Romanian cheese, made with sheep (or occasionally buffalo) milk. It has a strong flavour and is slightly soft in texture.

== Processing ==
To obtain it, sweet maturated caş (an Emmental-like cheese known as "caş dospit") is cut into small pieces, salted and then hand-mixed in a large wooden bowl. The mixture is then placed in a sheep's stomach, or into a sheep's skin that has been carefully cleaned and sawed on the edges, or in a tube made of pine bark (giving it a slight piney bitter taste). The cheese can be consumed even if kept for a long time in a sheep's stomach or in a sheep's skin. If kept in pine bark, the cheese gets a specific pine resin flavour.

The cheese is specific to different areas from the historical regions of Transylvania, Moldavia and Wallachia (including assortments known as: "Brânză în coajă de brad" (Cheese in fir shell, famous in the traditional cheese region of Rucăr). A softer, more fatty variant of it is known as "Brânză de putină", "Cremă Focșani", "Brânză Moldova", "Brânză Dorna" (commonly found in supermarkets), "Brânză Luduș", "Brânză Bistrița", "Brânză Săveni" or "Brânză Botoșana".

== Regions where it is traditionally found ==
-Rucăr area of Rucăr–Bran Pass

-Sibiu County

== See also ==
- Brânză
- List of cheeses
