= Halušky =

Eastern European dumpling or noodle dish

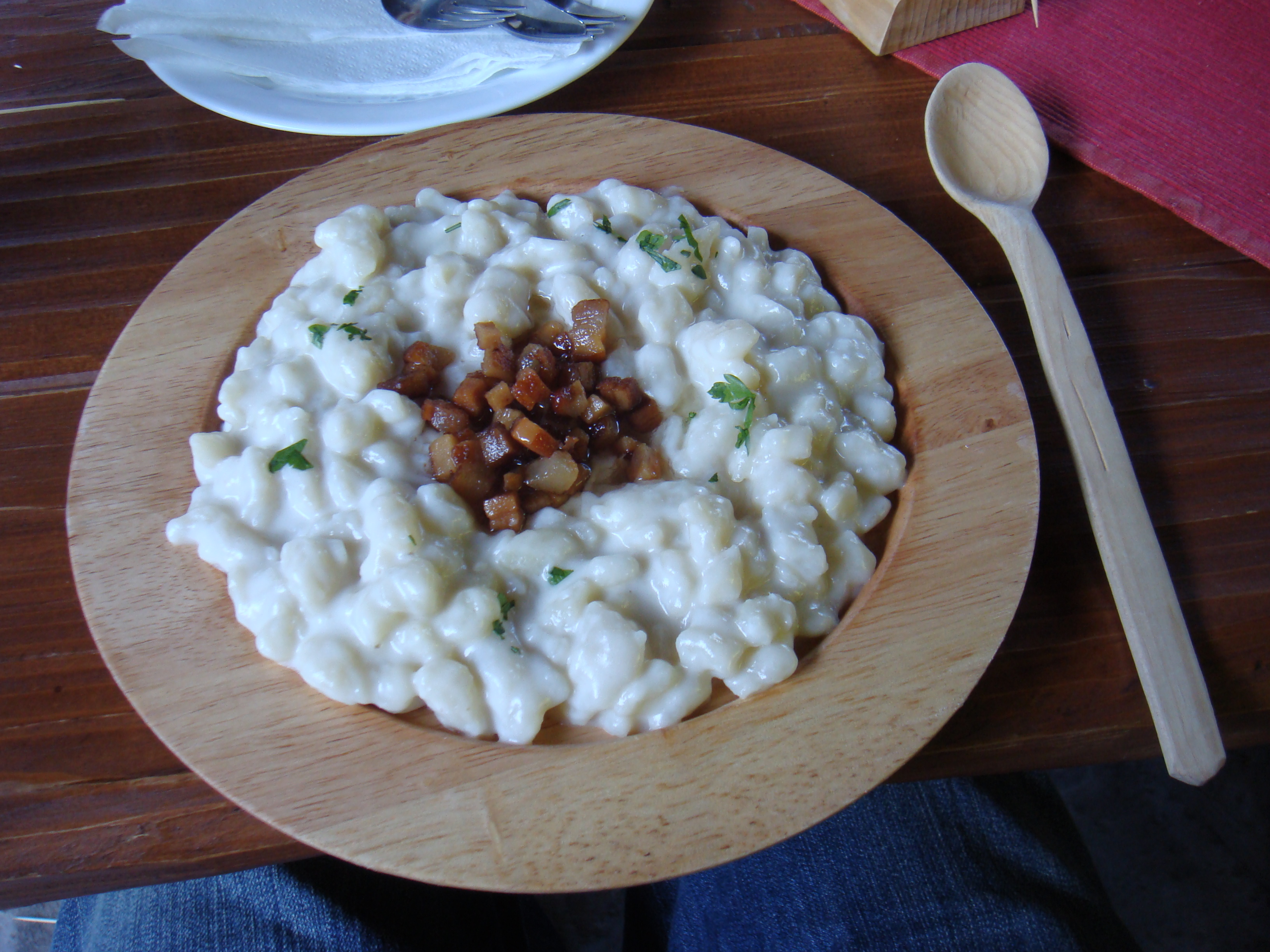
- Bryndzové Halušky with bacon
- Type: Dumpling or noodle, gnocchi
- Region or state: Eastern Europe and Central Europe
- Main ingredients: Batter (flour, potatoes, cottage cheese, bryndza cheese)
- Variations: Bryndzové halušky, Kapustové halušky, strapačky, noodles & cabbage

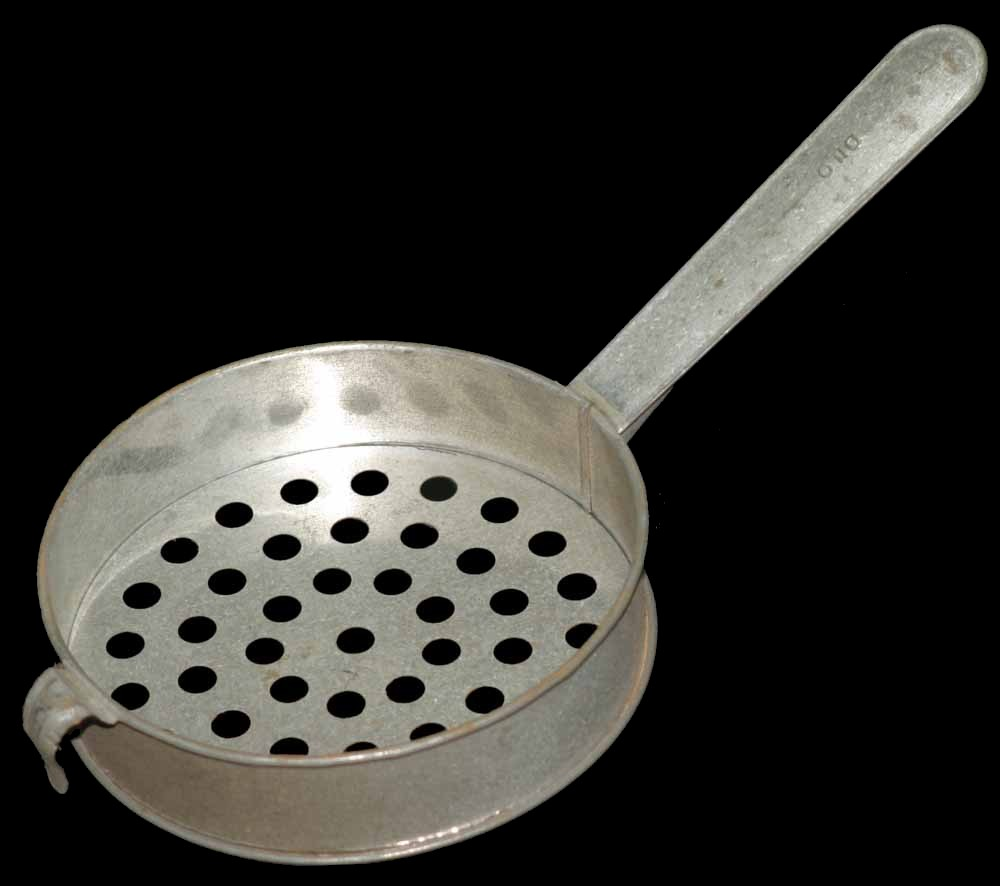
Haluškár strainer

Halušky (Note: IPA: [ɦaluʃkɪ], plural in Czech and Slovak; Russian: галушка; Hungarian: galuska [ˈɡɒluʃkɒ]; Ukrainian: галушка, romanized: halushka [ɦɐˈluʃkɐ], plural halushky [ɦɐlʊʃˈkɪ]; Lithuanian: virtinukai; Turkish: holuşka.) is a traditional variety of thick, soft noodles or dumplings found in many Central and Eastern European cuisines under various local names.

== Varieties ==
The term halušky can refer to the dumplings themselves, or to a complete dish containing other ingredients. Typically the dish described is noodles with sauteed cabbage and onions. Bryndzové halušky, which combines the noodles with a soft sheep's cheese, is one of the national dishes of Slovakia. In Hungary it is eaten with cheese, sour cream, cottage cheese, egg custard, semolina and butter all throughout the country, while in Slovakia it is eaten with sheep's cheese and bacon or spinach.

In certain regions of the Antalya Province in South Turkey, holuşka is made with larger dumplings than its counterparts in Central and Eastern Europe.

Large halushky made from soft dough with optional filling are a stereotypical dish of Poltava region in Ukraine. Historically, Poltava halushky would be made from buckwheat flour and boiled in a broth known as shcherba. A related Ukrainian dish known as tovchenyky includes halushky dough boiled or stewed with fish or meat.

== Related terms ==
A haluskar is a kitchen utensil used to drop batter into stock to create the noodles.

== See also ==
- Arany galuska
- Gnocchi
- Kluski, a Polish dumpling
- Passatelli
- Spätzle
- Strapačky
