= Ukrainian Institute of Intellectual Property =

Ukrainian Patent Office

The State Enterprise "Ukrainian Institute of Intellectual Property" or Ukrainian Patent Office (Ukrpatent or SE "UIPV") was created under the order of the Ministry of the Science and Education of Ukraine on July 7, 2000. Ukrpatent was the only institution in Ukraine authorized to deal with intellectual property (IP) matters (patents, trademarks, industrial designs, utility models, geographical indications, etc.) until the Ukrainian National Office for Intellectual Property and Innovations took over these functions on 8 November 2022.

== Main activities ==
- To receive the applications for the granting the title of protection;
- Conduction of the examination with conformity to the legal protection requirements;
- State registration of the industrial property objects, change of the legal status and official publication of the correspondent information;
- Participation in the improvement of the IP legislation of Ukraine;
- Formation of the national patent documentation fund.
