= Hauskyjza =

Polish cheese dish

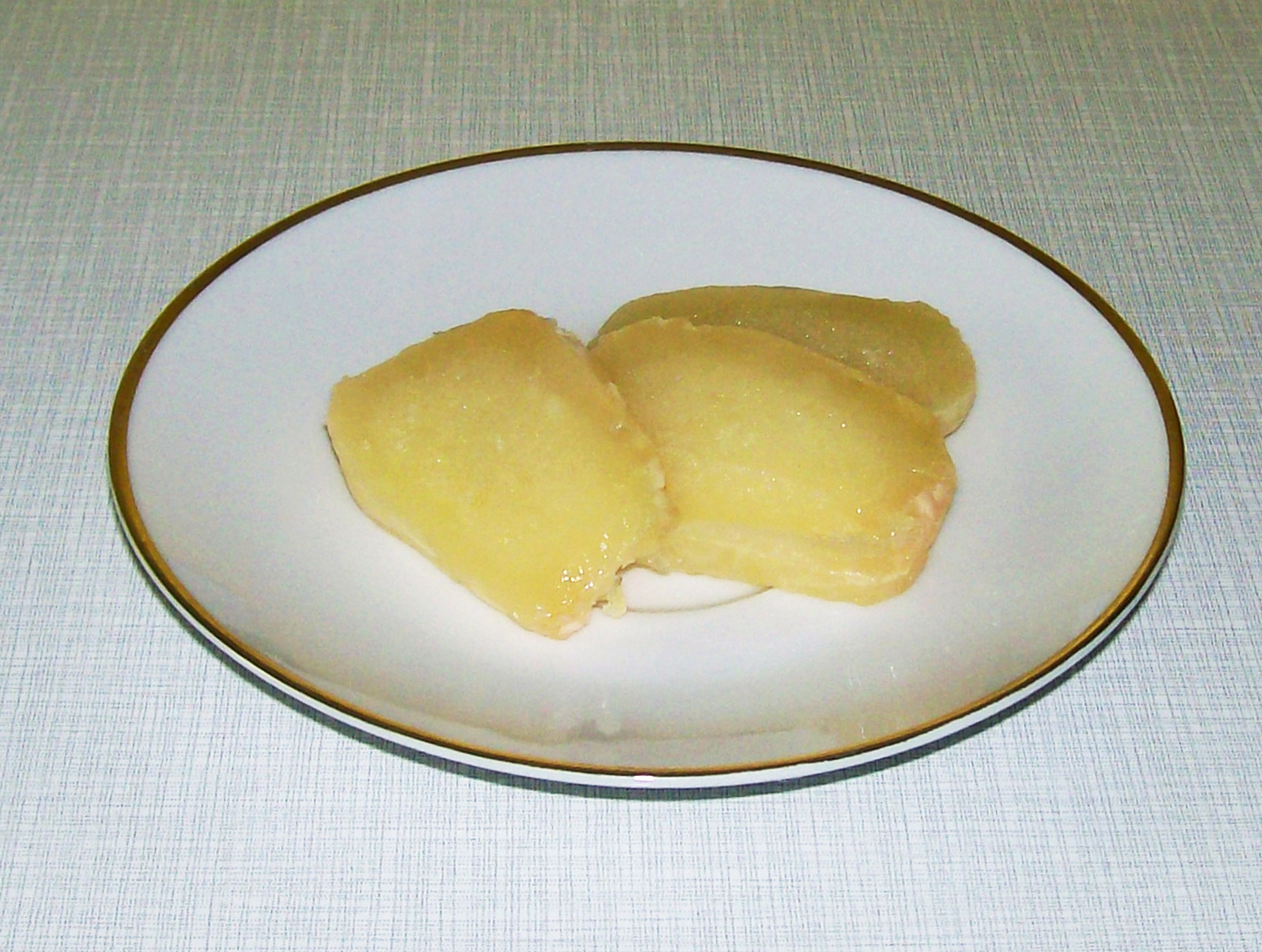
- Alternative names: Ser smażony or ser Zgliwiały
- Place of origin: Poland
- Region or state: Greater Poland, Silesia
- Main ingredients: Cottage cheese, carum
- Variations: Cancoillotte

Hauskyjza (Silesian: home cheese from the German Hauskäse) is a foodstuff made of cottage cheese, caraway and other ingredients, which are mixed, put aside for a few days to acquire the characteristic sharp flavor, scent and tacky consistency, and then warmed and fried. Often baking soda is used to condition the cottage cheese. Hauskyjza or Ser Smazony (fried cheese) or Ser Zgliwiały (rotted cheese) is a traditional product in the regions of Greater Poland, Pomerania, Kuyavia, Subcarpathia and Silesia. Before refrigerators were widely available, it was valued because of its high fastness.

Hauskyjza has an exceptionally strong scent and flavor, pleasurable to many aficionados, but found offensive by some people. (In numerous Silesian jokes, the flavor is compared to that of long-unwashed socks.) Most traditionally, it is served with dark bread and caraway or with "music," chopped onions soaked in vinegar and oil. Some people prefer it freshly made as a type of fondue.

Hauskyjza has been traditionally made at home, hence the name. Currently, it is also produced commercially.

In 2005, it was registered on a List of Traditional Products (pol. Lista Produktów Tradycyjnych) of Ministry of Agriculture and Rural Development as Ser domowy smażony z kminkiem, z czosnkiem, bez przypraw (home-made fried cheese with carum, with garlic, without spices).
