= Caș =

Semi-soft cheese produced in Romania

Caș (Romanian pronunciation: [kaʃ]) is a type of semi-soft white fresh cheese produced in Romania. It is made by curdling sheep or cow milk with rennet, and draining the whey. The resulting cheese is unsalted or lightly salted. If stored in brine, caș turns into telemea after 2–3 weeks.

Caș cheese is also used to make other types of cheese such as brânză de burduf and cașcaval.
