= Žinčica =

Slavic sheep milk whey drink

Žinčica (in Slovak), Žinčice (in Czech), Żętyca (in Polish), Жентиця (Žentyća) (in Ukrainian), or Zyntyca (in Goralic), Jintiță (Romanian language) is a drink made of sheep milk whey similar to kefir consumed mostly in Slovakia and Poland. It is a by-product in the process of making bryndza cheese.

Žinčica is fermented by the following Lactic acid bacteria: Lactobacillus casei, Lactobacillus plantarum, Lactococcus lactis and Leuconostoc mesenteroides.

Traditionally, this drink is served in a črpák, a wooden cup with a pastoral scene carved into the handle.

Bryndzové halušky is typically served with žinčica.

The origin of the word is the Romanian jintiță, the drink being carried by Vlach shepherds instead of water.

== See also ==
- Bryndza
