= Bundz =

Sheep milk cheese

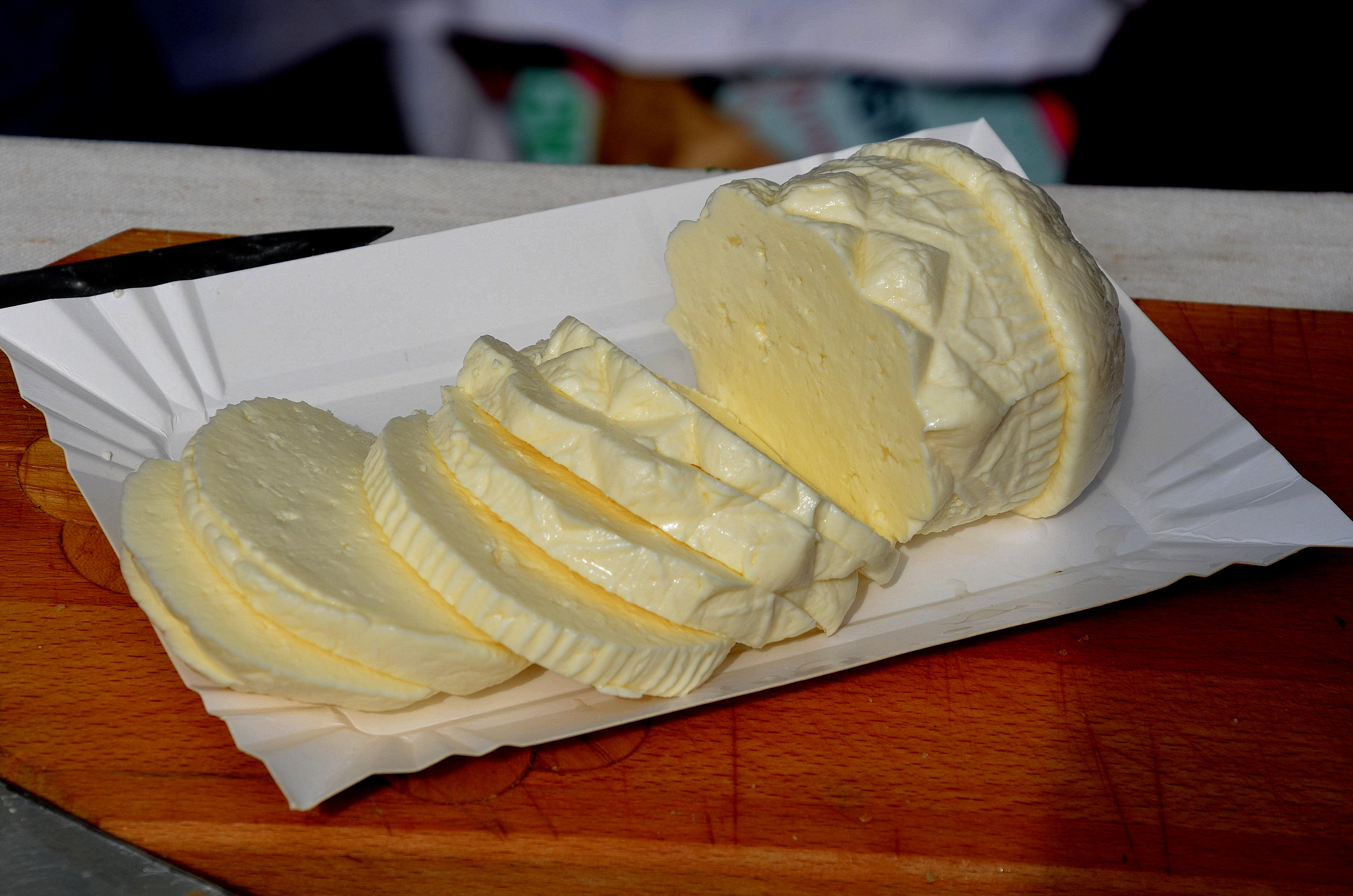

Bundz (Polish: bundz) or budz (Ukrainian: будз), also known as bunc in the Podhale dialect, is a cheese traditionally produced in the Carpathian region of Poland and Ukraine.

The first phase of bundz production follows the same process as that of oscypek. The milk poured into the "putara" is hagged, which means that the protein is truncated by enzymes contained in rennet, extracted from the stomachs of young calves. The resulting cheese curd is then brewed for a few minutes at a temperature of about 70 °C. The cheese is strained on the canvas in the form of large lumps. A mild cheese is obtained.

The drink żętyca is also made from the whey produced during bundz production.

== See also ==
- Bryndza Podhalańska, a Polish variety of soft cheese made from sheep milk.
- Oscypek, a smoked hard cheese, made in Poland from salted sheep milk
