= Smoked cheese =

Cheeses treated with smoke curing

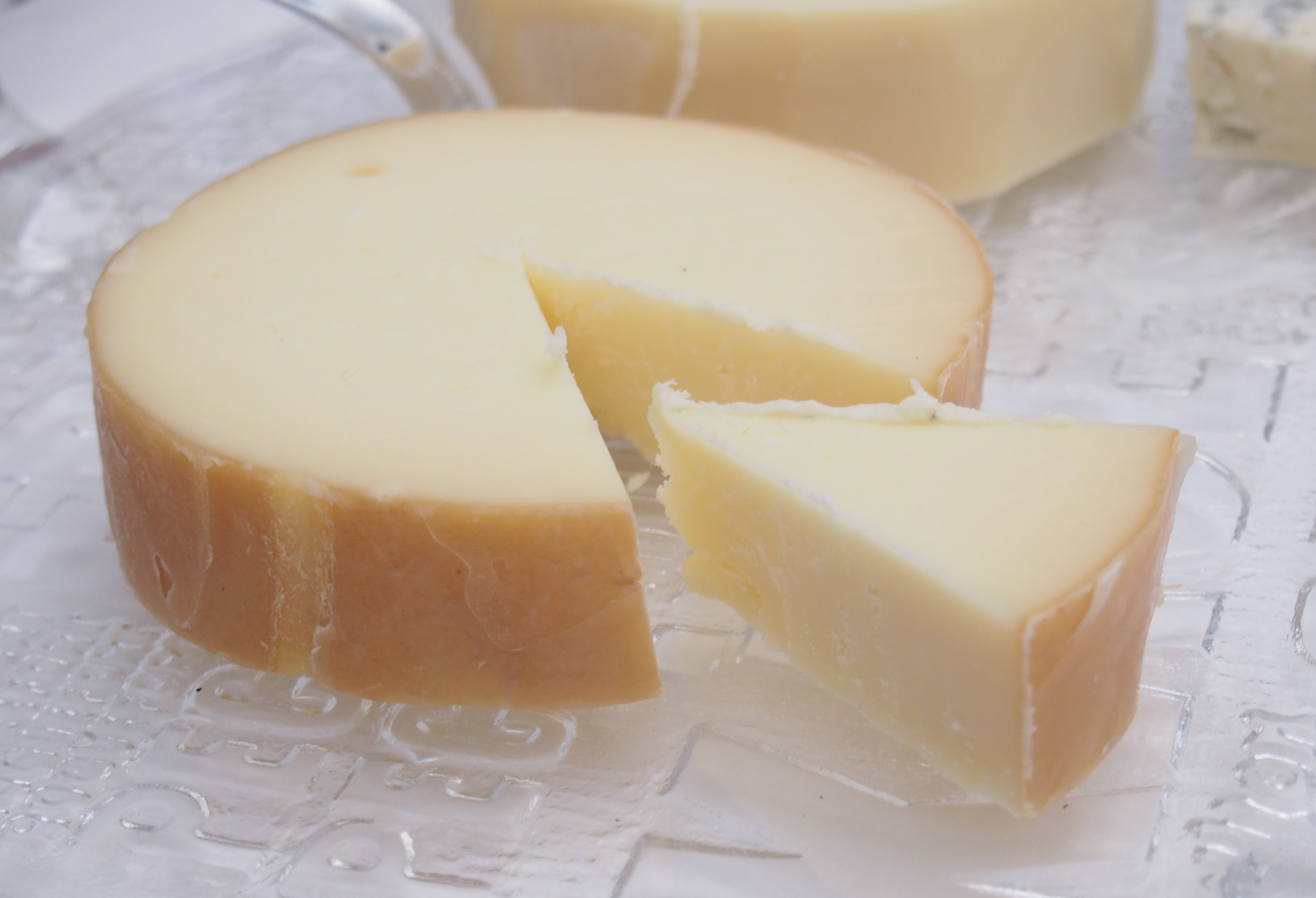
Smoked Metsovone cheese from Epirus, Greece

Smoked cheese is any cheese that has been specially treated by smoke-curing. It typically has a yellowish-brown outer pellicle which is a result of this curing process.

== Process ==
Smoke-curing is typically done in one of two ways: cold-smoking and hot-smoking. The cold-smoking method (which can take up to a month, depending on the food) smokes the food at between 20° and 30° C (68° and 86° F). Hot-smoking partially or completely cooks the food by treating it at temperatures ranging from 40° to 90 °C (104° to 194° F).

Another method, typically used in less expensive cheeses, is to use artificial smoke flavoring to give the cheese a smoky flavoring and food coloring to give the outside the appearance of having been smoked in the more traditional manner.

== Common smoked cheeses ==
Some smoked cheeses commonly produced and sold include smoked Gruyère, smoked Gouda (rookkaas), Provolone, Rauchkäse, Scamorza, Sulguni, Oscypek, Fynsk rygeost, and smoked Cheddar.

== Gallery ==
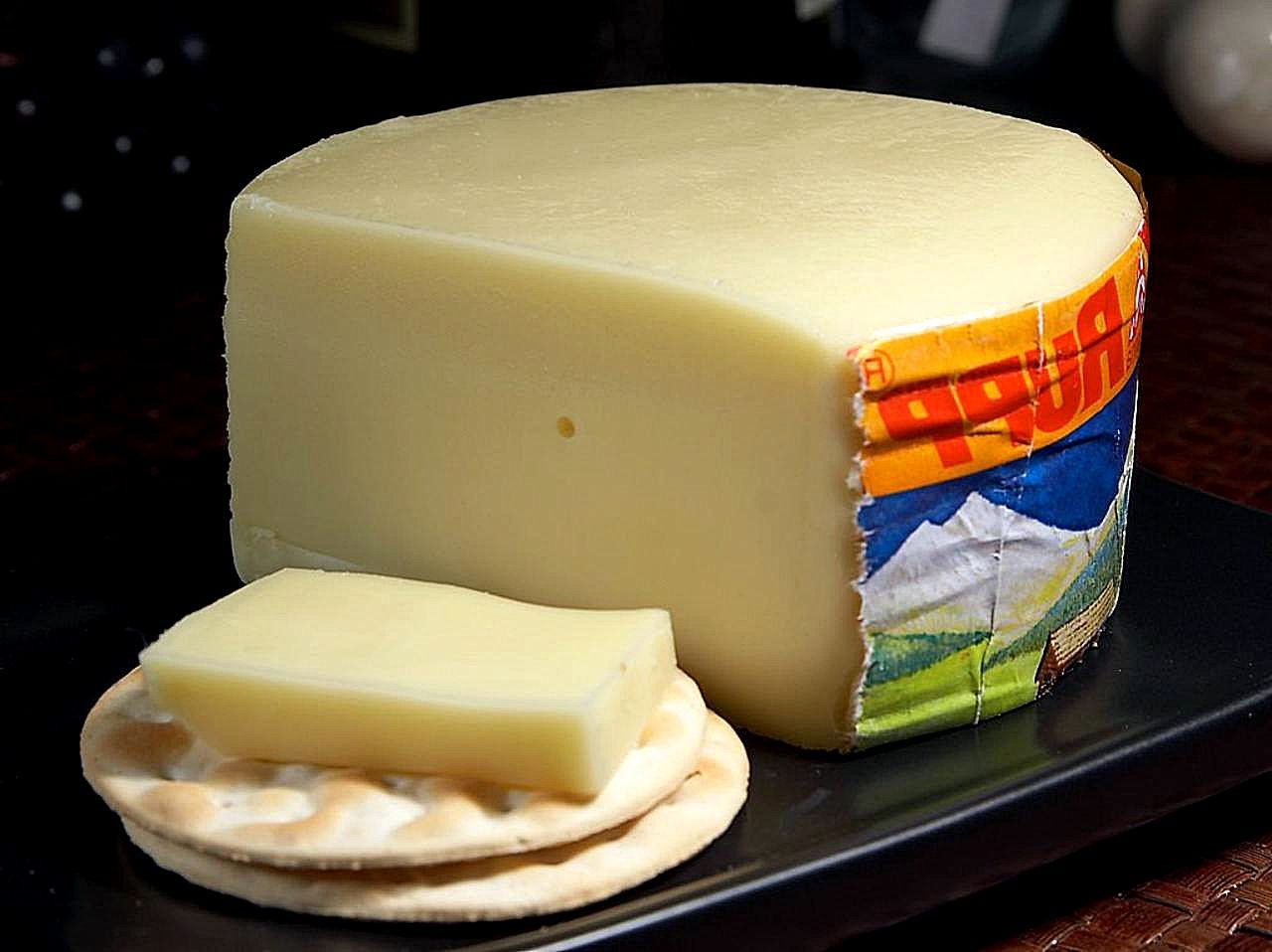
Smoked Austrian cheese

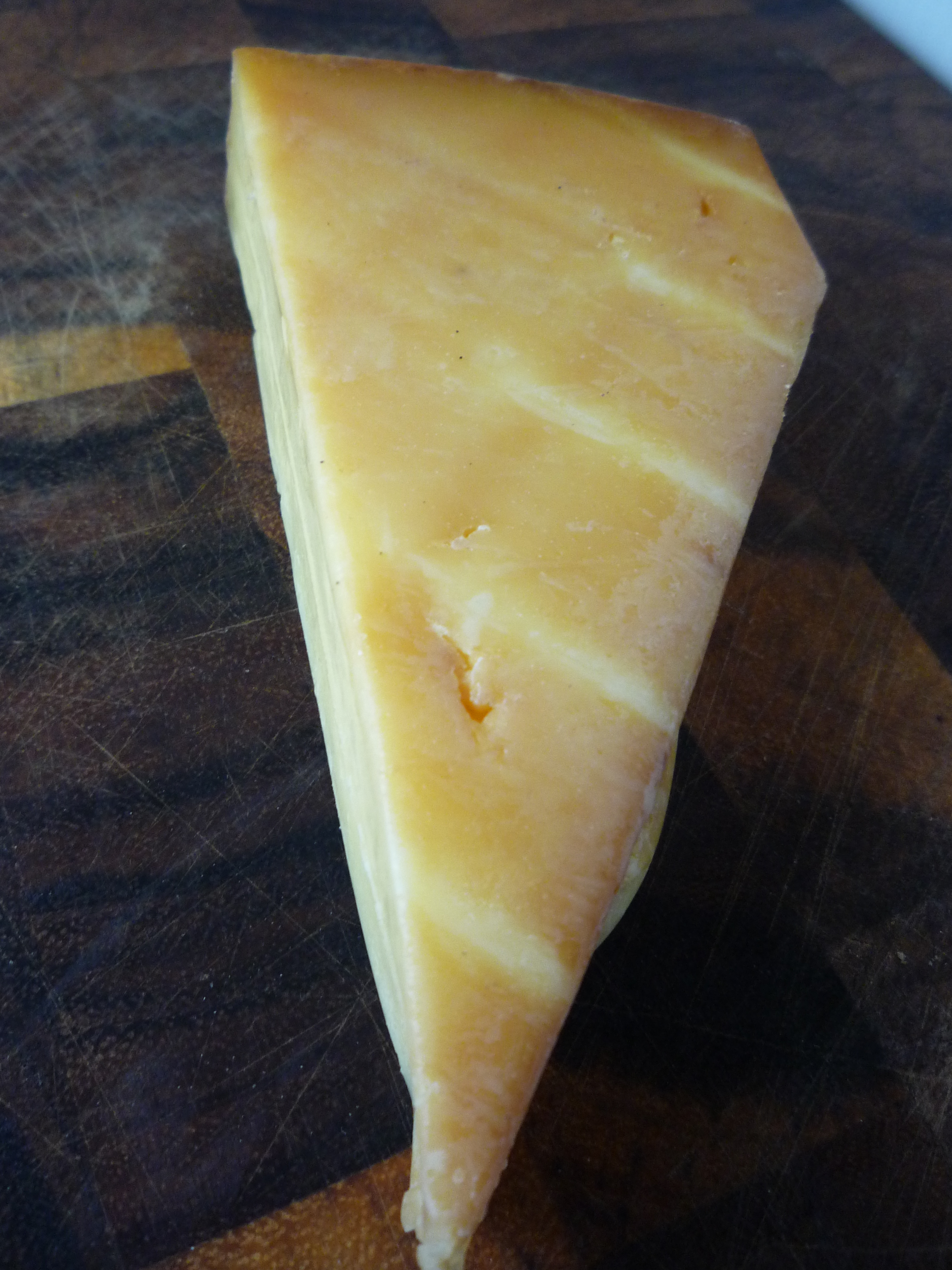
Smoked Lincolnshire Poacher Cheese

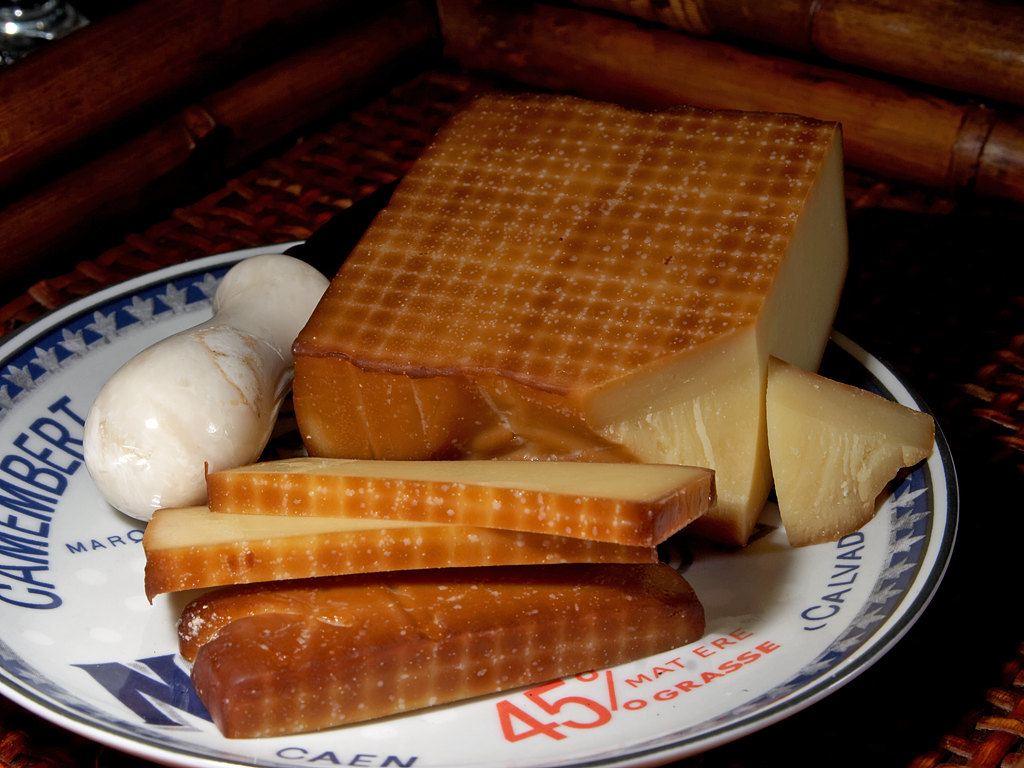
Smoked Gruyère cheese

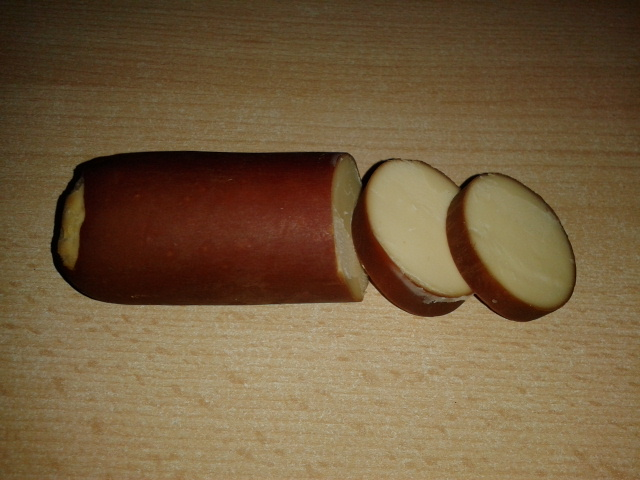
Smoked cheese in the Netherlands

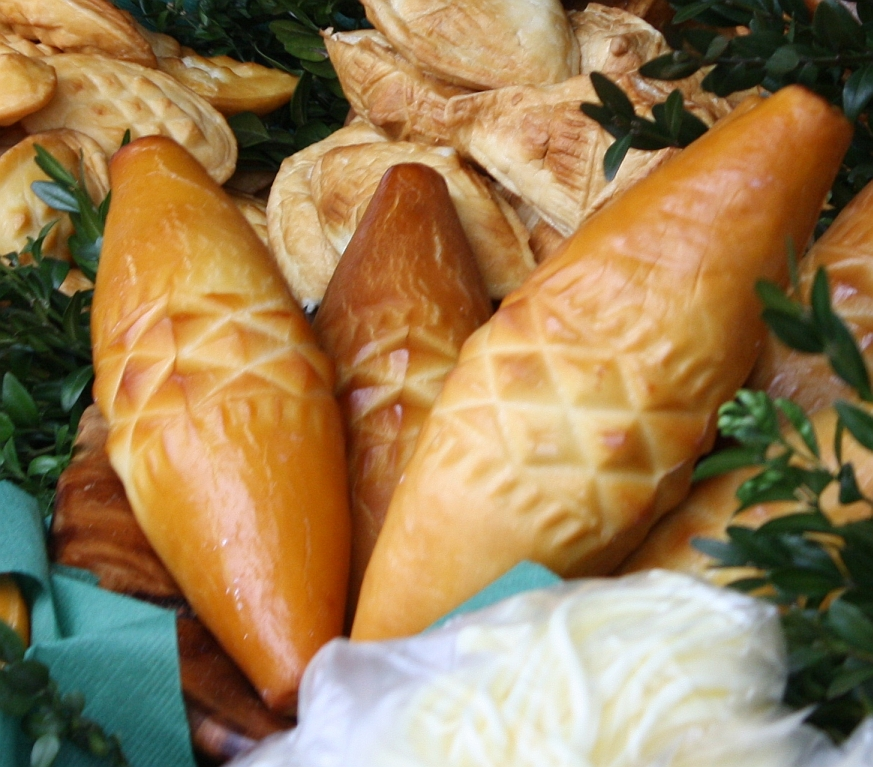
Smoked Polish oscypek

== See also ==
- List of smoked foods
