= Bryndza =

Sheep milk cheese made in several European countries

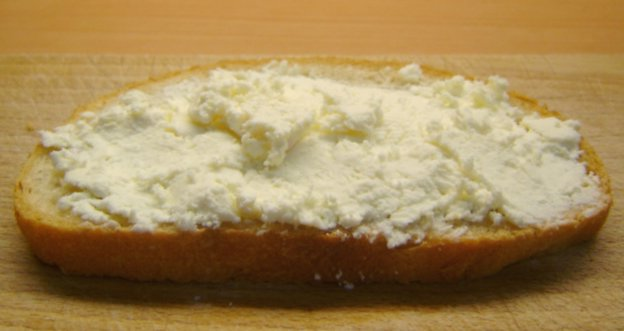
- Region: Central and Eastern Europe
- Source of milk: Sheep, goat, cow
- Pasteurised: No
- Texture: Depends on variety
- Fat content: Depends on variety
- Certification: Bryndza Podhalańska: PDO; Hutsul sheep bryndzia Slovenská bryndza: PGI

Bryndza or brynza is a sheep milk cheese made across the countries in Central and Eastern Europe, most notably in Slovakia and Poland. Bryndza cheese is creamy white in appearance, known for its characteristic strong smell and taste. The cheese is white, tangy, crumbly and slightly moist. It has characteristic odor and flavor with a notable taste of butyric acid. The overall flavor sensation begins slightly mild, then goes strong and finally fades to a salty finish. Recipes differ slightly across countries.

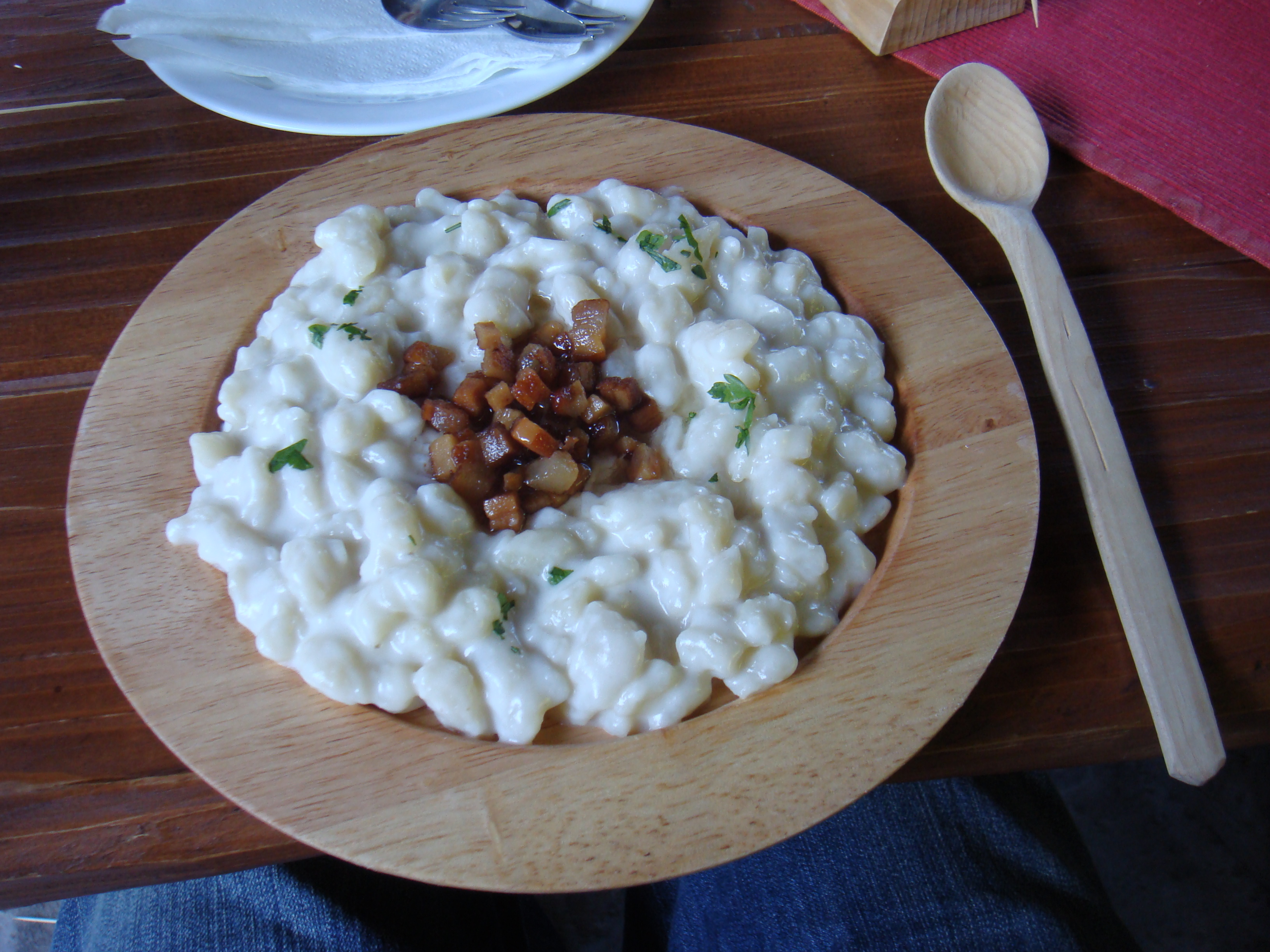
In Slovakia, bryndza serves as the main ingredient to bryndzové halušky, which is regarded as a national dish.

Bryndza is an essential ingredient in preparing traditional Slovak dishes such as podplamenníky s bryndzou or bryndzové halušky.

A byproduct of the production of bryndza is Žinčica.

== Etymology ==
Bryndza or Brynza, a word borrowed from Romanian brânză ("cheese"), is used in various European countries, due to its introduction by migrating Vlachs. The word brânză (Romanian pronunciation: [ˈbrɨnzə]) is simply the generic word for "cheese" in Romanian.

According to the Romanian Explanatory Dictionary the etymology of ”brânză” is unknown. It is a word presumably inherited by the Romanian language from Dacian, the language of the pre-Roman population in modern-day Romania. Other theories suggest, on the basis of what is used to make cheese, a derivation from Latin brandeum (originally meaning a linen covering, later a thin cloth for relic storage). Alternatively, it is possibly related to Albanian brëndës (“intestines”). Originally it referred to cheeses prepared in a sheep's stomach by reacting with the rennet inside. Outside Slovakia, Romania, Ukraine and the flanking regions of southern Poland, it is still popular nowadays in the Czech Republic under the Czech spelling "brynza".

Other regional names for the product include juhtúró in Hungarian, брынза in Russian, brenca in Serbian, Brimsen in German, бриндза and бриндзя in Ukrainian and ברינזע in Yiddish.

== History ==
The word was first recorded as brençe, described as "Vlach cheese", in the Croatian port of Dubrovnik in 1370. Bryndza was first recorded in the Slovak counties of Hungary in 1470 and in the adjacent Polish region of Podhale in 1527. In Slovakia, bryndza is regarded as a typically Slovak product and it is one of the main ingredients in the national dish bryndzové halušky. The modern version of the soft spreadable bryndza is believed to have been developed by entrepreneurs from Stará Turá (Western Slovakia) toward the end of the 18th century. They founded bryndza manufactures in mountainous regions of Central and Northern Slovakia, where local sheep cheese manufacturing had deep roots. They traded bryndza and popularized it all around the Austrian Habsburg monarchy. In Austria, it was called Liptauer, after the northern Slovak Liptov region. The Viennese speciality Liptauer, a savoury cheese-based spread, has replaced bryndza with common cows' milk cottage cheese because the original Slovak bryndza disappeared from Austrian market after the Dissolution of Austria-Hungary.

== Geographical indications ==
- Slovak bryndza from Slovakia was registered in the EU's Register of protected designations of origin and protected geographical indications on 16 July 2008 as a Protected Geographical Indication (PGI). The geographical indication was requested on 4 October 2007. Slovak bryndza must contain at least 50% of sheep milk. Sheep (ovčia) bryndza contains 100% sheep cheese.
- Bryndza Podhalańska from Poland has been registered in the EU's Register of protected designations of origin and protected geographical indications on 11 June 2007 as a Protected Designation of Origin (PDO). The geographical indication was requested on 23 September 2006.

== See also ==
- Brânză de burduf from Romania, made from caș
- Hutsul bryndza
- Austrian Liptauer
- Bulgarian sirene
- Greek feta
- Italian ricotta
- Mexican queso fresco
- Hutsul sheep bryndza
- List of cheeses
