= Salted lamb =

Salted lamb may refer to:

- Pastrmajlija
- Salt marsh lamb the meat of sheep grazed on salt marshes in coastal estuaries where they feed on salt-tolerant grasses and herbs
- Agneau de pré-salé, Salt marsh lamb from France
- In Iceland a salted lamb and pea soup is traditional
