= Banitsa =

Southeastern European pie

Banitsa баница
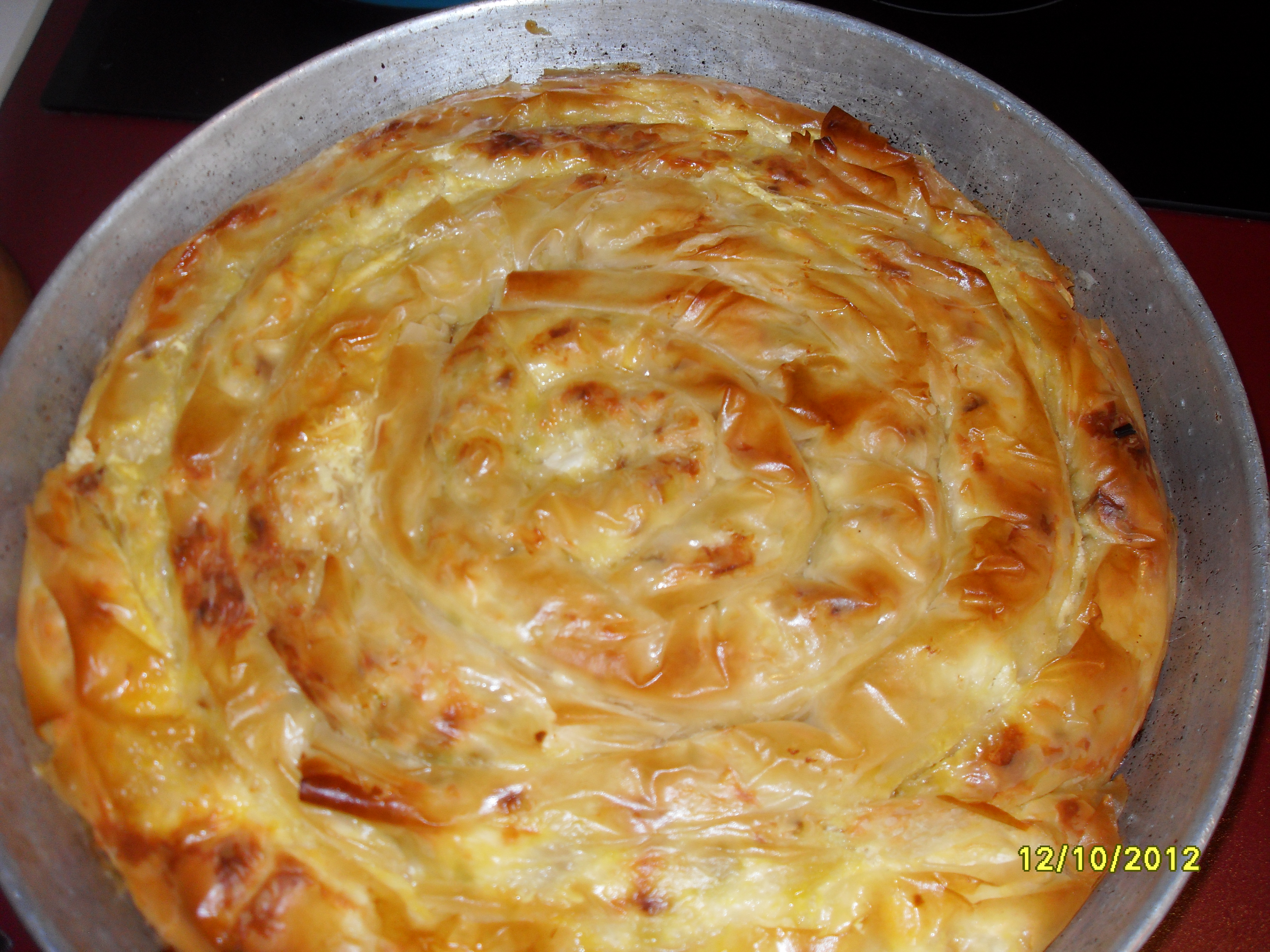
- Banitsa
- Alternative names: Banica, banitza
- Type: Pie
- Place of origin: Bulgaria
- Serving temperature: Hot or cold
- Main ingredients: Dough: flour, eggs, water Filling: crushed white cheese (sirene), yogurt, eggs

Banitsa (Bulgarian: баница), also transliterated as banica and banitza, is a traditional pie made in Bulgaria. It is also made in Budjak, where it is known as milina by Ukrainian Bulgarians; North Macedonia; and southeastern Serbia. In southeastern Serbia, it may also be known as gibanica. Banitsa is prepared by layering a mixture of whisked eggs, plain yogurt, and pieces of white brined cheese between filo pastry and then baking it in an oven.

Traditionally in Bulgaria, lucky charms are put into the pie on certain occasions, particularly on New Year's Eve. These charms may be coins or small symbolic objects (e.g., a small piece of a dogwood branch with a bud, symbolizing health or longevity). More recently, people have started writing happy wishes on small pieces of paper and wrapping them in tin foil. Wishes may include happiness, health, or success throughout the new year (similar to fortune cookies).

Banitsa is served for breakfast with plain yogurt, ayran, or boza; it can be eaten hot or cold. Some varieties include spinach—"спаначник" (spanachnik)—or a sweet version, with milk—"млечна баница" (mlechna banitsa)—or pumpkin—"тиквеник" (tikvenik).

== Etymology ==
The word "баница" derives from the South Slavic "гъбнѫти", meaning "to fold". It developed from the Proto-Slavic form *гыбаница > *гъбаница > *гбаница > баница.

== Recipes ==
=== Dough ===
Traditionally, banitsa is made with homemade or commercially made pastry sheets that are prepared from a baker's hard dough made of flour, water, and salt. At home, the sheets can be spread by continuously pulling the dough with one's fingers until it becomes less than a millimeter thin, or by using a rolling pin in several stages, with sunflower oil sprinkled between the partially spread leaves, or by a difficult technique consisting of waving movements of the entire sheet over the head, which resembles pizza-making techniques. Commercially available sheets are mechanically spread and somewhat dried before packing.

Another sort of banitsa is called tutmanik (тутманик) or poparnik (попарник) and is made with leavened sheets. The usual filling is cheese.

=== Filling ===
Traditional banitsa filling is made of crushed white cheese (sirene, feta cheese), yogurt, and eggs. Sometimes, baking soda is added to the yogurt, which makes it rise (as the baking soda reacts with the acid in yogurt). The addition of baking soda results in a fluffier filling.

Vegetable fillings include spinach, sorrel, dock, mangold, chard, beet leaves, nettles, radish leaves, leek, onion and spring onion greens, parsley, cabbage, or sauerkraut. All these variants, including cabbage, are called zelnik (зелник), from the word зелен (zelen) 'green'. The leek variant is called praznik (празник), and the onion variant is called luchnik (лучник).

In some regions of Bulgaria, the filling is made with rice. There are also fillings with minced meat, onions, and mushrooms. Sweet fillings with apples (similar to apple pie or strudel) or pumpkin with sugar, walnuts, and cinnamon exist as well. In some regions, only walnuts, sugar, and cinnamon are used. The apple variant is called shtrudel (щрудел), and the pumpkin variant is tikvenik (тиквеник).

Modern take on banitsa with milk are made by baking the leaves soaked in milk with sugar, eggs, and vanilla.

=== Preparation ===
In a large greased baking dish, individual sheets are layered one by one with small amounts of filling and sunflower oil and/or melted butter between them. After half of the sheets are placed in the pan, a large portion of the filling is spooned onto the leaves and is then covered with the remaining sheets and filling in the same manner. The pastry is then baked at 200–250 °C. In some recipes, just before the banitsa is finished, a glass of lemonade or sparkling water is poured into the tray, and the baking continues for several more minutes.

An alternative method of preparation is taking each sheet of dough, laying it out flat, and sprinkling some of the fillings on it. Then, the sheet is rolled up into a tight roll, with the filling on the inside. The long roll is then taken and rolled up in a circle. This first sheet of dough is then placed in the baking pan. The process is repeated with the remaining sheets of dough, and each consecutive roll is placed around the first one in the pan. The resulting shape resembles a spiral (see photo). The banitsa is then sprinkled with sunflower oil or melted butter and baked.

== Symbolism ==
Banitsa is considered a symbol of Bulgarian cuisine and traditions. Traditionally, Bulgarians prepare and serve banitsa on two holidays –Christmas and New Year's Eve. On these days, people add kasmeti ("lucky charms") into the banitsa. These are usually small pieces of dogwood branch, which symbolize health and longevity. The branches are hidden inside the banitsa, and the banitsa is then baked. When ready, it is cut into as many pieces as there are members of a family, making sure that each piece contains a piece of dogwood. Two additional pieces are cut—one for the house and another for the Virgin Mary, who is the family's protector. A wish is associated with each branch, and the different number of buds on the branch helps to recognize the corresponding wish. The wishes include happiness, health, love, marriage, baby, wealth, success, travel, etc. The banitsa is then spun on the table, and everyone takes the piece that is in front of them when the spinning stops. The charms inside predict what one is to expect from the new year.

Alternatively, or in addition to the kasmeti, some add a coin or little pieces of paper wrapped in tinfoil, with written fortunes on them.

The word "banitsa" is used as a simile for something (mainly documents and paperwork) creased, or badly maintained. For example, a police officer can make a remark to someone about letting his or her passport "become like a banitsa" (станал е на баница); a teacher might say this about a pupil's notebook.

== See also ==
- List of pastries
