= İçli pide =

Turkish flatbread dish

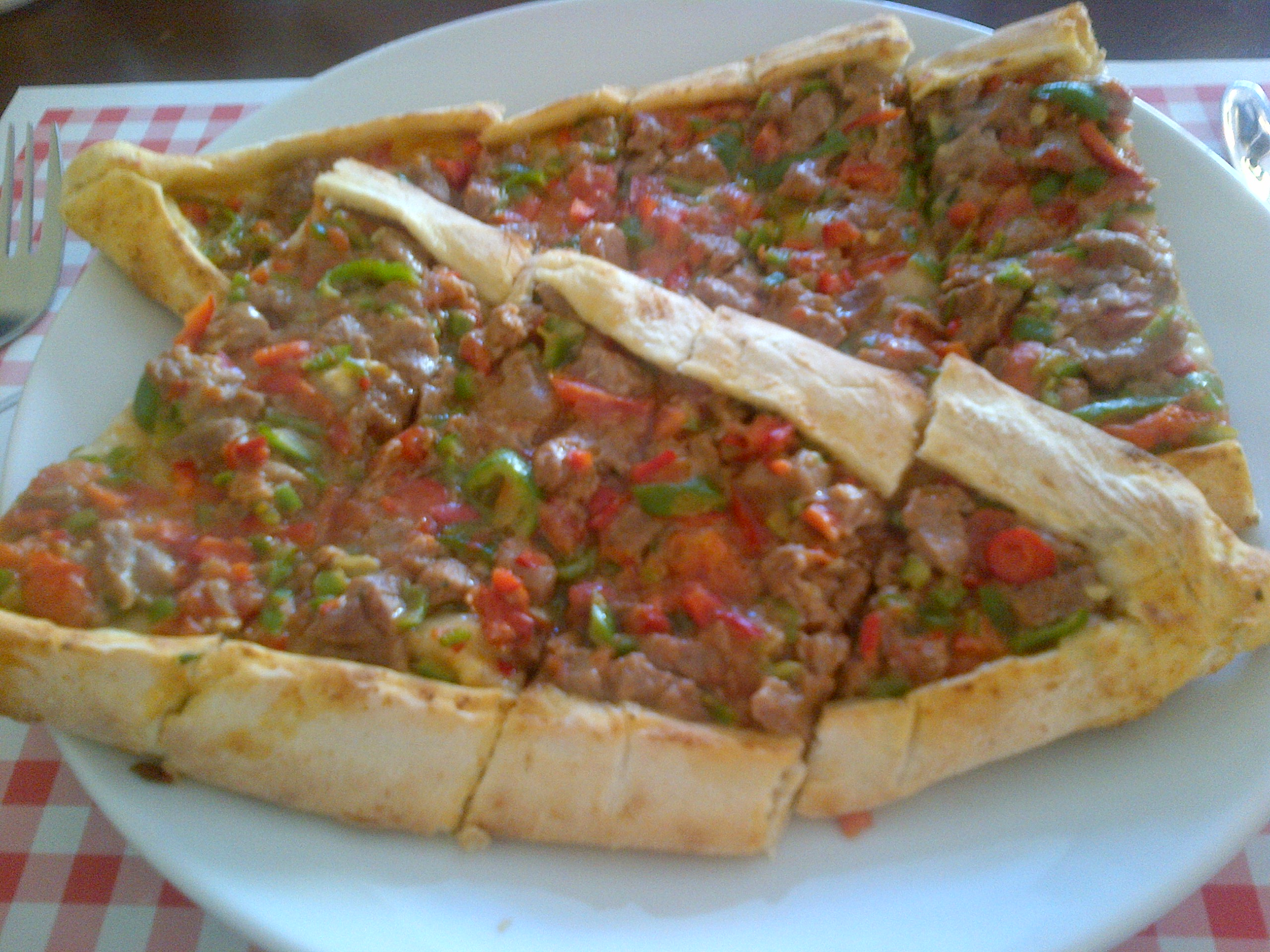
- Course: Main course
- Place of origin: Turkey
- Serving temperature: Hot
- Main ingredients: Beef, leek, dough, meat, cheese, tahini

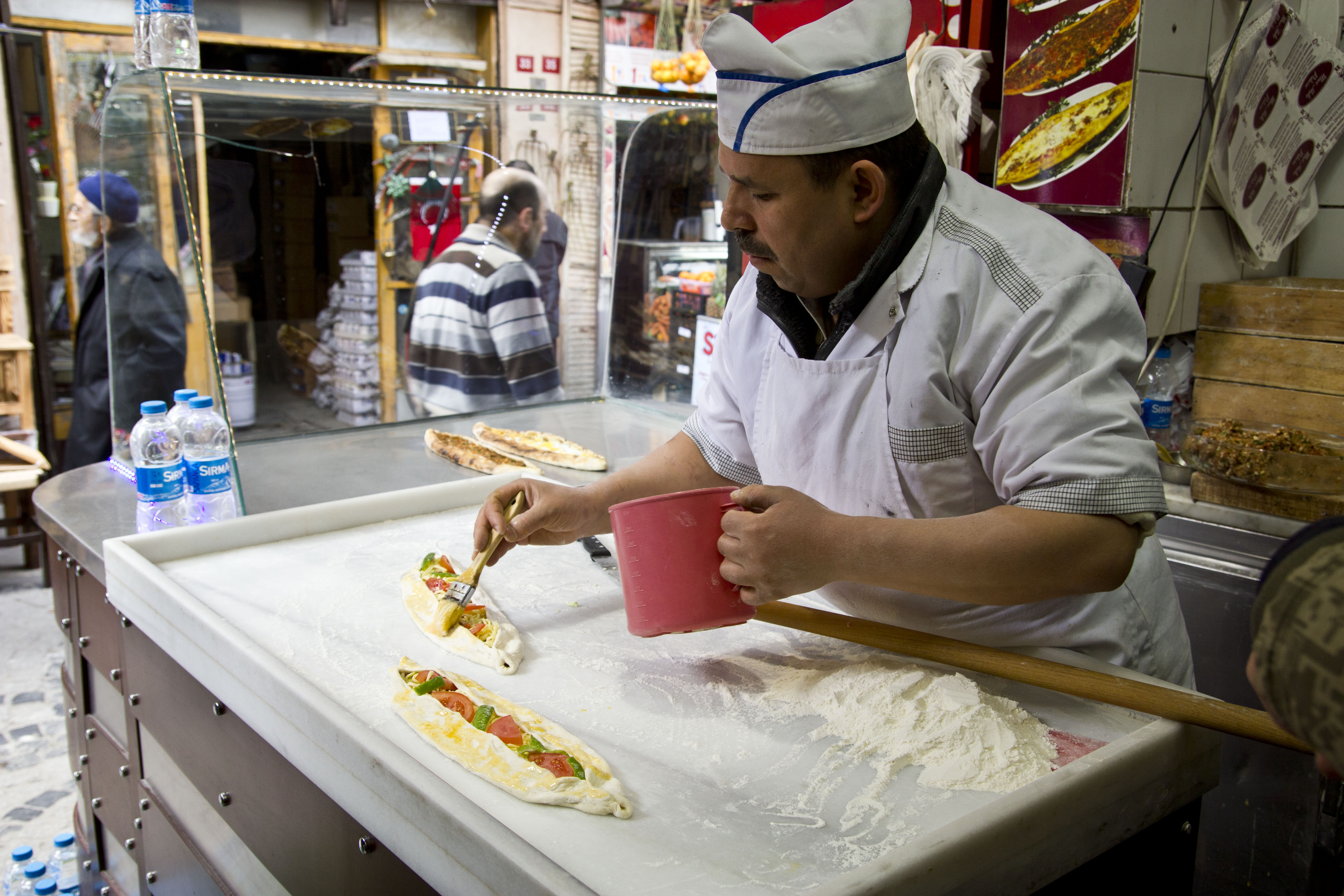
Pideci

İçli pide (Turkish: İçli pide, lit. 'stuffed pide' /ˈpiːdeɪ/, PEE-dae), also called simply pide, is a savory Turkish dish consisting of a flattened, leavened wheat-based dough topped or filled with ingredients such as minced meat, kaşar, beyaz peynir, vegetables, or tahin, and baked at a high temperature, traditionally in a wood-fired oven. It is particularly popular in Aydın and the Black Sea region of Turkey. A person or establishment that makes pide is known as a pideci.

== Variations ==
- Pide with peynir (Peynirli pide)
- Pide with beef (Etli pide)
- Pide with kaşar (Kaşarlı pide)
- Pide with sucuk (Sucuklu pide)
- Pide with pastırma (Pastırmalı pide)
- Pide with peynir and egg (Peynirli yumurtalı pide)
- Pide with beef and egg (Etli yumurtalı pide)
- Pide with kaşar and egg (Kaşarlı yumurtalı pide)
- Pide with sucuk and egg (Sucuklu yumurtalı pide)
- Pide with pastırma and egg (Pastırmalı yumurtalı pide)
- Pide with tahin (Tahinli pide)
- Pide with garlic (Sarımsaklı pide)

== Regional styles ==
- Aydın pidesi
- Karadeniz pidesi
- Kır pidesi
- Güveç pide
- Cıvıklı
- Tahinli pide
- Bursa cantık pide
- Etliekmek
- Lahmacun
- Fındık lahmacun

== See also ==
- Etli ekmek
- Khachapuri
- Pastrmajlija
- Sfiha
