= Pide =

Pide may refer to:

- Pita, a flatbread common in the Middle Eastern cuisine
- İçli pide, a type of stuffed bread in Turkish cuisine, often called simply pide
- PIDE ("Polícia Internacional e de Defesa do Estado or PIDE" – International and State Defense Police; later renamed "Direcção-Geral de Segurança" – General Security Directorate), the political secret police during the authoritarian Portuguese regime of the Estado Novo
- Pakistan Institute of Development Economics, a post-graduate research institute and public policy think tank in Pakistan
