= Lighvan cheese =

Brined curd sheep's milk cheese traditionally made in Iran

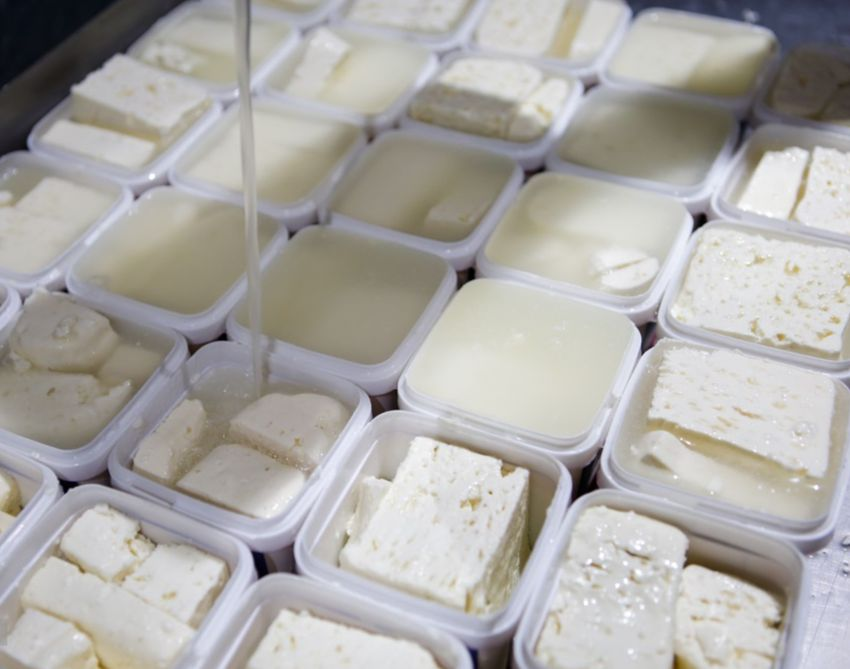
- Alternative names: لیقوان
- Type: Cheese
- Place of origin: Iran
- Region or state: Liqvan
- Associated cuisine: Iranian cuisine

Lighvan (Persian: پنیر لیقوان) is a sour and brined curd cheese traditionally made from sheep's milk in Liqvan, a village in Iran.

== Processing ==
Lighvan cheese, one of the most popular Iranian traditional cheeses, is a starter-free cheese from the Iranian region, in the north-west of Iran, and manufactured from raw ewe's milk. It ripens in 10 to 12% salt brine for 3 or 4 months at an average temperature of 10 ± 2 °C. In spite of the increasing popularity of Lighvan cheese, there are few studies on its chemical composition and microbial communities The milk is coagulated with rennet tablets, then the curd is packed into triangular cloth bags and is allowed to drain thoroughly. The triangular blocks of cheese, which are about 20 cm (7.9 in) thick, are removed from the bag and put in an earthenware pot. Then they are covered with salt, and are left for two days.

== Cooking and eating ==
The cheese is usually served for breakfast or dinner with fresh bread.

== Similar cheeses around the world ==
Similar cheeses can be found in:

- Albania (djath i bardhë or djath i gjirokastrës)
- Bulgaria (сирене, sirene)
- Egypt (domiati); Sudan (gibna beyda)
- Finland (salaattijuusto, salad cheese)
- Georgia (ყველი, kveli, lit. cheese)
- Greece (Feta)
- Israel (gvina bulgarit, lit. Bulgarian cheese)
- Lebanon (gibneh bulgharieh, lit. Bulgarian cheese)
- North Macedonia (бело сирење, belo sirenje, lit. white cheese)
- Poland (bryndza)
- Romania (brânză telemea)
- Russia (брынза, brynza)
- Serbia (сир, sir)
- Turkey (beyaz peynir, lit. white cheese)
- Ukraine (бринза, brynza)

== See also ==
- Brined cheese – Cheese that is matured in brine
- List of cheeses
