= Kashkaval =

Semi-hard cheese from the Balkans

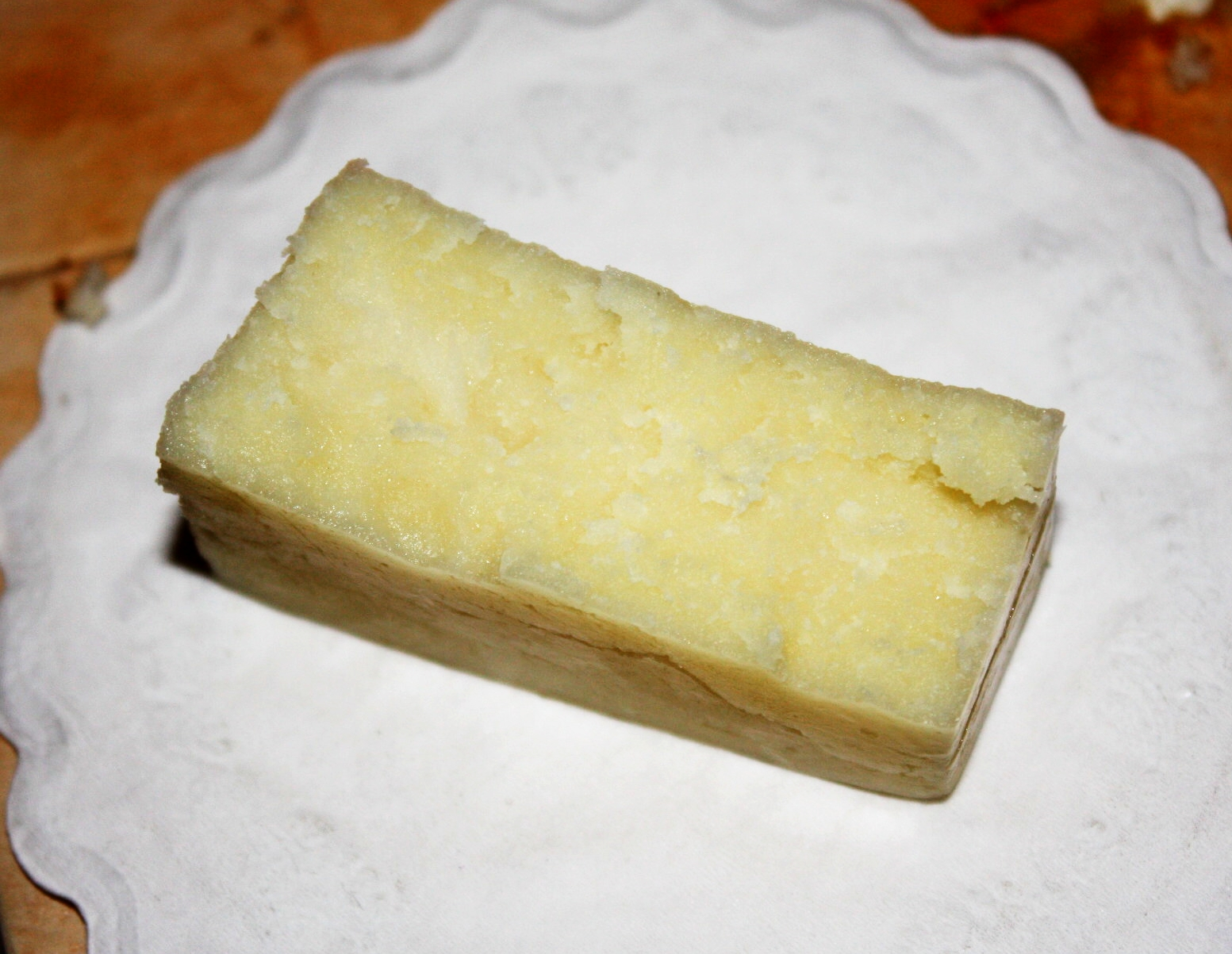
- Source of milk: Cow, sheep, goat
- Pasteurised: Traditionally, no
- Texture: Semi-hard

Kashkaval (Note: Romanian: cașcaval [kaʃkaˈval]; Bulgarian: кашкавал [kɐʃkɐˈvaɫ]; Macedonian: кашкавал [kaʃkaˈvaɫ]; Serbian: качкаваљ, romanized: kačkavalj; Albanian: kaçkavall; Russian: кашкавал; Turkish: kaşkaval or kaşar; Arabic: قشقوان, romanized: qashqawān.) is a type of cheese made from the milk of cows, sheep, goats, or a mixture thereof, popular in the Balkans, Turkey, and the Levant. In Hungary, kashkaval (Hungarian: kaskavál) refers specifically to this type of cheese, whereas, in the rest of the Balkans, Turkey and the Levant, the term is often used to refer to all yellow cheeses (or even any cheese other than sirene). In English-language menus in Bulgaria, kashkaval is translated as 'yellow cheese' (whereas sirene is usually translated as 'white cheese' or simply 'cheese').

== Etymology ==
The name kashkaval possibly comes from the Italian caciocavallo.

Another theory claims that it is related to the Romanian caș, 'cheese', but the kaval part remains unexplained.

== Locality ==
=== Albania ===
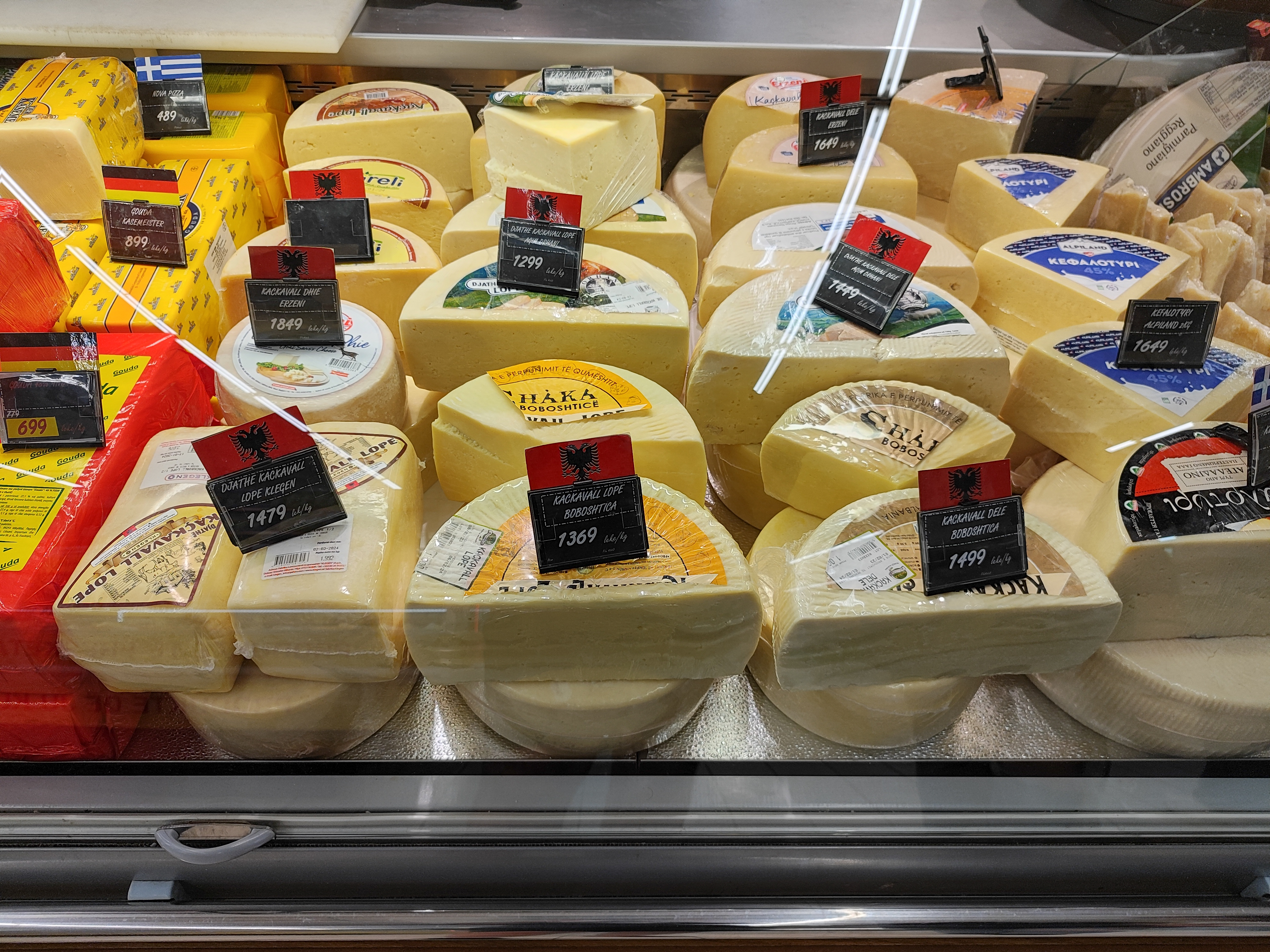
Albanian kaçkavall

In Albania, kaçkavall is the most popular type of cheese after djathë i bardhë (white cheese). It is considered a traditional Albanian cheese, and is widely used as a side dish. Some traditional restaurants will bring plates of raw or fried kaçkavall for no additional cost before the main dishes finish cooking. All dairy companies in Albania produce kaçkavall and mainly use cow's or sheep's milk, but some also use goat's milk, though not as frequently.

=== Bulgaria ===
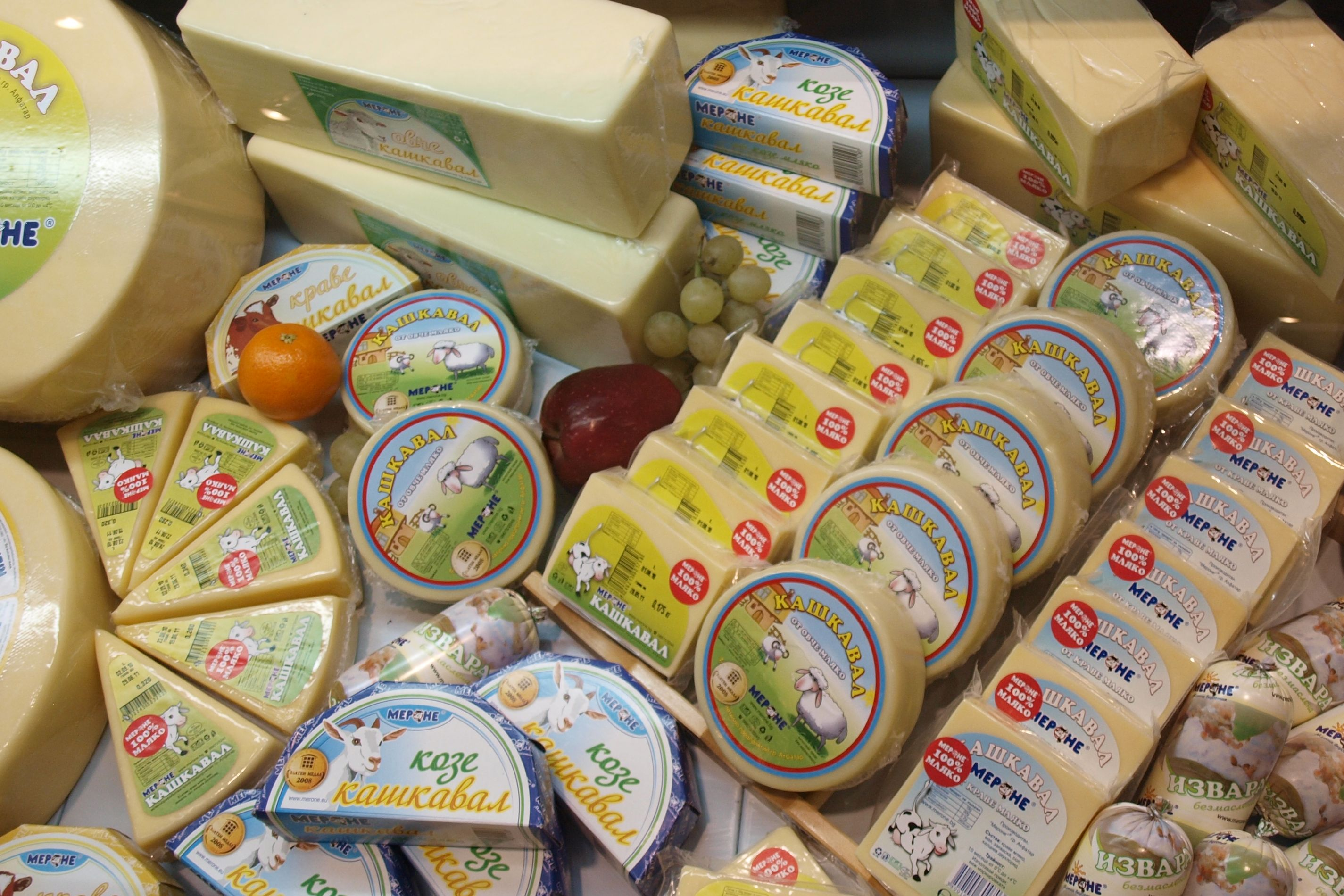
Vacuum packed kashkaval

In Bulgaria, kashkaval vitosha is made from cow's milk, kashkaval balkan from ewe's milk, and kashkaval preslav is made from a mixture of the two.

Kashkaval is used in many breakfast pastries. A common dish with kashkaval is kashkavalka, a little pastry containing kashkaval inside and on top. As in the other Balkan countries, kashkaval substitutes for other cheeses, especially in pizzas. A popular Bulgarian snack is princesa (Bulgarian: принцеса; lit. 'princess'), toast topped with kashkaval or with ground pork and kashkaval.

=== Romania and Moldova ===
In Romania and Moldova, cașcaval is used to refer to a number of types of yellow medium and semi hard cheeses made of sheep's or cow's milk. The best known varieties of cașcaval in Romania are dobrogea (from sheep's milk only), penteleu (from mix of sheep's and cow's milk), dalia and rucăr (both from cow's milk only). But the term is often used by extension as a generic name for all semi-hard yellow cheeses such as the Swiss Emmental cheese, the Dutch Gouda and the British Cheddar, or anything that looks similar to cașcaval.

During the communist regime, because of the food shortages, Romanian housewives developed a technique for a homemade pressed cheese, similar to cașcaval, made out of milk, smântână, butter and eggs. In Romanian cuisine, a lot of dishes are made with cașcaval, such as cașcaval pane or mămăligă.

=== North Macedonia ===
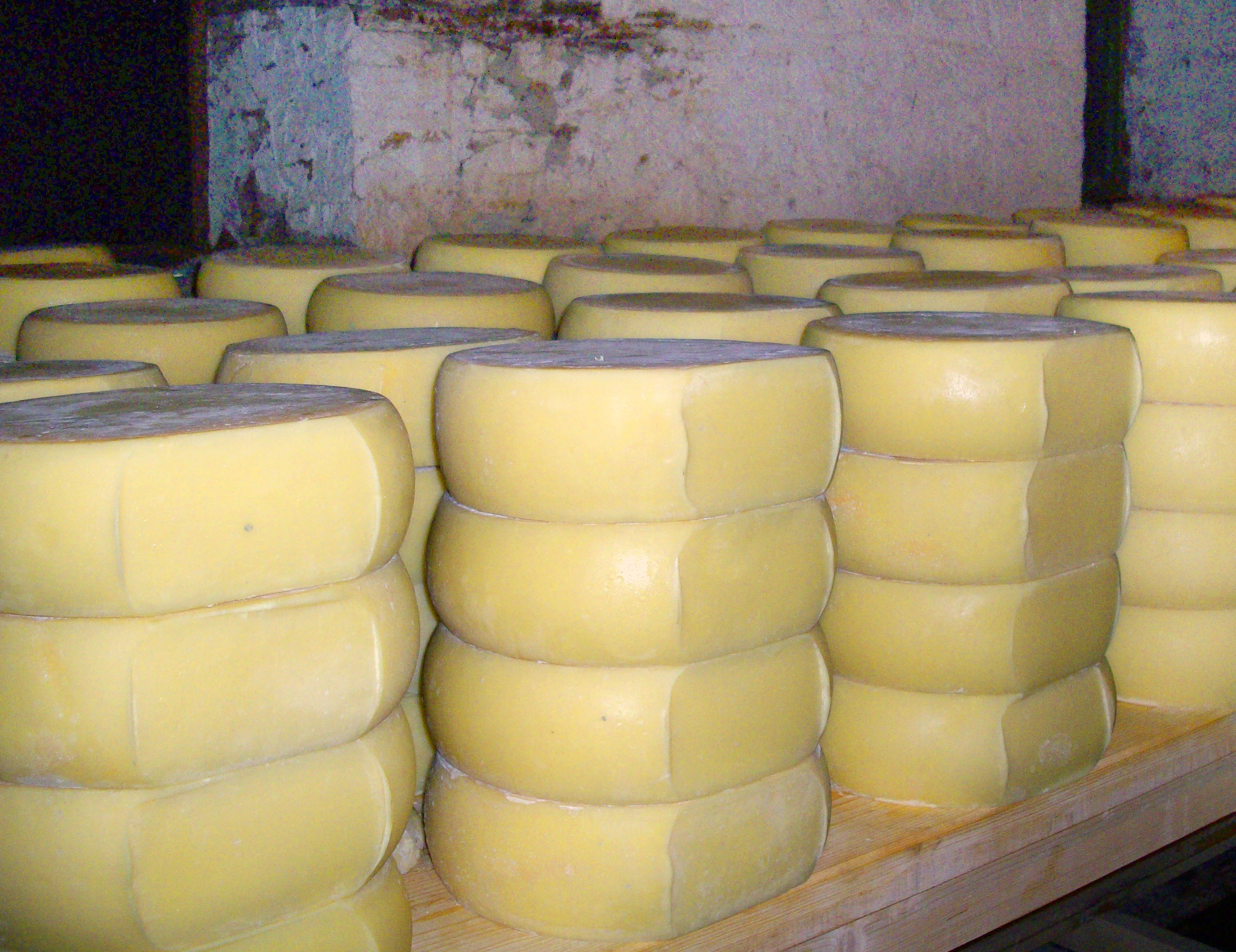
Maturing kashkaval from North Macedonia

Kashkaval cheese is very popular in North Macedonia. It is mostly made of cow's milk, however both a sheep's milk and a mixed (cow's and sheep's milk) variant are widely available. Kashkaval is also a synonym for any yellow cheese, to the extent that the word "cheese" mostly means white cheese such as feta, while yellow cheeses such as Gouda or Emmental have the suffix kashkaval attached to them in everyday speech, as simply calling them cheese would be ludicrous, since they're not white cheeses.

=== Serbia ===
In Serbia, kačkavalj is traditionally a sheep milk hard cheese, and as such a protected brand of the city of Pirot. Other cheeses, made from a mix of cow and sheep milk, are sometimes also branded as kačkavalj but they cannot be defined as pirotski (of Pirot).

Kačkavalj is one of the six traditional cheeses of Serbia. The production process (in Serbian) can be seen online, and according to a TV show video clip, it was brought to Pirot in the 1810s with the Dalmatian or Italian cheesemakers who settled in then-Ottoman Empire; the cheese was distributed throughout the Balkans (specifically mentioned in the link are Salonica and Istanbul).

=== Hungary ===
In Hungary, the cheese is called kaskavál. The most prominent brand of Hungarian kashkaval is Hajdú, which is sold both domestically and internationally.

=== Turkey ===
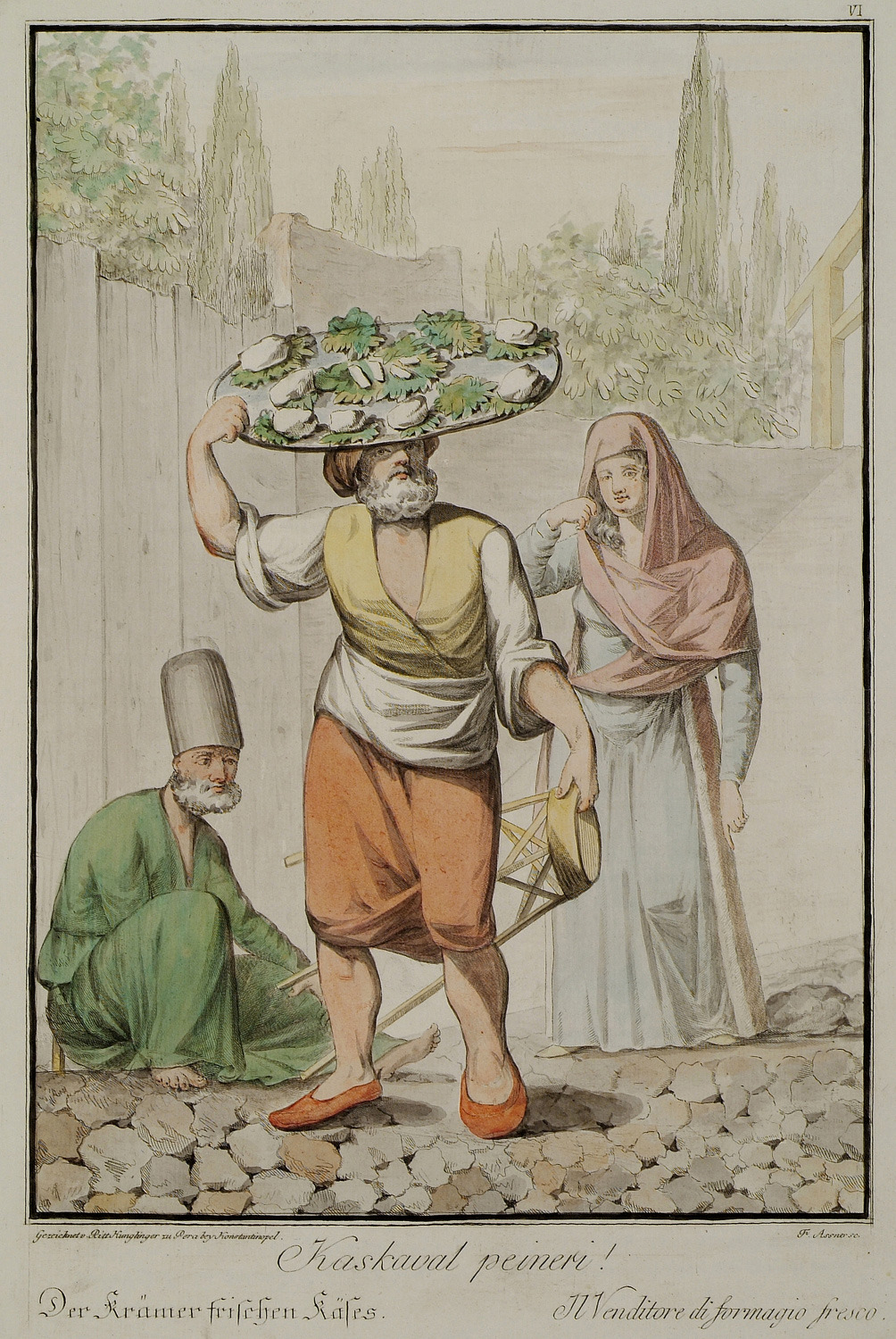
Kaşkaval seller in Istanbul in a 19th-century drawing

Kaşkaval (Ottoman: penir-i kaskaval) was a type of cheese consumed in Ottoman feasts. Evliya Çelebi's Seyahatnâme mentions that there at his time (17th century) in Istanbul 400 artisans produced different types of cheese: among them, cut cheese, teleme cheese and kaşkaval. In the same book is also mentioned that kaşkaval cheese was produced in Çatalca.

=== Levant ===
In the Levant (Syria, Jordan, Israel, Palestine, and Lebanon), qashqawān is widely used as a melting cheese, particularly in pastries. Hungarian-made kashkaval is the most common type found in the region. In Israel, the Hungarian kashkaval is virtually unknown, and the domestically consumed kashkaval is produced locally from cow and sheep milk by both the large dairies (Tnuva under the brand name Gil'ad, Tara Dairy under the brand name Noam) and by boutique dairies, such as Gad and Jacobs. Imported kashkaval is represented in Israeli grocery stores by the Euro Cheese brand.

=== Ukraine ===
In the Cossack Hetmanate kashkaval was also known under the name gliaganka (Ukrainian: ґляґанка) and was prepared from fermented cow or sheep milk.

=== Russia ===
Kashkaval cheese is also eaten in Russia. In addition to the Balkan and Italian products, there exists also a Russian brand of kashkaval.

== See also ==
- List of stretch-curd cheeses
