= Kabaklı peynirli börek =

Turkish pastry

- Type: Börek
- Place of origin: Turkey
- Main ingredients: Phyllo, zucchini

Kabaklı peynirli börek is a savory Turkish börek made from phyllo and stuffed with a filling made primarily of zucchini and beyaz peynir. Its name is a compound word which derives from "kabak" (Turkish for zucchini) and "börek".
