= Balkánský sýr =

White brined cheese from Czechia and Slovakia

Balkánský sýr Balkánsky syr
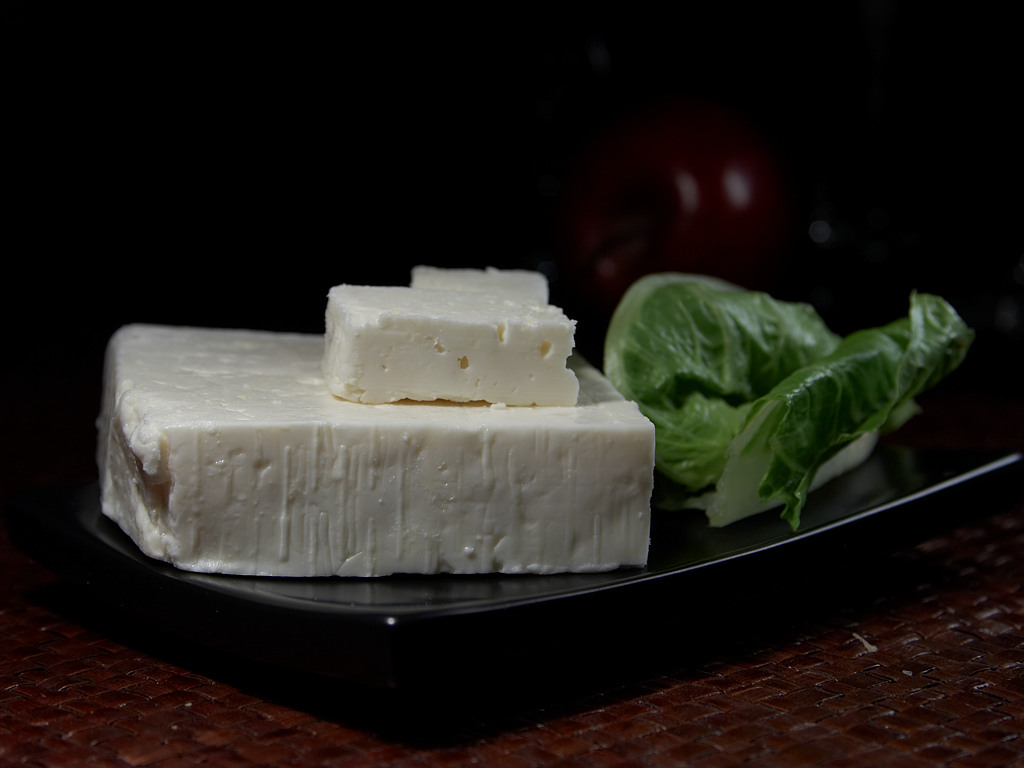
- Country of origin: Czech Republic and Slovakia
- Pasteurised: Varies
- Texture: Varies
- Aging time: Generally none
- Named after: Balkans

Balkánský sýr (czech), Balkánsky syr (slovak) (English: Balkan cheese) is a type of white brined cheese produced from cow's milk in Czech Republic and Slovakia. It is a salty semi-hard white cheese, analogous to Bulgarian sirene, and Greek feta. It is usually not matured (Czech: nezrající).

It is mainly used as a substitute of sirene in the Bulgarian shopska salad or instead of feta in greek salad.

== See also ==
- List of cheeses
