= Pastrmajlija =

Macedonian bread pie

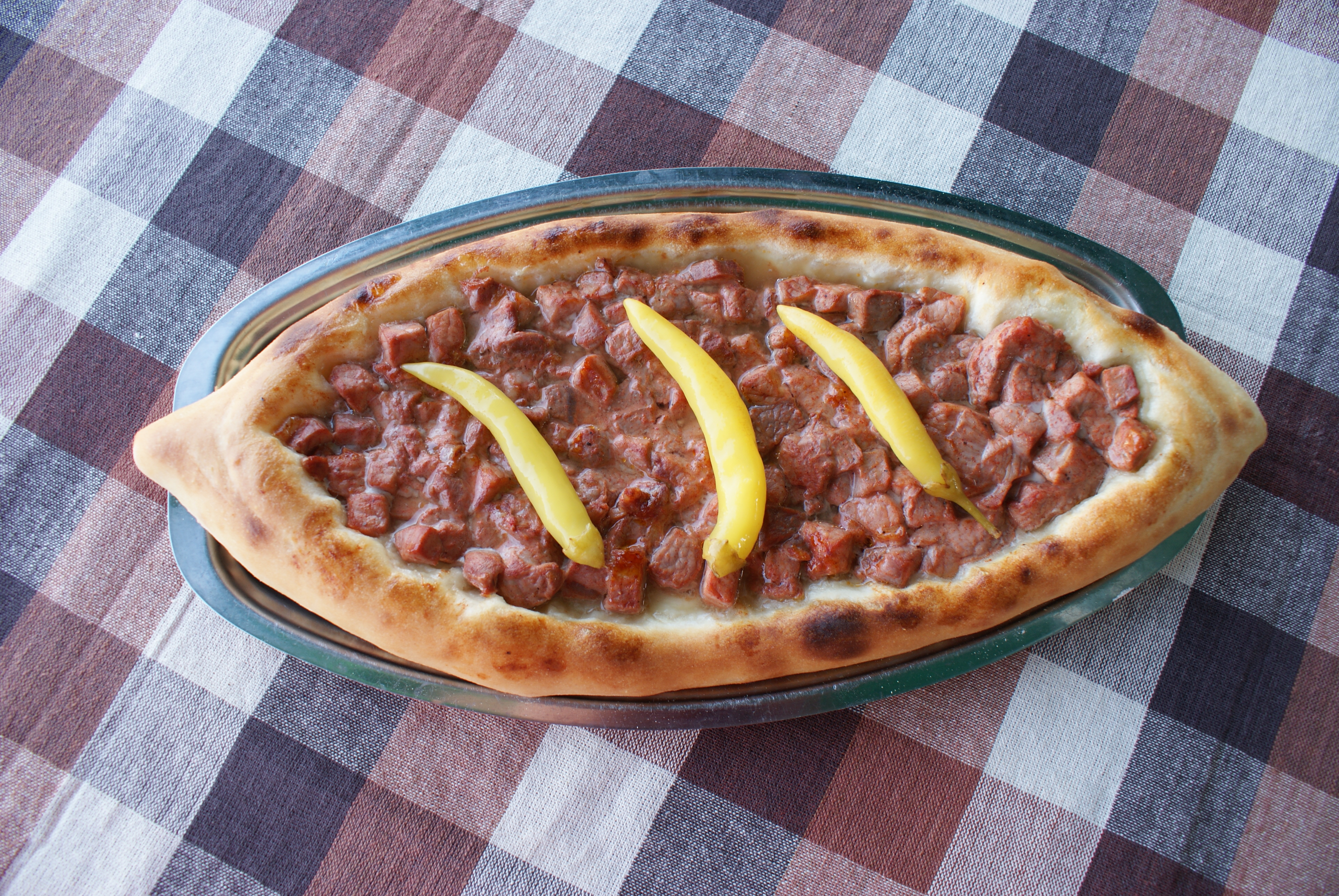
- Type: Pie
- Course: Main
- Place of origin: North Macedonia
- Region or state: Štip, Sveti Nikole, Veles, Kratovo, and Negotino
- Serving temperature: Hot
- Main ingredients: Dough, meat
- Food energy (per serving): 1,000 kcal (4,200 kJ)

Pastrmajlija (Macedonian: Пастрмајлија), also rendered as Pastrmalija (Macedonian: Пастрмалија), is a Macedonian bread pie made from dough, cheese, eggs and meat. Pastrmajlija is usually oval-shaped with sliced meat cubes on top of it. Varieties use smoked or dried pork and poultry meat, while others use eggs, lard, sheep cheese, kashkaval, mushrooms and spicy pickled pepper. Its name is derived from the word pastrma, meaning salted and dried mutton, sheep or lamb meat (cf. "pastırma"). The Macedonian digital dictionary calls it "pastrmalija".

It is popular in Štip, Veles, Sveti Nikole, Kratovo, and Negotino. The city of Štip organizes an annual pastrmajlija festival called Štipska Pastrmalijada.

== See also ==
- Etli ekmek
- Khachapuri
- Cantiq
