= Tahinli pide =

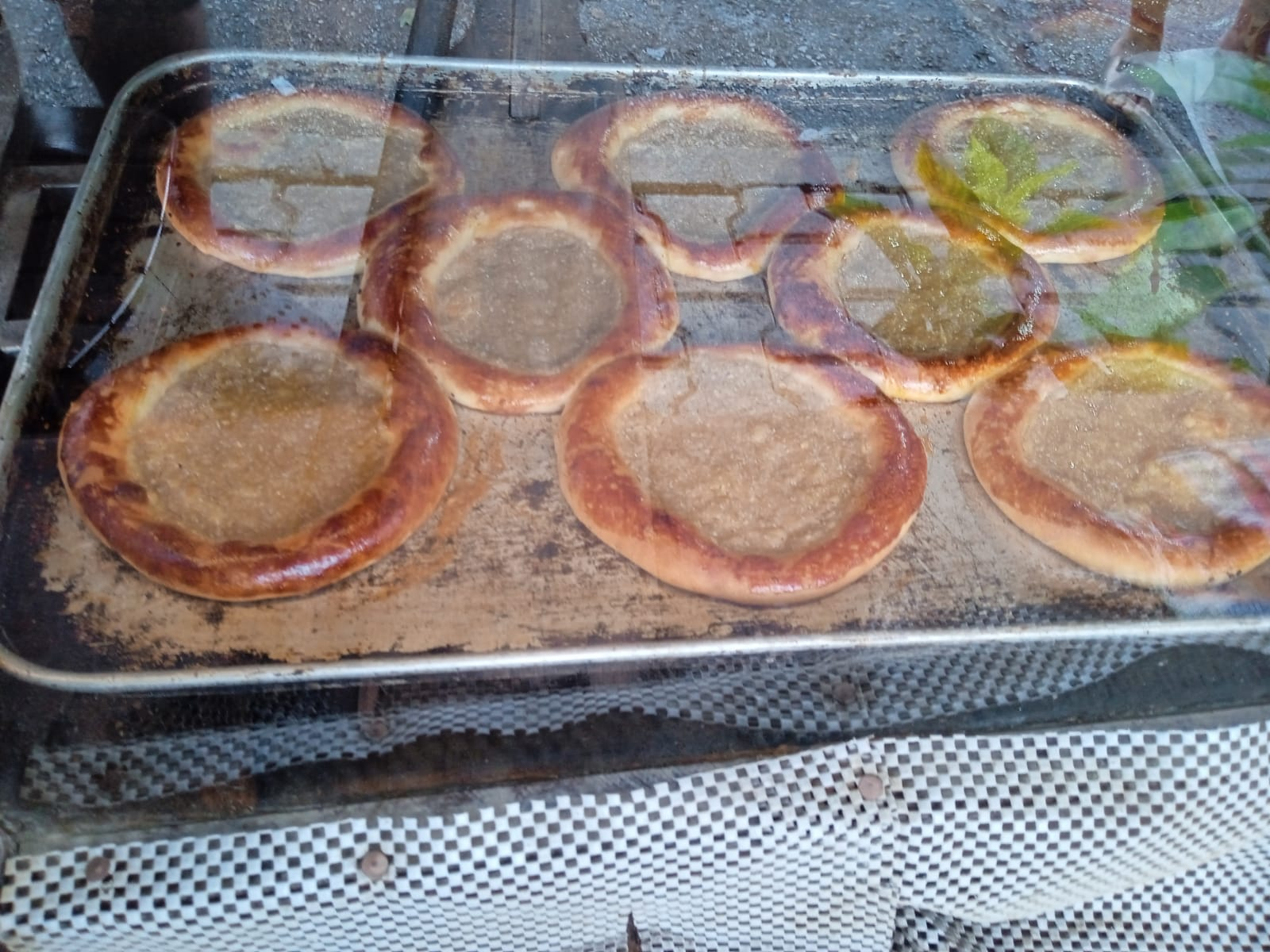
- Tahinli pide from Bursa, Turkey
- Alternative names: 8 pizza-like flatbreads with white tahini topping
- Type: İçli pide
- Place of origin: Turkey
- Region or state: Turkey
- Main ingredients: tahini (sesame paste)

Tahinli Pide is a Turkish İçli pide flavoured with sesame paste (tahini). Originating from the Ottoman period, the pide is part of Turkish cuisine's culinary heritage and continues to draw attention, not just from locals but also from tourists. In Turkey, tahinli pide is also related to similar pastries such as "Aksaray tahinlisi", a geographically registered specialty.

Although similar Tahinli Pide recipes with slight variations are found in different cities in Turkey, Bursa Tahinli Pide is the best-known version.

== Regional Tahinli Pide Styles ==
- Aydın tahinli pide
- Bursa tahinli pide
- Kadınhanı tahinli pide
- Kayseri tahinli pide
- Kula şekerli pide
- Niğde tahinli pide
- Simav tahinli pide
- Tavas tahinli pide

== See also ==
- Sweet roll
- Fig roll
- Cinnamon roll
- Tahini roll
- Pita

== Footnotes ==
- Bursa'nın meşhur tahinli pidesi nerede yenir?
- Bursalıların asırlık damak tadı tahinli pide
- Tahinli pide tarifi
