= Geographical indications in Singapore =

Geographical Indications in Singapore are a form of intellectual property consisting of an "indication used in trade to identify goods as originating from a place", provided that "a given quality, reputation or other characteristic of the goods is essentially attributable to that place". Geographical indications originating from any member of the Paris Convention or the WTO can be registered. As of August 2021, 142 Indications have been registered. Geographical indications are registered for a renewable term of 10 years.

== Legal basis ==
Geographical indications can be registered based on the Geographical Indications Act 2014 and the Geographical Indications Rules 2019. The Act replaced the Geographical Indications Act and introduced the registration system. The legislation was aimed at providing protection according to the minimum standards in the TRIPS agreement and to implement a registration system according to the requirements set in the European Union–Singapore Free Trade Agreement. The act entered into force on 1st April 2019.

== Registered Geographical Indications ==
As of August 2021, 166 Geographical Indications had been registered, none of which originating from Singapore. As Singapore had committed to protection of 100 EU Geographical Indications, the majority stems from EU countries. The breakdown by country of origin is shown below:

Countries of origin for Singapore registered Geographical Indications
Country	Number of registrations	Date of first registration	Examples
Austria	5	2019	Tiroler Speck
Belgium	1	2019	Korn/Kornbrand (with Austria and Germany)
Cyprus	4	2019	Ούζο/Ouzo (with Greece)
Czech Republic	3	2019	České pivo
Denmark	1	2019	Danablu
Finland	2	2019	Suomalainen Vodka/Finsk Vodka/Vodka of Finland
France	43	2019	Roquefort
Germany	9	2019	Lübecker Marzipan
Greece	5	2019	Φέτα/Feta
Hungary	4	2019	Pálinka
Ireland	2	2019	Irish cream
Italy	44	2019	Gorgonzola
Japan	1	2020	市田柿/Ichida Gaki/Ichida Kaki
Poland	1	2019	Polska Wódka/Polish Vodka
Portugal	6	2019	Douro
Romania	3	2019	Dealu Mare
Spain	31	2019	Rioja
Sweden	2	2019	Svensk Vodka/Swedish Vodka
United Kingdom	1	2019	Irish Whiskey/Uisce Beatha Eireannach/Irish Whisky (with Ireland)

As of August 2023, one Geographical Indication application is still pending, as a result of opposition proceedings: Prosecco (initiated by Australian Grape and Wine Incorporated).

== Types ==
According to the Schedule to the act, 14 food categories are distinguished:

1. Wines
2. Spirits
3. Beers
4. Cheese
5. Meat and meat products
6. Seafood
7. Edible oils
8. Non-edible oils
9. Fruits
10. Vegetables
11. Spices and condiments
12. Confectionery and baked goods
13. Flowers and parts of flowers
14. Natural gum
