= Sirene =

White brined cheese from Bulgaria

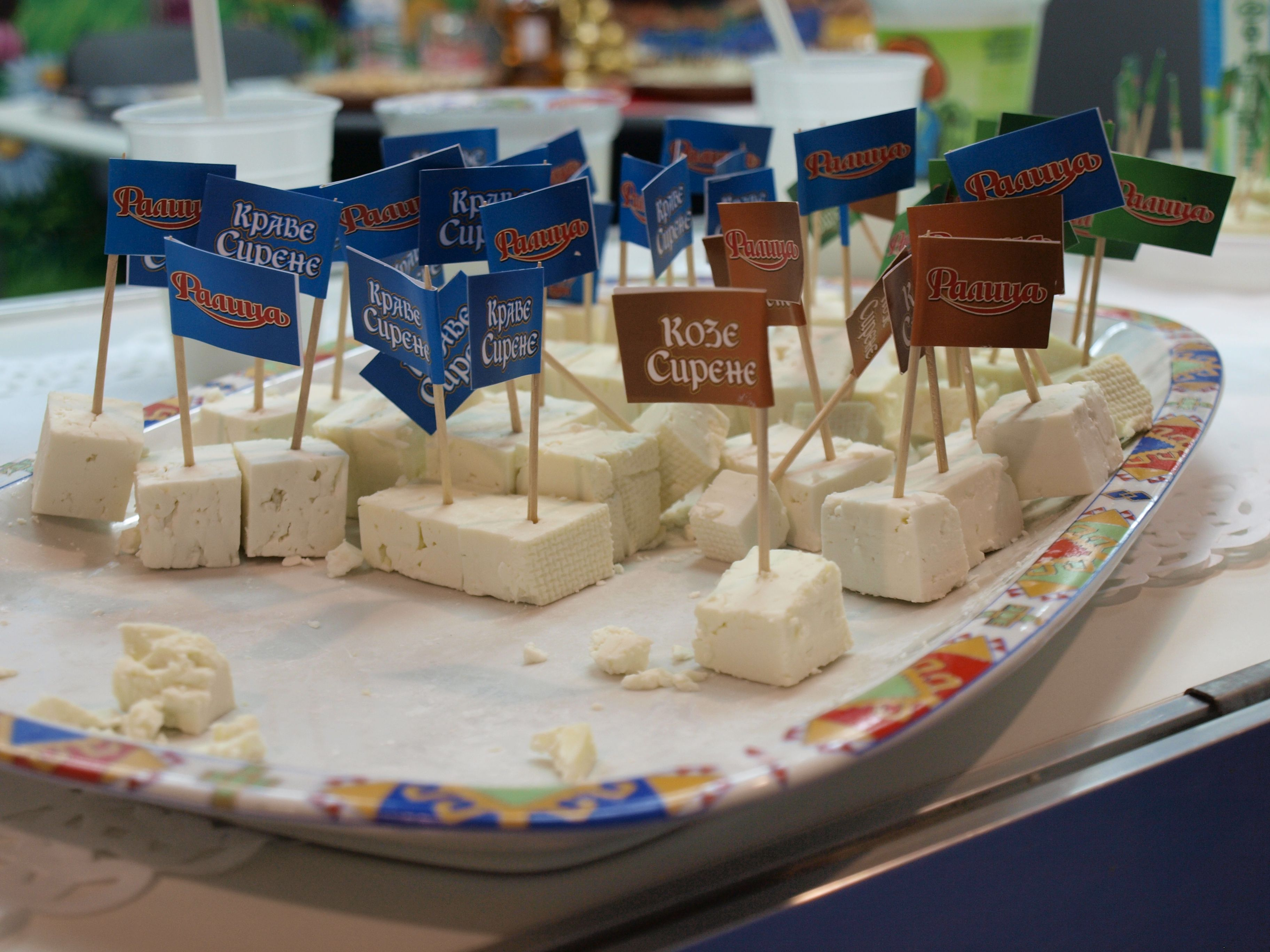
- Sirene cubes
- Other names: White cheese
- Country of origin: Bulgaria
- Source of milk: Goat, sheep, cow, buffalo
- Pasteurised: Depends on variety
- Texture: Depends on variety
- Aging time: Min. 3 months
- Certification: PDO: 2023

Sirene (Bulgarian: сирене [ˈsirɛnɛ]; Serbian: сир/sir; Macedonian: сирење; Albanian: djathë i bardhë), also known as "white brine sirene" (Bulgarian: бяло саламурено сирене), is a type of brined cheese originating from Bulgaria. It is made from the milk of goats, sheep, cows, buffalo or a mixture thereof. It is slightly crumbly, with at least 46–48% of dry matter containing 44–48% of fat. It is commonly produced in blocks, and has a slightly grainy texture. It is used as a table cheese, in salads, and in baking.

In 2023, the name "Bulgarsko byalo salamureno sirene" was registered as a protected designation of origin in the European Union.

== Recipes ==
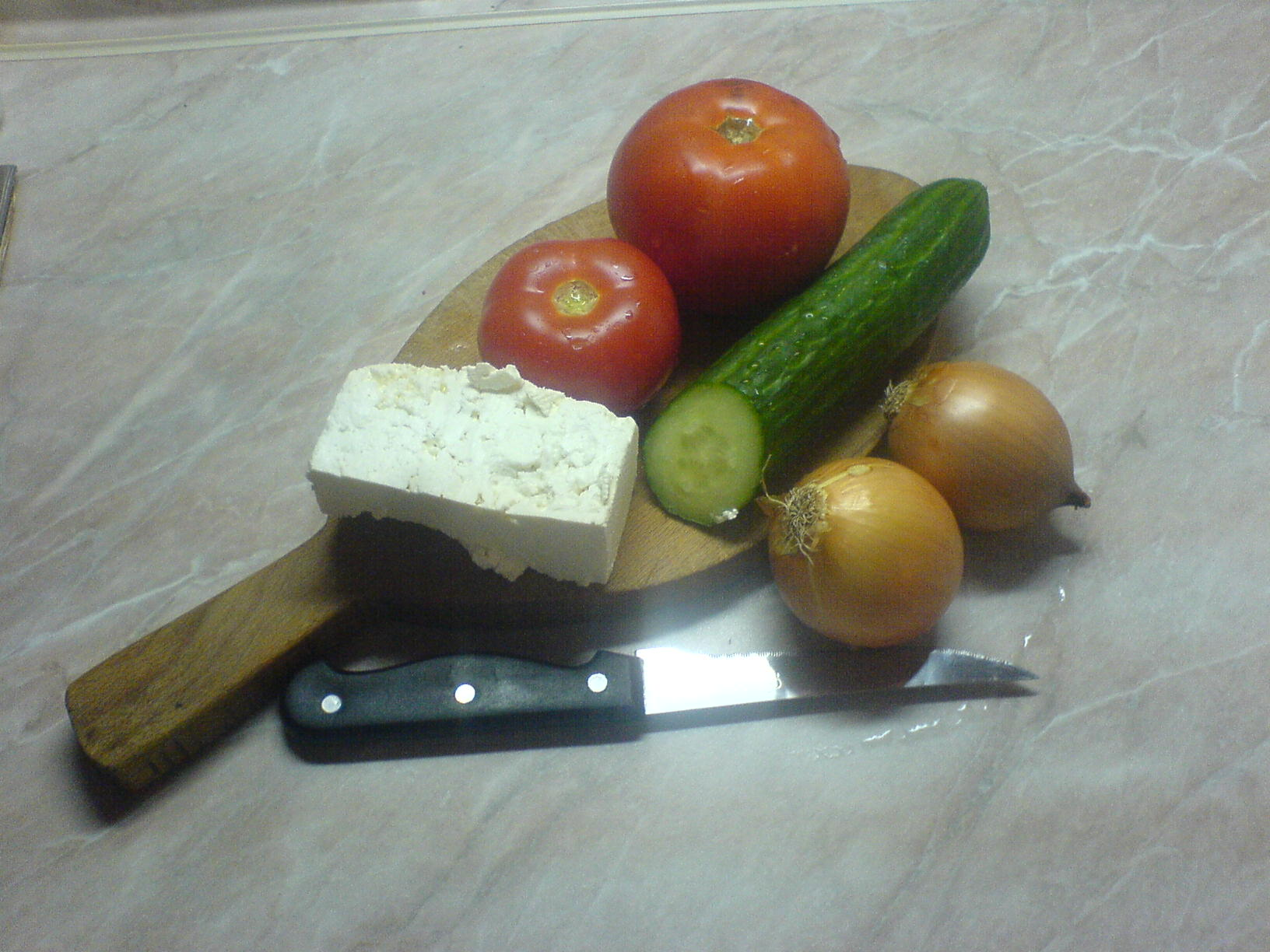
Products for preparation of Bulgarian shopska salad (including sirene)

Traditional dishes using sirene are:

Soups: potato or vegetable soup with sirene (сиренява чорба).

Salads: shopska salad with tomatoes, bell peppers, cucumbers, onions and sirene. Ovcharska salad ('shepherd's salad') with the above-mentioned vegetables, cheese, ham, boiled eggs and olives. Tomatoes with sirene is a traditional light salad during the summer.

Eggs: fried eggs and omelettes with sirene. There is also a popular kind of boiled eggs over mashed sirene with a sauce of yogurt, garlic, parsley and walnuts (яйца по панагюрски; Panagyurishte-style eggs).

Pasta and cornmeal: for breakfast, macaroni or flat noodles (Bulgarian: юфка; yufka) with sirene and sugar are popular. Kachamak (the local variant of cornmeal, polenta or the Romanian mămăligă) is always eaten with sirene.

Pastry: the traditional banitsa and other kinds of pastry are also made with sirene.

Stuffed peppers are sometimes filled with this type of cheese.

It is also served as an appetizer.

== Similar cheeses in other countries ==
Many Balkan and other cheeses are similar to (but not the same as) sirene, and are known by various names. The local consumers of each country are usually well aware of the differences between the various white cheeses. Part of the differences are that the breeds of sheep and goats in each region are different, and their feed may have specific regional characteristics that affect the taste and texture of cheese made from their milk.

- Albania: djathë i bardhë – white cheese
- Czech Republic: Balkánský sýr – Balkan cheese
- Greece: feta – protected designation of origin (PDO)
- Iran: Lighvan or Tabrizi paneer – cheese of Lighvan or Tabriz
- Israel: Bulgarit (בולגרית) – Bulgarian (cheese)
- Lebanon: Bulghari (بلغاري) – Bulgarian (cheese)
- Mexico: cotija cheese
- Romania: telemea
- Russia: bryndza (Брынза)
- Türkiye: beyaz peynir – white cheese
- Ukraine: bryndza (бринза)

== See also ==
- List of cheeses
- Kashkaval
