= Gorgonzola =

Italian blue cheese

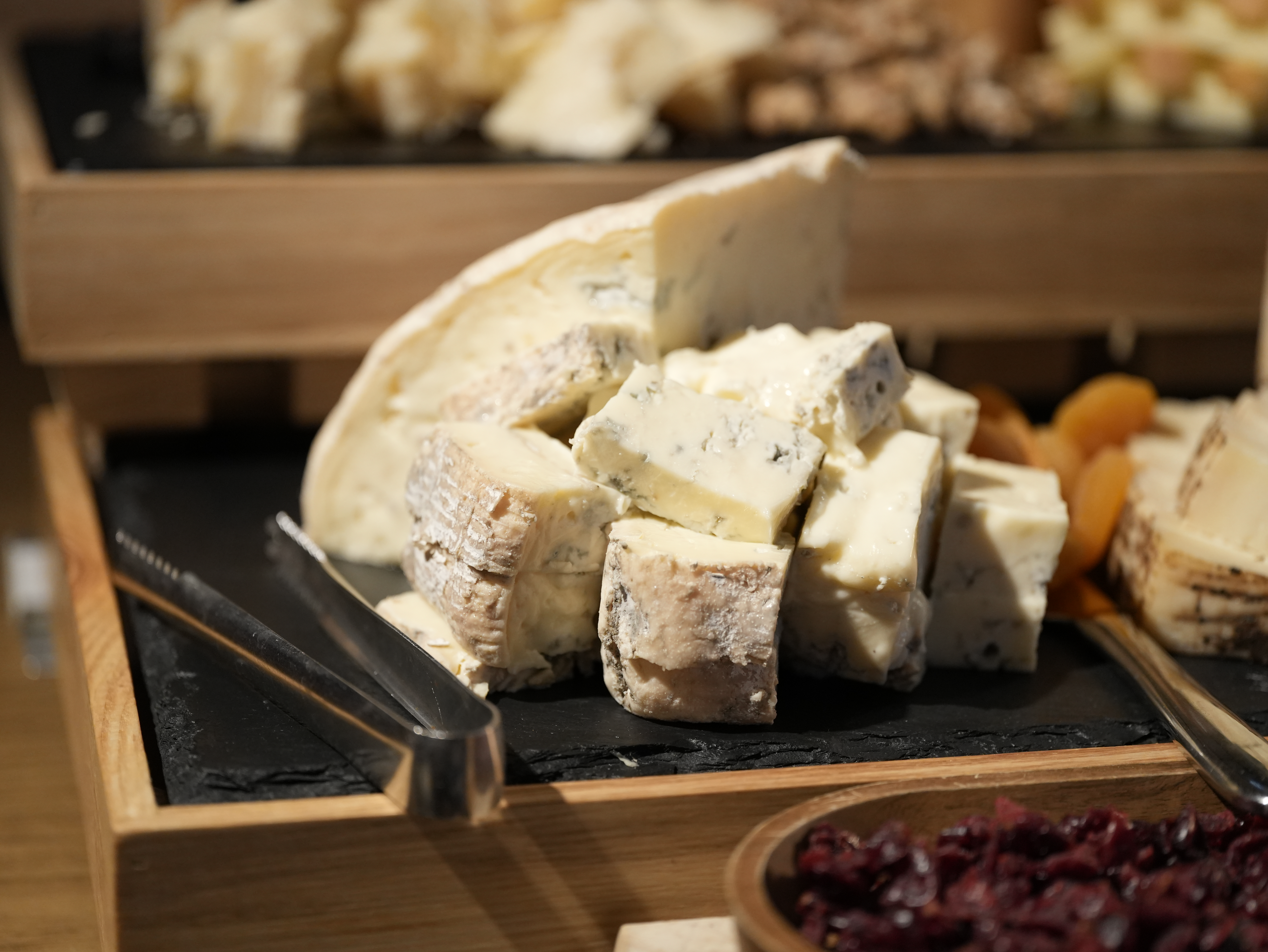
- Country of origin: Italy
- Region: Lombardy
- Town: Gorgonzola, Milan
- Source of milk: Cows
- Pasteurized: Yes
- Texture: Soft and crumbly
- Fat content: 25–35%
- Aging time: 3–4 months
- Certification: Italy: DOC from 1955; EU: PDO from 1996

Gorgonzola (/ˌɡɔːrɡənˈzoʊlə/, Italian: [ɡorɡonˈdzɔːla]) is an Italian blue cheese made from unskimmed cow's milk, believed to have been created in the 9th century. Today the use of its name is controlled under the criteria of a protected designation of origin (PDO).

Gorgonzola is available in two dominant variations: dolce, with a more delicate flavor and buttery consistency, and piccante, with a more pungent flavor and firm, crumbly texture. Either can be quite salty, with a "bite" from their blue veining.

The cheese takes its name from the Lombardian town of Gorgonzola, Milan, where the cheese originated. It celebrates an annual Gorgonzola festival each September, known as the Sagra Nazionale del Gorgonzola DOP.

Within the European Union and countries recognizing the PDO, a cheese bearing the name Gorgonzola may only originate from its closely defined geographic locale. Outside the EU and countries recognizing the PDO, the name Gorgonzola may legally be used to imitations, such as those from Wisconsin and Vermont in the United States, or elsewhere.

== History ==
Gorgonzola has been produced for centuries in Gorgonzola, Milan, acquiring its greenish-blue marbling in the 11th century. The town's claim of geographical origin is disputed by other nearby localities.

For example, another possible place of origin is the cheese-making area known for ancient dairy traditions, Pasturo nella Valsassina. This is because of the presence of natural caves that stay at the ideal temperature (between 6 and 12 degrees Celsius) to make Gorgonzola and many other cheeses. Gorgonzola was supposedly created in the Middle Ages from the years 879–1007 AD.

There is a Lombardy legend of Gorgonzola's origin where a cheese maker added new fresh curds to a vat and left it open all night. He forgot about the curds because he was in a rush to meet his lover. He attempted to fix his mistake and added fresh curds to the vat and a few months later he was surprised with a new bluish mold that had grown on his cheese. He tasted this and realized the surprisingly great and unique taste of the cheese. This was also the first discovery of the process of erborinatura, the creation of mold.

Gorgonzola was referred to as stracchino verde until the early 20th century: stracchino used to describe a number of young, soft cheeses—and verde refers to the cheese's blue-green veining.

Gorgonzola has been recognized since 1955 as a DOC in its dolce and piccante variations—and since 1996, it has been registered as a DOP.

== Production ==
Gorgonzola is mainly produced in the Italian regions of Piedmont and Lombardy. The whey is removed during curdling, and the result is aged at low temperatures.

During the ageing process, metal rods are quickly inserted and removed, creating air channels that allow the mould spores to grow into hyphae and cause the cheese's characteristic veining. Gorgonzola is typically aged for three to four months. The length of the ageing process determines the consistency of the cheese, which gets firmer as it ripens. There are two varieties of Gorgonzola, which differ mainly in their age: the less aged Gorgonzola dolce, which can have a less salty taste and a slightly sweet finish, and the more aged Gorgonzola piccante (also called Gorgonzola naturale, Gorgonzola montagna).

== Protected designation of origin ==
Countries where the term Gorgonzola is protected as a geographical indication: Protected as geographical indication Protected as geographical indication (with limitations)

Under EU law, Gorgonzola has been registered as a protected designation of origin (PDO) since 1996. This means that Gorgonzola sold in the European Union can only be produced in the provinces of Novara, Bergamo, Brescia, Como, Cremona, Cuneo, Lecco, Lodi, Milan, Pavia, Varese, Verbano-Cusio-Ossola and Vercelli, as well as several comuni (municipalities) in the area of Casale Monferrato (province of Alessandria). As a Geographical indication, Gorgonzola produced in parts of Italy is protected in certain countries based on bilateral agreements of the European Union, membership of the Lisbon Agreement or national registration as a certification mark.

Protection of Gorgonzola as a Geographical Indication
Country/Territory	Start of protection	Comments/Exceptions
European Union	21 June 1996	PDO, also valid in Northern Ireland. For Bulgaria, Czechia, France, Hungary, Portugal and Slovakia also protected through the Lisbon agreement.
Algeria	5 May 2014	Within the Lisbon Agreement.
Armenia	1 June 2018	Also protected as Գոռգոնձոլա.
Bosnia and Herzegovina	5 May 2014	Within the Lisbon Agreement, from 1 July 2018, also as part of a bilateral agreement.
Burkina Faso	5 May 2014	Within the Lisbon Agreement.
Canada	21 September 2017	Use of Gorgonzola including the terms "kind", "type", "style", "imitation", etc. is allowed, as well as use by producers using the term before 18 October 2013.
China	2014	Also protected as 戈贡佐拉. From 2014 already protected as a certification mark. Since 1 March 2021, based on a bilateral agreement with the EU.
Colombia	1 August 2013	
Congo	5 May 2014	Within the Lisbon Agreement.
Costa Rica	1 October 2013	
Cuba	5 May 2014	Within the Lisbon Agreement.
Ecuador	1 January 2017	
El Salvador	1 October 2013	
Georgia	1 September 2014	Also protected as გორგონძოლა; and also through the Lisbon agreement.
Gabon	5 May 2014	Within the Lisbon Agreement.
Guatemala	5 August 2015	
Haiti	5 May 2014	Within the Lisbon Agreement.
Honduras	5 August 2015	
Iceland	1 May 2018	
India	2021	Registered as a geographical indication.
Iran	5 May 2014	Within the Lisbon Agreement.
Israel	18 December 2014	Within the Lisbon Agreement.
Japan	1 February 2019	Also protected as ゴルゴンゾーラ.
Kazakhstan	2017	Registered as a geographical indication.
Liechtenstein	27 July 2007	
Mexico	5 May 2014	Within the Lisbon Agreement.
North Macedonia (FYROM)	5 May 2014	Within the Lisbon Agreement.
Moldova	1 April 2013	Since 2014 also through the Lisbon agreement.
Montenegro	1 January 2008	Since 2014 also through the Lisbon agreement.
Nicaragua	5 August 2015	
North Korea	5 May 2014	Within the Lisbon Agreement.
Panama	5 August 2015	
Peru	1 March 2013	Since 2014 also through the Lisbon agreement.
Russia	2017	Registered as a geographical indication.
Serbia	1 February 2010	Since 2014 also through the Lisbon agreement.
Singapore	29 November 2019	
South Africa	10 October 2016	
South Korea	1 July 2011	Also protected as 고르곤졸라 (치즈의 일종).
Switzerland	1 December 2014	
Togo	5 May 2014	Within the Lisbon Agreement.
Tunisia	5 May 2014	Within the Lisbon Agreement.
Ukraine	1 January 2016	Also protected as Ґорґондзоля. Until 31 December 2022, limited use of the term is allowed for similar products.
United Kingdom	31 December 2020	Continuation of EU PDO, valid in England, Scotland and Wales.
Vietnam	1 August 2020	

== Non-European Gorgonzola cheese ==
Over time, production of the cheese outside Europe has led to the generalization of the term Gorgonzola in certain parts of the world, including in Australia. Gorgonzola cheese made outside of the European Union is a family of blue cheeses made from cows' milk and inspired by the original Italian cheese. Whole cow's milk is used, to which starter microbes are added with spores of the mould Penicillium glaucum.

In the United States, the Food and Drug Administration has established what is known as standards of identity (SOIs). SOIs give the US definitions of the basic nature of a food, its ingredients, and its common name. The US Code of Federal Regulations Title 21—Food and Drugs, Chapter I—Food and Drug Administration, Subchapter B—Food for Human Consumption describes a production process for "Gorgonzola" cheese. This SOI, in addition to establishing "Gorgonzola" as the product name for this type of cheese for production in the United States, also applies to any "Gorgonzola" cheese imported from other countries.

== Consumption ==
Combined with other soft cheeses, it is an ingredient of pizza quattro formaggi ('four-cheese pizza'). It is often used as a topping for steak, sometimes as a sauce with port or other sweet wine. It may be melted into a risotto in the final stage of cooking, added to gnocchi or pasta, or served alongside polenta.

Nutrition is as follows: 1 ounce* of gorgonzola contains 100 calories, 9 g of fat, 375 mg of sodium, 1 g of carbohydrate, and 6 g of protein. It contains 5.3 g of saturated fat.

== Literary references ==
James Joyce, in his 1922 novel Ulysses, gives his hero Bloom a lunch of "a glass of Burgundy and a Gorgonzola sandwich". In his 1972 book Ulysses on the Liffey, critic and Joyce scholar Richard Ellmann suggests, "Besides serving as a parable that life breeds corruption. Gorgonzola is probably chosen also because of Dante's adventures with the Gorgon in the Inferno IX. Bloom masters the monster by digesting her."

== See also ==
- List of Italian cheeses
