= Bursa Cantik Pide =

Turkish pizza dish

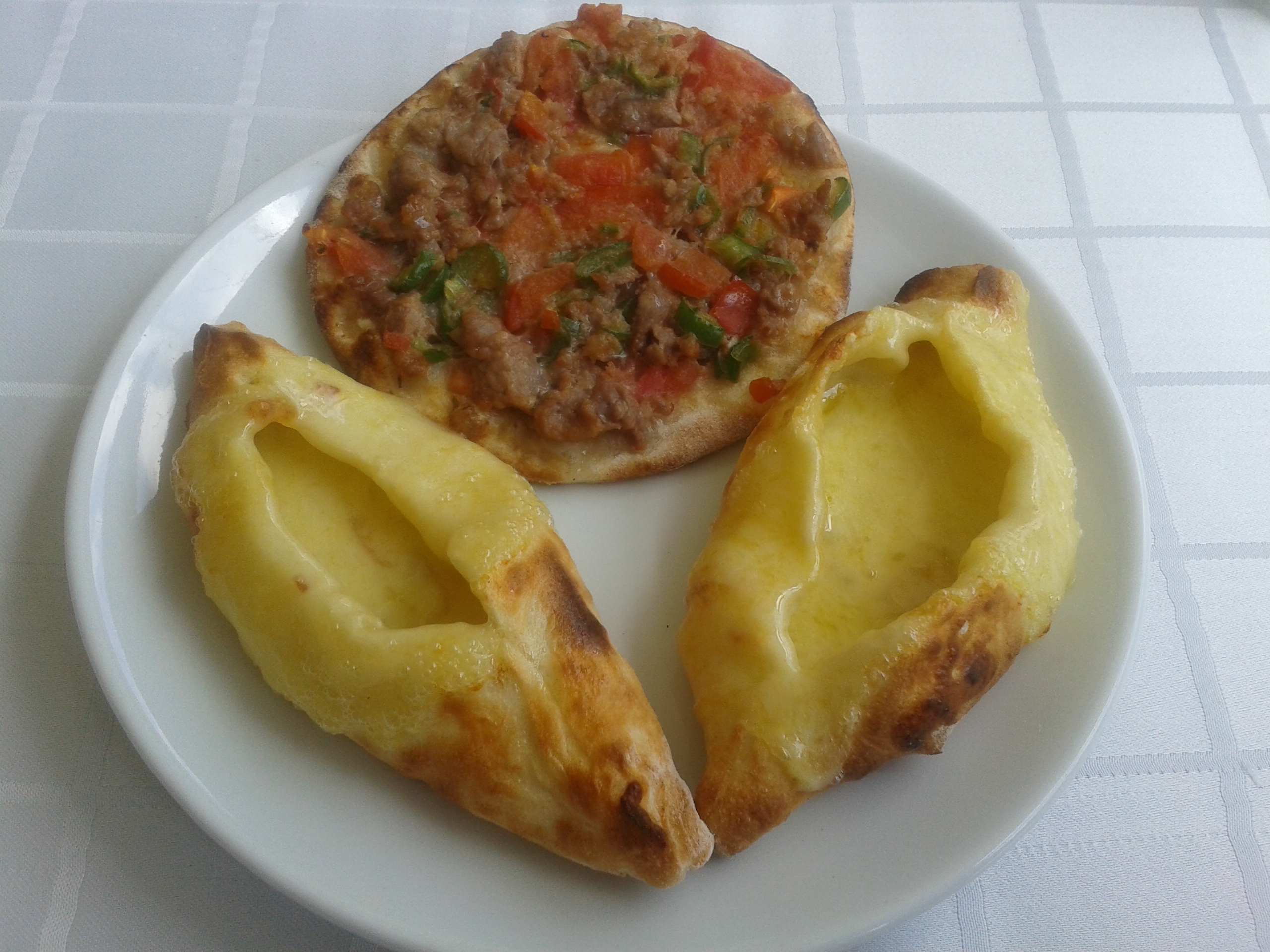
- Course: Main course
- Place of origin: Turkey
- Region or state: Bursa
- Serving temperature: Hot
- Main ingredients: Beef, leek

Bursa cantik pide (Turkish: Bursa cantık pidesi) is a traditional Turkish recipe for a dish of pizza dough filled cheese, ground meat, or other fresh or cured meats, and/or vegetables.

== See also ==
- Karelian pasty
- Khachapuri
- Vatrushka
- Nokul
- Pogača
- Pogácsa
- Pirozhki
- Fatayer
