= Brined cheese =

Cheese that is matured in brine

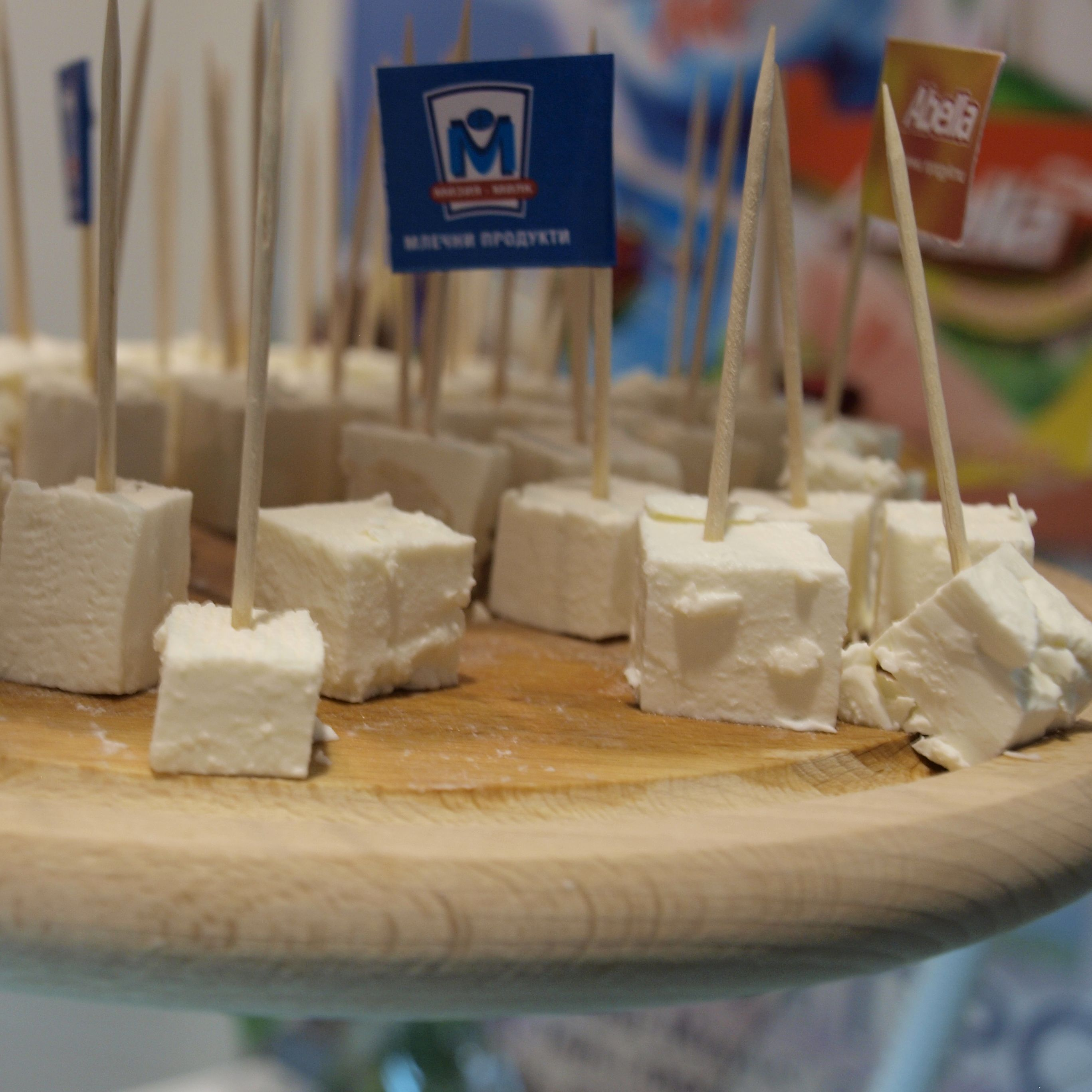
Cubes of Bulgarian sirene white brined cheese

Brined cheese, also sometimes referred to as pickled cheese for some varieties, is cheese that is matured in brine in an airtight or semi-permeable container. This process gives the cheese good stability, inhibiting bacterial growth even in warmer climates. Brined cheeses may be soft or hard, varying in moisture content and in colour and flavour according to the type of milk used. However, all are rindless and generally taste clean, salty and acidic when fresh, developing some piquancy when aged; most are white.

Brine is used in the production of other cheeses, notably washed-rind cheeses, but the term is reserved for cheeses where maturation takes place while submerged in brine.

== List ==
Brined cheese is widely produced and eaten in the Middle East and Mediterranean areas.

Brined cheeses include:

- Akkawi (Levant)
- Balkánský sýr (Czechia and Slovakia)
- Bryndza (Romania, Serbia, Slovakia, Ukraine)
- Chechil (Armenia)
- Cherni Vit (Bulgaria)
- Domiati (Egypt)
- Feta (Greece)
- Ġbejna (Malta)
- Halloumi (Cyprus)
- Hâlûmi (Egypt)
- Lighvan (Iran)
- Mozzarella (Italy)
- Nablusi (Palestine)
- Sirene (Bulgaria)
- Sulguni (Georgia)
- Telemea (Romania)
- Beyaz (Turkey)
- Tzfat (Israel)

== See also ==
- List of cheeses
- Pickling – Procedure of preserving food in brine or vinegar
- Types of cheese
