= Agneau de pré-salé =

French sheep farm produce

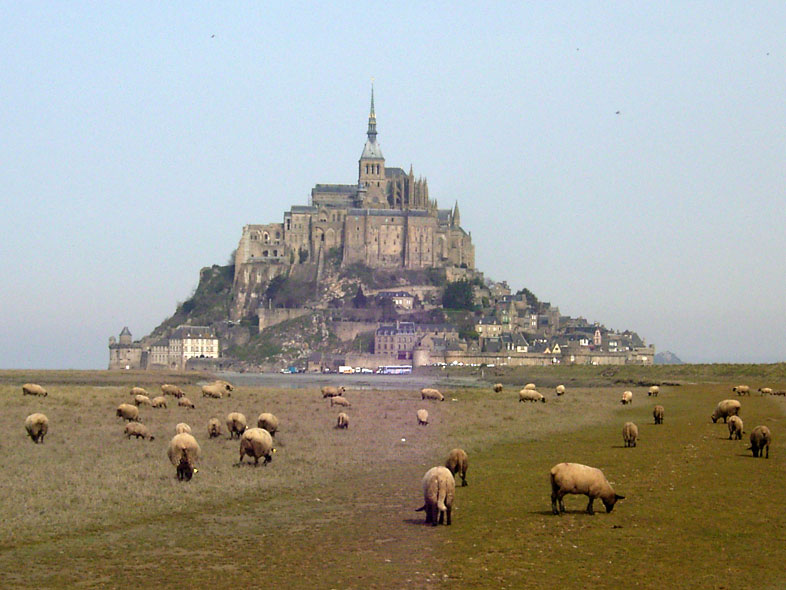
Sheep grazing the salt meadows around Mont Saint-Michel

Agneau de pré-salé (French: 'salt marsh lamb') is a type of lamb which was raised in salt marsh meadows of France (especially Mont Saint-Michel in Normandy and the Bay of the Somme in Picardy), and parts of the UK and the Netherlands. The sheep graze in pastures that are covered in halophyte grasses with a high salinity and iodine content, causing their meat to have a distinct taste considered a delicacy.

In 2006, salt marsh lamb raised in the area around the Bay of the Somme was registered as an Appellation d'origine contrôlée (AOC), followed by registration as an EU Protected Designation of Origin (PDO, French: Appellation d'origine protégée, AOP) in 2013 under the name Prés-salés de la baie de Somme. In the same year also salt marsh lamb raised near Mont-Saint-Michel was registered as PDO under the name: Prés-salés du Mont-Saint-Michel.

Salt marsh lambs can also be found, to a lesser extent, in the United Kingdom and the Netherlands. The Gower Salt Marsh Lamb was protected under UK law as a PDO in 2021, and in 2023 (despite opposition from France) under EU law. The places where salt marsh lamb are also reared in the UK aside from Harlech and the Gower Peninsula in Wales, are the Somerset Levels and Morecambe Bay in England, and the Solway Firth in Scotland.

== See also ==
- French cuisine
