= Teleme cheese =

Semi-soft cheese originating in Turkey

Teleme peyniri
- Other names: Teleme
- Country of origin: Turkey
- Source of milk: Cow, goat, sheep

Teleme or teleme peyniri is a white semi-soft cheese made from cow's, goat's, and sheep's milk, originating in ancient times in the Middle East and Mediterranean.

The origins reach back to the nomadic Yoruk and Turkmen Turkic people who have roamed the mountains and plateaus of southern and southeastern Turkey, and is still produced in the traditional method by goat herders as a major part of their sustenance when they are out on the mountains; from fresh, warm goat's milk acidified and coagulated with ingredients foraged there and then, one of which is the sap/milk of the fig fruit.

== Method ==
The traditional method is to cut a tender shoot of a fig tree with a single unripe fig still attached, warm the goat's milk, and pluck the fig from the shoot, allowing the sap released when the fruit is plucked to fall into the warm milk. The shoot is cut into pieces and the pieces also dropped into the milk. The milk is brought to a bare simmer while stirring for 30 minutes, allowed to cool 30 minutes, the pieces of shoot removed and the curds drained and strained through cheesecloth to produce a soft cheese.

The method was written about by Aristotle.

== See also ==
- Telemea
- Turkish cuisine
