= Telemea =

Romanian cheese traditionally made of sheep's milk

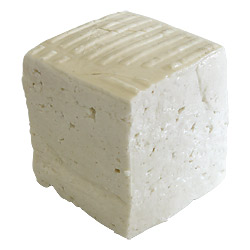
- Country of origin: Romania
- Source of milk: Sheep, cow
- Pasteurised: Traditionally, no
- Texture: soft, semi-soft, brined and creamy
- Certification: Protected designation of origin, Protected geographical indication

Telemea (Romanian pronunciation: [teleˈme̯a]) is the name of a Romanian cheese traditionally made of sheep's milk. Nowadays the term encompasses cheese made out of cow's milk, and in some cases of goat's, or buffalo's milk.

== Description ==
Similar to the Greek feta, but also as in the case of Turkish teleme, Bulgarian or Macedonian sirene, and Serbian sir, telemea can have a higher water content, making it a soft or semi-soft white cheese with a creamy texture and a tangy aftertaste. Alternatively, the cheese is put through an ageing process that makes it crisper, more flavoured and saltier. Cumin seeds are occasionally added for a spicy, nutty flavor. It is used as a table cheese for snacks, in salads, and in a variety of dishes (e.g., omelettes, clătite, plăcinte).

== Production ==
To make Telemea cheese, rennet is added into milk to curdle it. Most commonly, cow's and sheep's milk are used, with goat's and buffalo's being more of a delicacy. The resulting curd is removed and is kept in cheesecloth, pressed overnight, then cut into square pieces. The cheese is then left to mature in brine. This fresh cheese (preserved in brine up to a couple of weeks) has its own name, caș. Subsequently, it is stored in wooden barrels named putini (singular: putină). It can be kept throughout winter in a more concentrated brine, in which case, it is desalted in fresh water before consumption.

== Certification ==
Starting 2004, the Telemea is intended to become a protected traditional speciality product of Romania, and the following types of telemea have sought to be recognized under the PDO or PGI labels:

- Telemea de Argeș
- Telemea de Brașov
- Telemea de Carei
- Telemea de Harghita
- Telemea de Huedin
- Telemea de Ibănești (PDO)
- Telemea de Nucet
- Telemea de Oaş
- Telemea de Sibiu (PGI)
- Telemea de Vâlcea

In 2017, the EU acknowledged Telemea de Ibănești as having Protected designation of origin (PDO), followed by Telemea de Sibiu as having Protected geographical indication (PGI), in 2019.

== See also ==
- Brined cheese – Cheese that is matured in brine
- List of cheeses
- List of sheep milk cheeses
