= Beyaz peynir =

Turkish white cheese, made from unpasteurized milk

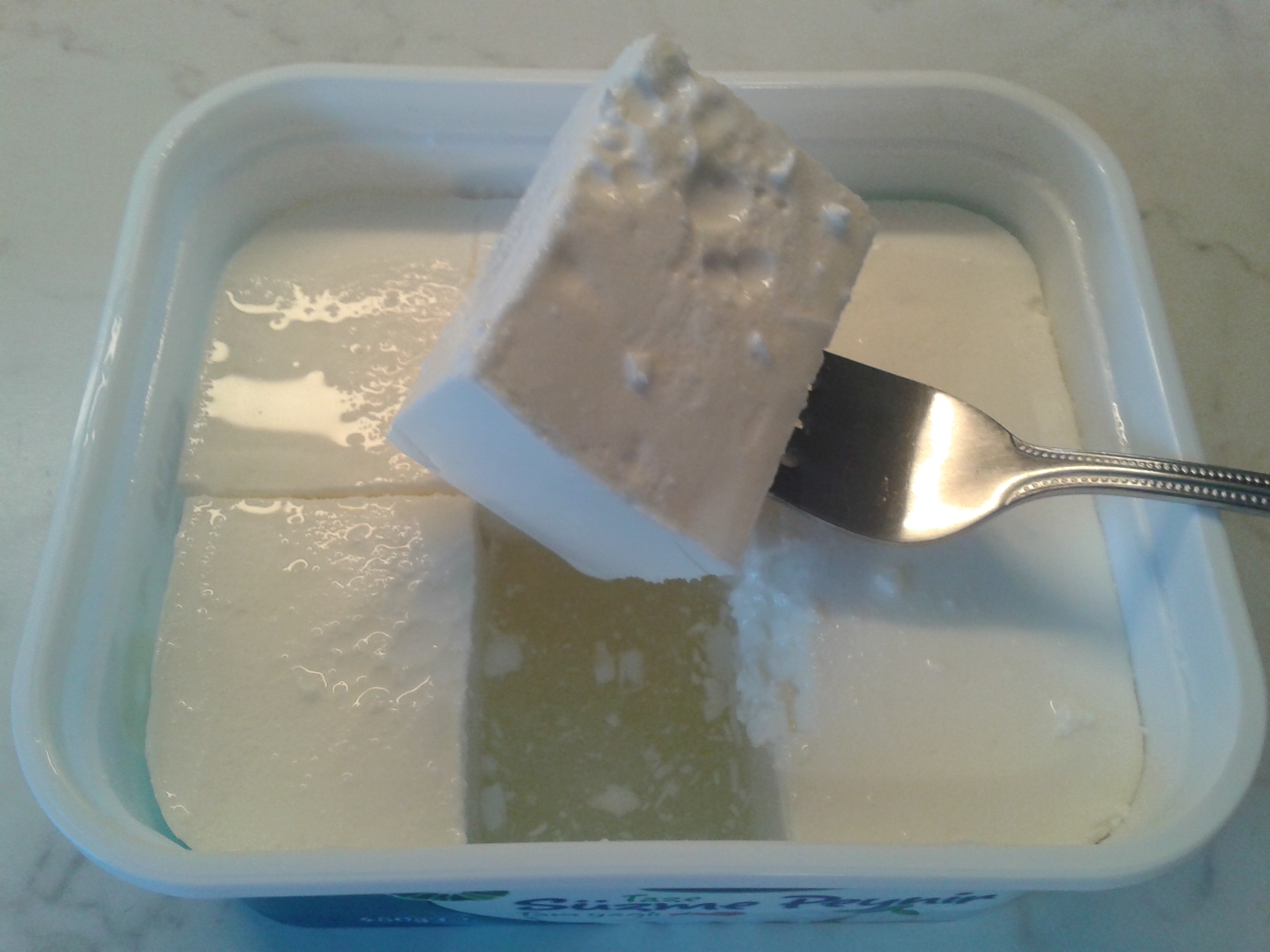
- Country of origin: Turkey
- Source of milk: Sheep, goat, or cow milk
- Texture: Depends on variety

Beyaz peynir (Turkish pronunciation: [beˈjaz pejniɾ], 'white cheese') is a brine cheese produced from unpasteurized sheep, cow or goat milk. The cheese has a slightly grainy appearance and is similar to lighvan, feta, sirene and other Balkan white cheeses. Vegetable rennet is added to the sheep's milk as a clotting agent. Once the curds are produced, they are pressed, chopped, and strained before being cut into blocks that are salted and placed in a brine solution for approximately six months.

Beyaz peynir is produced in a variety of styles, ranging from non-matured cheese curds to a quite strong mature version. It is eaten plain, for example as part of the traditional Turkish breakfast, used in salads, and incorporated into cooked foods such as menemen, börek, gözleme, and pide.

== See also ==
- Turkish cuisine
