= Etli ekmek =

Meat-topped flatbread dish originated in Konya

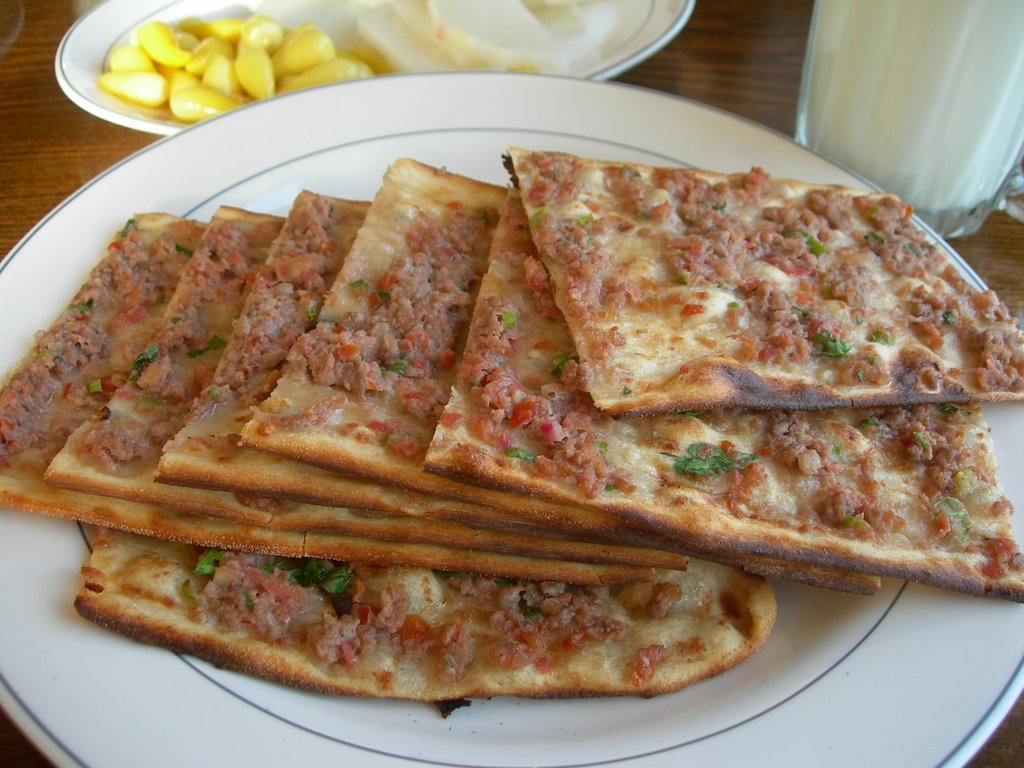
- Etli ekmek
- Type: Flatbread
- Course: Main
- Place of origin: Turkey
- Region or state: Konya
- Serving temperature: Hot
- Main ingredients: Dough, meat

Etli ekmek (lit. 'Bread with meat') is a traditional Turkish dish that originated in Konya, Turkey. It is a type of flatbread topped with minced meat, usually lamb or beef, along with finely chopped vegetables such as onions, tomatoes, and peppers, then baked in a stone oven. Etli ekmek is very popular in the central regions of Turkey and can commonly be found in bakeries and specialized restaurants.

== History ==
Etli ekmek dates back to the Seljuk period in the 13th century. It was originally prepared to serve guests in Konya and surrounding towns, reflecting the culinary traditions of the region.

== Preparation ==
The dough is rolled out thin and topped with a seasoned mixture of minced meat and vegetables. It is traditionally baked in a stone oven, resulting in a thin, crispy flatbread with a flavorful topping. Mutton is commonly used in Konya, giving Etli ekmek its distinctive regional taste.

== Cultural significance ==
Etli ekmek is an important part of Konya's culinary identity and is often served at special occasions, weddings, and to guests, showcasing local hospitality and tradition.

== See also ==
- Lahmacun
- Pide
