= Feta =

Brined white cheese from Greece

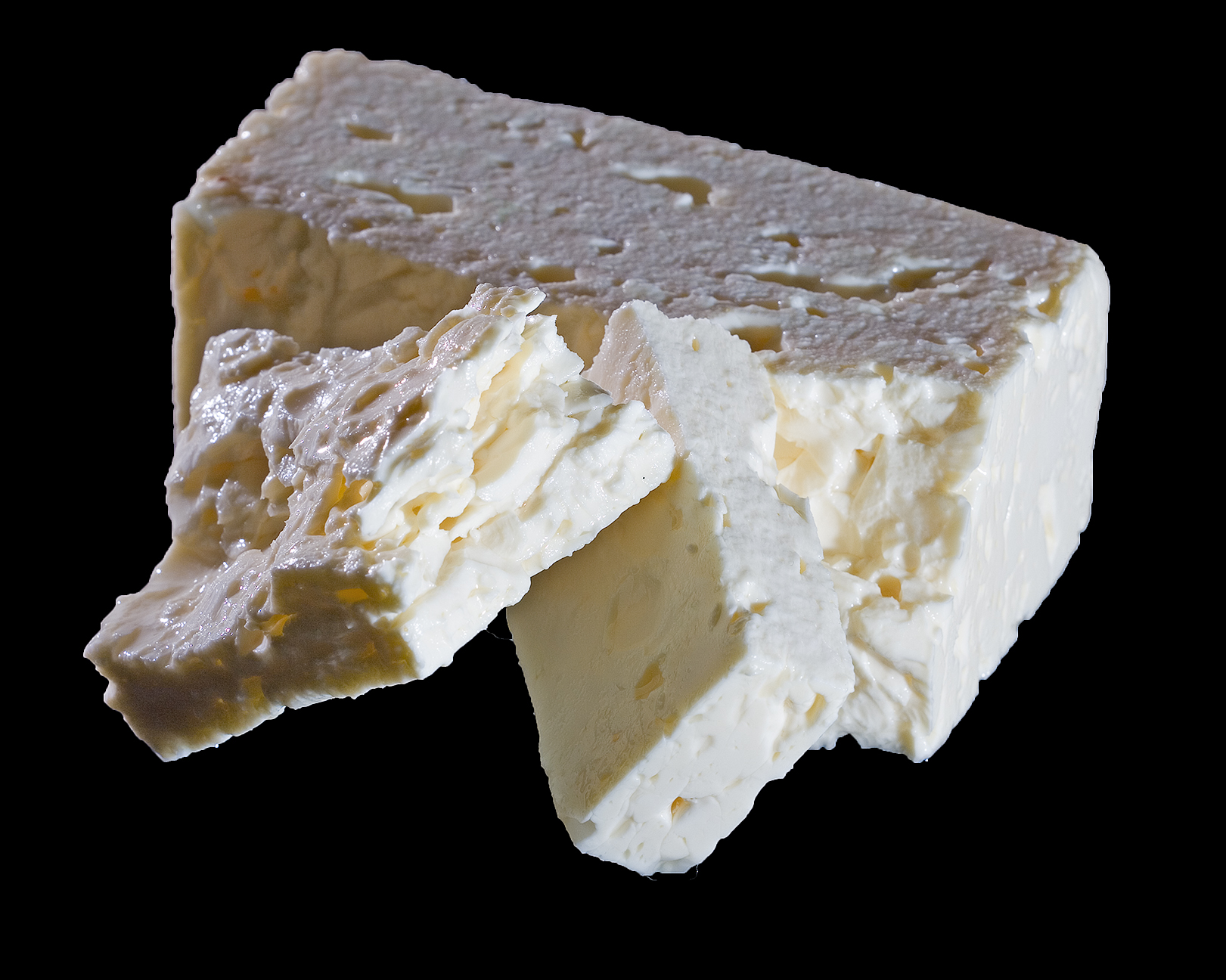
- Country of origin: Greece
- Region: Mainland Greece and Lesbos Prefecture
- Source of milk: Sheep (≥70%) and goat per PDO; similar cheeses may contain cow or buffalo milk
- Pasteurized: Depends on variety
- Texture: Depends on variety
- Aging time: Three months minimum
- Certification: PDO: 2002

Feta (/ˈfɛtə/ FET-ə; Greek: φέτα [ˈfeta]) is a Greek white brined cheese made from sheep's milk or from a mixture of sheep and goat's milk. It is soft, with small or no holes, and no skin. Crumbly with a slightly grainy texture, it is formed into large blocks and aged in brine. Its flavour is tangy and salty, ranging from mild to sharp. Feta is used in salads, such as Greek salad, and in pastries, notably the filo-based Greek dishes spanakopita 'spinach pie', and tyropita 'cheese pie'. It is often served with olive oil or olives, and sprinkled with aromatic herbs such as oregano. It can also be served cooked (often grilled), as part of a sandwich, in omelettes, and many other dishes.

Since 2002, feta has been a protected designation of origin (PDO) in the European Union. EU legislation and similar legislation in 25 other countries limits the name feta to cheeses produced in the traditional way in mainland Greece and Lesbos Prefecture, which are made from sheep milk, or from a mixture of sheep milk and up to 30% goat milk from the same area.

Similar white brined cheeses are made traditionally in the Balkans, Cyprus, around the Black Sea, and in West Asia. Outside the EU, the name feta is often used generically for these cheeses.

== Naming ==
The Greek word féta (φέτα) comes from the Italian fetta 'slice', which in turn is derived from the Latin offa 'morsel, piece'. The word feta became widespread as a name for the cheese only in the 19th century; probably referring to the cheese being cut to pack it in barrels. The same cheese can be referred to differently within Greece itself. In Thessaloniki, for example, it is referred to as tyrí (τυρί), which is the general word for 'cheese' in the south of the country.

For many consumers outside Greece, the word feta is a generic term for a white, crumbly cheese aged in brine. Production of the cheese first began in the Eastern Mediterranean and around the Black Sea. Over time, production expanded to countries including Denmark, France, Germany, Italy, the United Kingdom and the United States, often partly or wholly of cow milk, and is (or was) sometimes also called feta. In the United States, most cheese sold under the name feta is American and made from cow milk.

== Description ==
The EU PDO for feta requires a maximum moisture of 56%, a minimum fat content in dry matter of 43%, and a pH that usually ranges from 4.4 to 4.6. Production of the EU PDO feta is traditionally categorized into firm and soft varieties. The firm variety is tangier and considered higher in quality. The soft variety is almost soft enough to be spreadable, mostly used in pies and sold at a cheaper price. Slicing feta produces some amount of trímma, "crumble", which is also used for pies (not being sellable, trímma is usually given away for free upon request).

High-quality feta should have a creamy texture when sampled, and aromas of ewe's milk, butter, and yoghurt. In the mouth it is tangy, slightly salty, and mildly sour, with a spicy finish that recalls pepper and ginger, as well as a hint of sweetness. According to the specification of the Geographical Indication, the biodiversity of the land coupled with the special breeds of sheep and goats used for milk is what gives feta cheese a specific aroma and flavor.

== Production ==
Traditionally (and legally within the EU and other territories where it is protected), feta is produced using only whole sheep milk, or a blend of sheep and goat milk (with a maximum of 30% goat milk). The milk may be pasteurized or not, but most producers now use pasteurized milk. If pasteurized milk is used, a starter culture of micro-organisms is added to replace those naturally present in raw milk that are killed in pasteurization. These organisms are required for acidity and flavour development.

When the pasteurized milk has cooled to approximately 35 °C (95 °F), rennet is added and the casein is left to coagulate. The compacted curds are then chopped up and placed in a special mould or a cloth bag that allows the whey to drain. After several hours, the curd is firm enough to cut up and salt; salinity will eventually reach approximately 3%, when the salted curds are placed (depending on the producer and the area of Greece) in metal vessels or wooden barrels and allowed to infuse for several days.

After the dry-salting of the cheese is complete, aging or maturation in brine (a 7% salt in water solution) takes several weeks at room temperature and a further minimum of 2 months in a refrigerated high-humidity environment—as before, either in wooden barrels or metal vessels, depending on the producer (the more traditional barrel aging is said to impart a unique flavour). The containers are then shipped to supermarkets where the cheese is cut and sold directly from the container; alternatively blocks of standardized weight are packaged in sealed plastic cups with some brine.

Feta dries relatively quickly even when refrigerated. If stored for longer than a week, it should be kept in brine or lightly salted milk.

== Geographical indication ==
Countries where the term "feta" is protected as a geographical indication Country of origin (Greece) Protected as geographical indication Protected as geographical indication (with limitations)

Since 2002, feta/φέτα has been a protected designation of origin (PDO) product within the European Union. According to the relevant EU legislation (applicable within the EU and Northern Ireland), as well as similar UK legislation only those cheeses produced in a traditional way in particular areas of Greece, which are made from sheep milk, or from a mixture of sheep milk and up to 30% of goat milk from the same area, can be called feta. In several other countries, the term feta has since been protected. An overview is shown in the table below.

Protection of feta/Φέτα as a geographical indication
Country/territory	Start of protection	Comments/Exceptions
European Union	15 October 2002	PDO, also valid in Northern Ireland
Argentina	1 May 2026	Until 7 years after entry into force, use of the term is allowed for similar products by existing producers provided the geographical origin is also indicated
Armenia	26 January 2018	Also protected as Ֆետա
Bosnia and Herzegovina	18 February 2016	
Brazil	1 May 2026	Until 7 years after entry into force, use of the term is allowed for similar products by existing producers provided the geographical origin is also indicated
Canada	21 September 2017	Use of feta including the terms "kind", "type", "style", "imitation" etc. is allowed, as well as use by producers using the term before 18 October 2013.
Chile	1 February 2025	Until 1 February 2031 limited use of the term is allowed for similar products by existing producers provided the geographical origin is also indicated
China	1 March 2021	Also protected as 菲达奶酪. Until 1 March 2029 limited use of the term is allowed for similar products by existing producers provided the geographical origin is also indicated
Colombia	1 August 2013	
Costa Rica	1 October 2013	
El Salvador	1 October 2013	
Ecuador	1 January 2017	
Georgia	1 April 2012	Also protected as ფეტა.
Guatemala	1 December 2013	
Honduras	1 August 2013	
Iceland	1 May 2018	
Japan	1 February 2019	Also protected as フェタ.
Kosovo	1 April 2016	
Liechtenstein	27 July 2007	
Moldova	1 April 2013	
Montenegro	1 January 2008	
New Zealand	1 May 2024	Until 1 May 2033 use of the term is allowed for similar products by existing producers provided no confusion exists regarding the geographical origin.
Nicaragua	1 August 2013	
Panama	1 August 2013	
Paraguay	1 May 2026	Until 7 years after entry into force, use of the term is allowed for similar products by existing producers provided the geographical origin is also indicated
Peru	1 March 2013	
Serbia	1 February 2010	
Singapore	29 June 2019	
South Africa	1 November 2016	
South Korea	14 May 2011	Also protected as 페따.
Switzerland	1 December 2014	
Ukraine	31 December 2015	Also protected as Фета. As of 31 December 2022, limited use of the term is no longer allowed for similar products
United Kingdom	31 December 2020	Continuation of EU PDO, valid in England, Scotland and Wales
Uruguay	1 May 2026	Until 7 years after entry into force, use of the term is allowed for similar products by existing producers provided the geographical origin is also indicated
Uzbekistan	1 March 2026	
Vietnam	1 August 2020	

=== Effect of certification ===
Prior to Greece's pursuit of a PDO for its feta, there was long-standing production outside of Greece in three member states: Germany, Denmark and France, and in certain countries (e.g., Denmark) feta was perceived as a generic term, while it was perceived as a designation of origin in others (e.g., Greece), with the centre of production and consumption taking place in Greece. Greece first requested the registration of feta as a designation of origin in the EU in 1994, which was approved in 1996 by commission regulation (EC) No 1107/96 The decision was appealed to the Court of Justice of the European Union (CJEU) by Denmark, France and Germany, which annulled the decision as the Commission did not evaluate sufficiently whether or not Feta had become a generic term.

After that decision, the European Commission reevaluated registering feta as a PDO, taking into account production in other EU countries and re-registered feta as a PDO in Commission Regulation (EC) No 1829/2002. This decision was appealed again at CJEU by Denmark and Germany. In 2005, the CJEU upheld the Commission Regulation. It indicated that indeed the term was generic in some EU countries and that production also took place outside Greece, but that on the other hand the geographical region in Greece was well defined and that even non-Greek producers often appealed to the status of Feta as a Greek product through the choice of packaging.

Although the island of Cephalonia also traditionally produces feta, the island was left out of the definition of the protected designation of origin. While this does not play a role for consumers in Greece, dairies lose out in sales abroad because they do not produce real "feta" and have to accept price reductions.

The European Commission gave other nations five years to find a new name for their feta cheese or stop production. Because of the decision by the European Union, Danish dairy company Arla Foods changed the name of its white cheese products to Apetina, which is also the name of an Arla food brand established in 1991. The British cheese Yorkshire Feta was renamed to Fine Fettle Yorkshire. When needed to describe an imitation feta, names such as "salad cheese" and "Greek-style cheese" are used.

The EU included feta in several Associations Agreements, Free Trade Agreements and agreements on the recognition of Geographical Indications, which led to the expansion of protection of the term "feta". Exporters from the EU to foreign markets outside the territories covered by these agreements are not subject to the European Commission rules. As such, the non-Greek EU cheese sold abroad is often labeled as feta.

In 2013, an agreement was reached with Canada (CETA) in which Canadian feta manufacturers retained their rights to continue producing feta while new entrants to the market would label the product "feta-style/type cheese". In other markets such as the United States, Australia, New Zealand and elsewhere, full generic usage of the term "feta" continues, and was one of several original name issues preventing the signing of an Australia–EU free trade deal.

== History ==
They make a great many cheeses; it is a pity they are so salty. I saw great warehouses full of them, some in which the brine, or salmoria as we would say was two feet deep, and the large cheeses were floating in it. Those in charge told me that the cheeses could not be preserved in any other way, being so rich. They do not know how to make butter. They sell a great quantity to the ships that call there: it was astonishing to see the number of cheeses taken on board our own galley.

— Pietro Casola, 15th-century Italian traveller to Crete

Cheese made from sheep and goat milk has been common in the Eastern Mediterranean since ancient times. In Bronze Age Canaan, cheese was perhaps among the salted foods shipped by sea in ceramic jars and so rennet-coagulated white cheeses similar to feta may have been shipped in brine, but there is no direct evidence for this.

In Greece, the earliest documented reference to cheese production dates back to the 8th century BC and the technology used to make cheese from sheep-goat milk is similar to the technology used by Greek shepherds today to produce feta. In the Odyssey, Homer describes how Polyphemus makes cheese and dry-stores it in wicker racks, though he says nothing about brining—resulting perhaps, according to Paul S. Kindstedt, in a rinded cheese similar to modern pecorino and caprino rather than feta. On the other hand, E. M. Antifantakis and G. Moatsou state that Polyphemus' cheese was "undoubtedly the ancestor of modern Feta". Origins aside, cheese produced from sheep-goat milk was a common food in ancient Greece and an integral component of later Greek gastronomy.

The first unambiguous documentation of preserving cheese in brine appears in Cato the Elder's De Agri Cultura (2nd century BC), though the practice was surely much older. It is also described in the 10th-century Geoponica. Feta cheese, specifically, is recorded by Psellos in the 11th century under the name prósphatos (Greek πρόσφατος 'recent, fresh'), and was produced by Cretans. In the late 15th century, an Italian visitor to Candia, Pietro Casola, describes the marketing of feta, as well as its storage in brine. Feta cheese, along with milk and sheep meat, is the principal source of income for shepherds in northwestern Greece.

== Nutrition ==
Feta (typical)
Nutritional value per 100 g (3.5 oz)
- Energy: 1,103 kJ (264 kcal)
- Carbohydrates: 4 g
- Fat: 21 g
- Protein: 14 g
Vitamins and minerals
Vitamins	Quantity %DV^{†}
Vitamin A	422 IU
Riboflavin (B2)	65% 0.84 mg
Pantothenic acid (B5)	19% 0.97 mg
Vitamin B6	25% 0.42 mg
Vitamin B12	71% 1.7 μg
Minerals	Quantity %DV^{†}
Calcium	38% 493 mg
Phosphorus	27% 337 mg
Sodium	49% 1116 mg
Zinc	26% 2.9 mg
- ^{†}Percentages estimated using US recommendations for adults.

Feta has significant amounts of calcium and phosphorus; however, feta is higher in water and thus lower in fat and food energy than aged cheeses like parmigiano-reggiano or cheddar. The cheese may contain beneficial probiotics.

Feta, as a sheep dairy product, contains up to 1.9% conjugated linoleic acid (CLA), which is about 0.8% of its fat content.

Feta cheese is very high in salt, at over 400 mg sodium per 100 calories.

== Similar cheeses ==
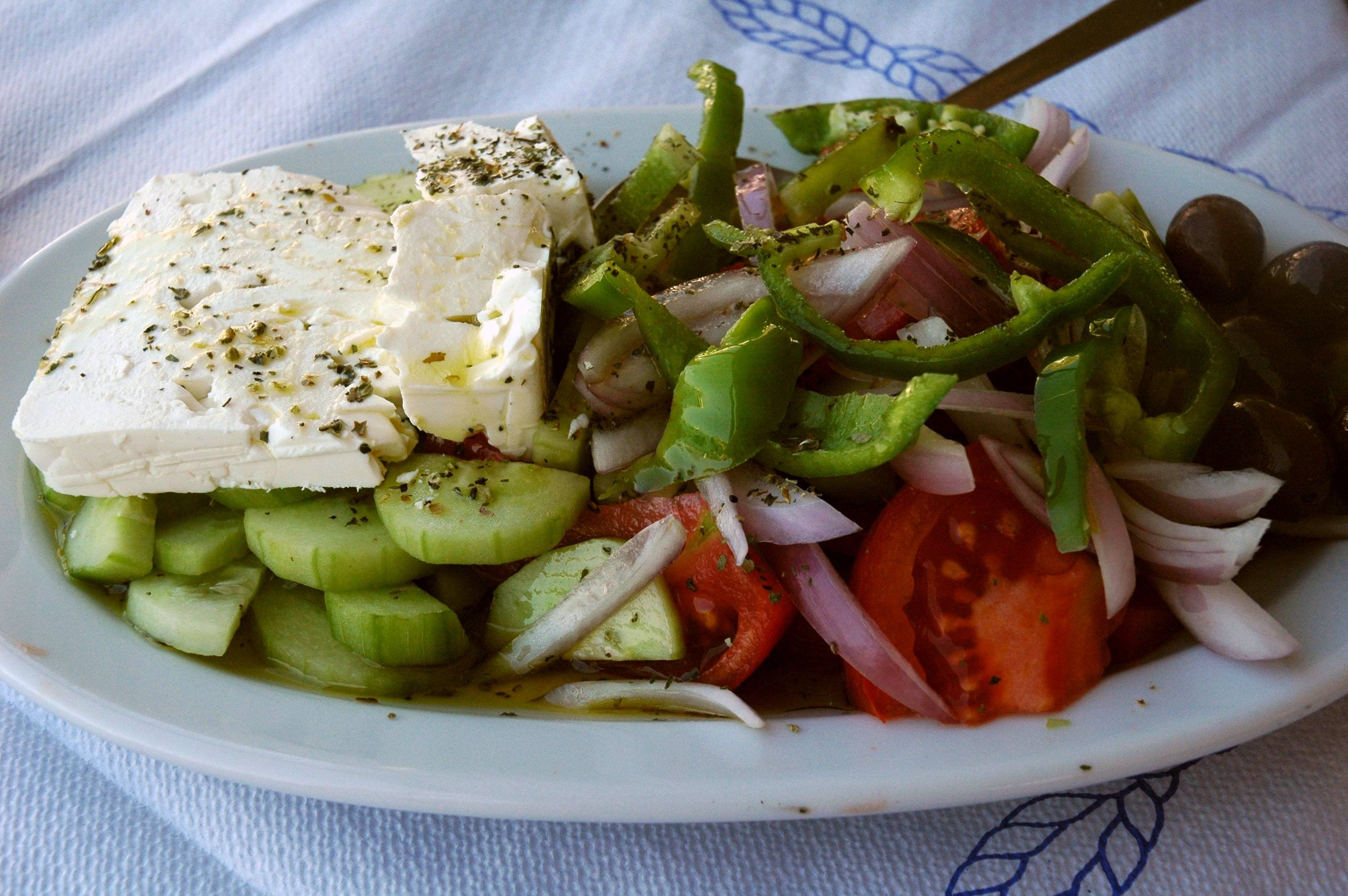
A Greek salad with a slice of feta

Similar cheeses can be found in other countries, such as:

- Albania (Urdha or djathë i bardhë, lit. 'white cheese')
- Armenia (Չանախ chanakh - cheese made in a chan, a type of crock)
- Azerbaijan (ağ pendir, lit. 'white cheese')
- Bosnia (Travnički/Vlašićki sir, lit. "cheese from Vlašić/Travnik")
- Bulgaria (бяло сирене, bjalo sirene, lit. "white cheese")
- Canada (feta style cheese, or simply feta for those companies producing the cheese prior to October 2013)
- Cyprus (χαλίτζια, halitzia)
- Czech Republic (balkánský sýr, lit. "Balkan cheese")
- Egypt (domiati)
- Finland (salaattijuusto, "salad cheese")
- Georgia (ყველი, kveli, lit. "cheese")
- Germany (Schafskäse, "sheep cheese")
- Hungary (juhtúró, "sheep cheese")
- Iran (Lighvan cheese; پنیر لیقوان panīr-e līghvān)
- Israel (gvinat rosh hanikra, lit. "Rosh Hanikra cheese", sometimes called abroad 'Israeli feta'.)
- Italy (casu 'e fitta Sardinia)
- Lebanon (gibneh bulgharieh, lit. "Bulgarian cheese")
- North Macedonia (сирење, sirenje)
- Palestine and Jordan (Nabulsi cheese; جبنة نابلسية, and Akkawi; عكاوي)
- Poland (bryndza)
- Romania (brânză telemea)
- Russia (брынза, brynza)
- Serbia (сир, sir as a common name; сирење, sirenje in South, including Kosovo Serb; and brinza in north and east Serbia within Slovak and Aromanian populations)
- Slovakia (bryndza and Balkánsky syr, lit. "Balkan cheese")
- Spain (Queso de Burgos, lit. "Burgos cheese")
- Sudan (gibna beyda, lit. "white cheese")
- Tajikistan (панир, panir, lit. "cheese")
- Turkey (beyaz peynir, lit. "white cheese")
- Ukraine (бринза, brynza)
- United Kingdom ("salad cheese")

== See also ==
- List of ancient dishes and foods
- List of cheeses

== General and cited references ==
- Adams, Alexis Marie (2016). "feta". In Donnelly, Catherine W. (ed.). The Oxford Companion to Cheese. Oxford: Oxford University Press. pp. 269–271. ISBN 978-0199330881.
- Antifantakis, E. M.; Moatsou, G. (2006). "2 Feta and Other Balkan Cheeses". In Tamime, Adnan (ed.). Brined Cheeses. Oxford: Blackwell Publishing Ltd. pp. 43–76. ISBN 9781405124607.
- Babiniotis, George D. (1998). Λεξικό της νέας ελληνικής γλώσσας με σχόλια για τη σωστή χρήση των λέξεων Λεξικό της Νέας Ελληνικής Γλώσσας (in Greek). Athens: Kentro Leksikologias. ISBN 9789608619005.
- Barthélemy, Roland; Sperat-Czar, Arnaud (2004). Cheeses of the World. London: Hachette Illustrated. ISBN 978-1-84-430115-7.
- Bintsis, Thomas; Alichanidis, Efstathios (2018). "Cheeses from Greece". In Papademas, Photis; Bintsis, Thomas (eds.). Global Cheesemaking Technology: Cheese Quality and Characteristics. Hoboken, NJ: John Wiley & Sons, Ltd. pp. 180–181. ISBN 9781119046158.
- Dalby, Andrew (1996). Siren Feasts: A History of Food and Gastronomy in Greece. London and New York: Routledge. ISBN 9781134969852.
- Kindstedt, Paul S. (2012). Cheese and Culture: A History of Cheese and Its Place in Western Civilization. White River Junction, VT: Chelsea Green Publishing. ISBN 978-1603584128.
- Harbutt, Juliet (2006). The World Encyclopedia of Cheese. London: Hermes House. ISBN 9781843099604.
- Hatziminaoglou, Y.; Boyazoglou, J. (2004). "The goat in ancient civilisations: from the Fertile Crescent to the Aegean Sea". Small Ruminant Research. 51 (2): 123–129. doi:10.1016/j.smallrumres.2003.08.006.
- "Comprehensive Economic and Trade Agreement (CETA)". Official Journal of the European Union. 2017.
- Polychroniadou-Alichanidou, Anna (2004). "13: Traditional Greek Feta". In Hui, Y.H.; Meunier-Goddik, Lisbeth; Josephsen, Jytte; Nip, Wai-Kit; Stanfield, Peggy S. (eds.). Handbook of Food and Beverage Fermentation Technology. New York: Marcel Dekker, Inc. pp. 283–299. ISBN 9780824751227.
- Prandini, Aldo; Sigolo, Samantha; Piva, Gianfranco (2011). "A comparative study of fatty acid composition and CLA concentration in commercial cheeses". Journal of Food Composition and Analysis. 24 (1): 55–61. doi:10.1016/j.jfca.2010.04.004.
- Razionale, Vince (2016). "Homer". In Donnelly, Catherine W. (ed.). The Oxford Companion to Cheese. Oxford: Oxford University Press. p. 360. ISBN 978-0199330881.
