= Argentine cuisine =

Culinary traditions of Argentina

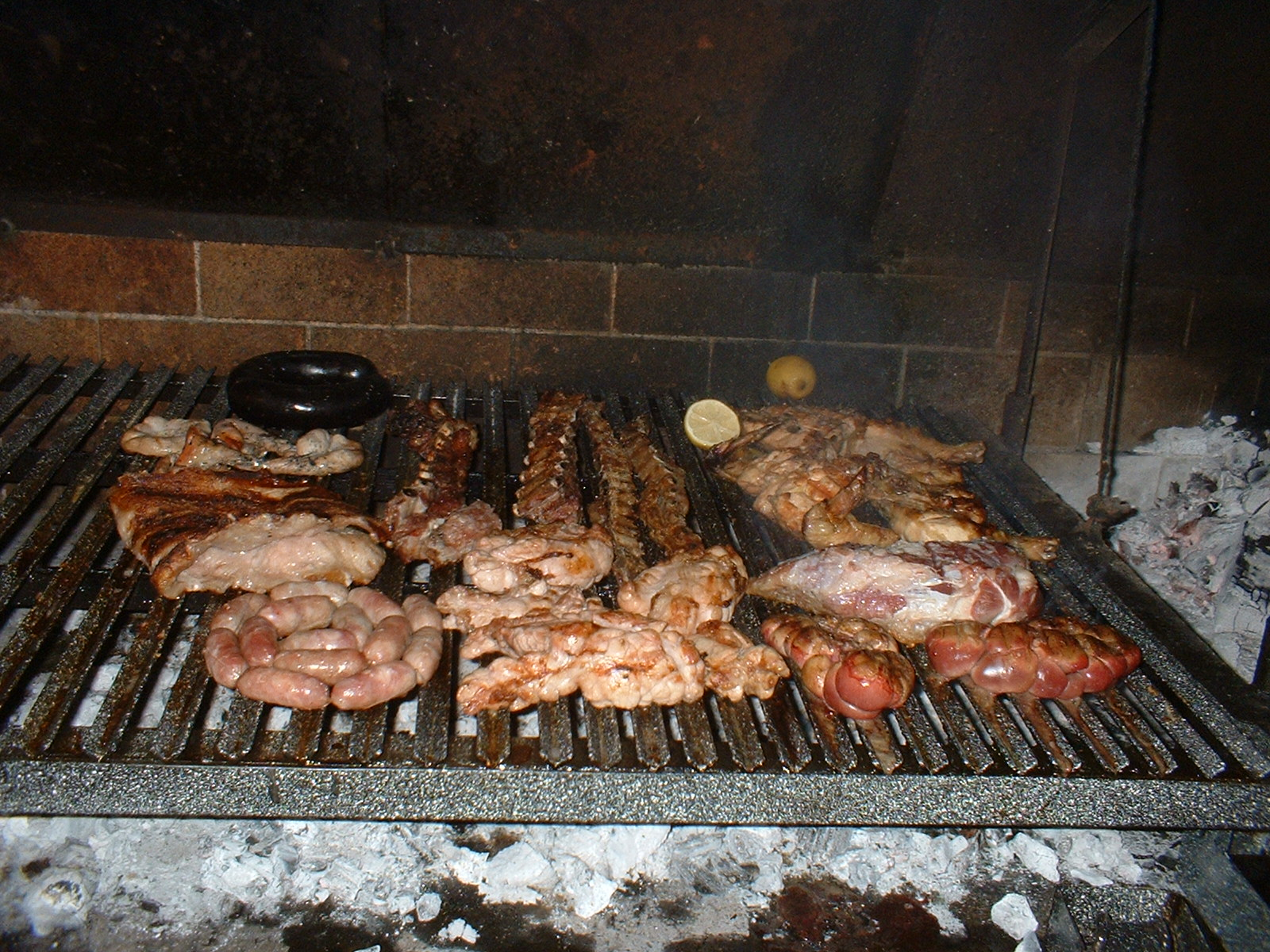
Typical Argentine asado (grill)

Argentine cuisine blends elements from the Indigenous peoples of Argentina who focused on ingredients such as humita, potatoes, cassava, peppers, tomatoes, beans, and yerba mate, and from Spanish cuisine brought during the colonial period. These were enriched by Italian and Spanish immigrants during the 19th and 20th centuries, who incorporated many of their food customs and dishes such as pizza, pasta and Spanish tortillas.

Beef is a major part of the Argentine diet due to its vast production in the country's plains. Argentine annual consumption of beef has averaged 100 kg (220 lb) per capita, approaching 180 kg (400 lb) per capita during the 19th century; consumption averaged 67.7 kg (149 lb) in 2007.

Beyond asado (the Argentine version of barbecue), no other dish more genuinely matches the national identity. Nevertheless, the country's vast area, and its cultural diversity, have led to a local cuisine of various dishes.

The great immigratory waves consequently left a lasting influence in the Argentine cuisine; after all, Argentina was the second country in the world with the most immigrants with 6.6 million, only second to the United States with 27 million, and ahead of other immigratory receptor countries such as Canada, Brazil, Australia, and others.

Argentine people have a reputation for their love of eating. Social gatherings are commonly centred on sharing a meal. Invitations to have dinner at home are generally viewed as a symbol of friendship, warmth, and integration. Sunday family lunch is considered the most significant meal of the week, whose highlights often include asado or pasta.

Another feature of Argentine cuisine is the preparation of homemade food such as French fries, patties, and pasta to celebrate a special occasion, to meet friends, or to honour someone. Homemade food is also seen as a way to show affection.

Argentine restaurants include a great variety of cuisines, prices, and flavours. Large cities tend to host everything from high-end international cuisine to bodegons (inexpensive traditional hidden taverns), less stylish restaurants, and bars and canteens offering a range of dishes at affordable prices.

== History ==
Amerindians lived in Argentina thousands of years before European explorers arrived, mostly living off hunting, gathering, and fishing. The most common crops at this time were maize, potatoes, common beans, quinoa, and squash.

The Argentinian native people could be divided into three groups based on their main modality of acquiring food:

- Hunters and gatherers who inhabited the Patagonia, Pampa, and Chaco regions.
- Farmers in the north-western, Cuyo, and Cordoba's mountain regions who mostly grew squash, melons, and sweet potatoes. These groups had great influence from Andean-Incan tradition.
- Farmers in the Mesopotamia plains who belonged to the Guaraní culture.

Spanish settlers came to Argentina in 1536 and began building chacras where Amerindians would work to harvest the food. The arrival of Europeans brought Argentina into the Columbian Exchange, with ingredients from the Old World such as wheat, grapevine, figs, and several kinds of fruits being introduced to the country for the first time. It was also during the Spanish colonial period that cattle, goat, and pig farming were first introduced to Argentina, forming the foundation of the large Argentine beef industry.

Between 1853 and 1955, 6.6 million immigrants came to live in Argentina from Europe (especially from Italy, Wales, Germany and Switzerland), the Near and Middle East, Russia and Japan. They contributed to the development of Argentine cuisine by encouraging the production of a wider variety of foods. They also bought lands where they built chacras and encouraged the growth of farming. By this point, Argentina was the country with most immigrants only second to the United States.

During the 19th century, social standing was not associated with access to food. The price of beef, fish, and bird meats was cheap and accessible. However, grains and wheat was scarce so bread was very expensive. Some of the most common dishes during this time were soups with pork chunks, cooked partridge with legumes, spinach bread, beef slices, and lamb stew. The most prominent spices were garlic, parsley, and pepper.

By the turn of the century, Argentinian cuisine was limited as several ingredients had shortages. As further immigration began in the early 1900s, eating habits began to shift. Most of these immigrants came from Italy and Spain, the Italians introducing pizza, as well as a variety of pasta dishes, including spaghetti and lasagna. British, German, Jewish, and other immigrants also settled in Argentina, all bringing their styles of cooking and foods with them. The British brought tea, starting the tradition of teatime.

At this time, Italian cuisine began to become a more significant part of the cuisine. The neighborhood of La Boca, Buenos Aires, was the first big Italian hub, and from here plenty of traditionally Italian ingredients and eating habits expanded across the country. Different kinds of pastas such as long noodles or tallarines, gnocchi, ravioli, and cannelloni filled with ricotta cheese became popular along with pizza, fainá (Argentinian version of the traditional Italian farinata), and milanesas. Different ways of preparing dishes were also adopted from Italian immigrants. These included the preparation of ice cream, fish, niño envuelto and shellfish. Spanish immigrants also left their mark, popularizing eating dry nuts, tomato sauce, pesto, olives, and olive oil. Additionally, deli stores started to incorporate traditional Iberian hams and sausages and great varieties of cheeses yet these were more limited. They were also mainly responsible for the massive diffusion of wine consumption, among some other habits. This occurred at the same time that other global products began arriving to Argentina such as saffron, cod, different varieties of beans, chickpeas, additional spices, chocolates, and tea.

== Typical foods ==
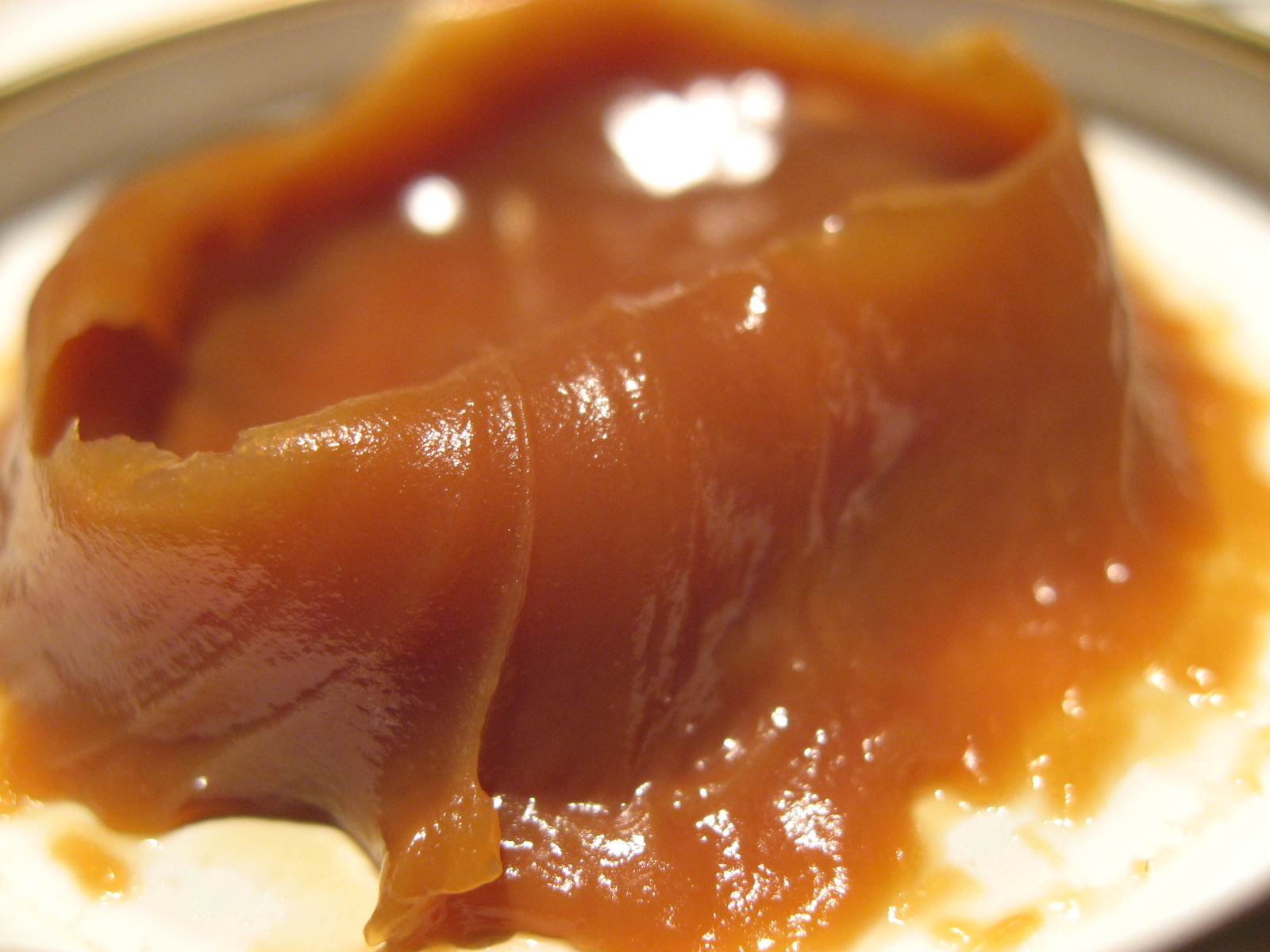
Dulce de leche, a popular spread used to fill cakes and pancakes, eaten over toast, and as an ice cream flavour

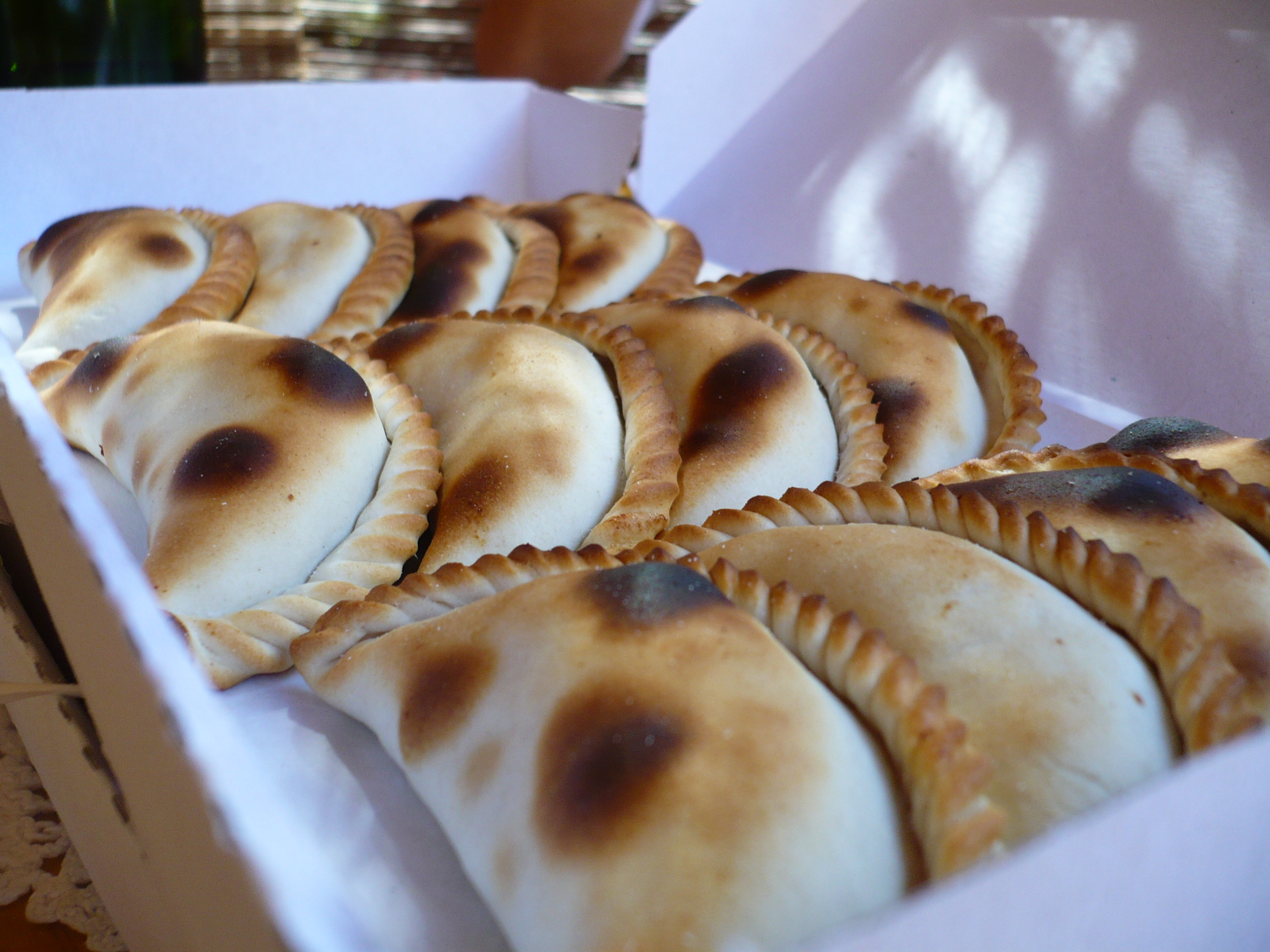
Boxed empanadas

Most regions of Argentina are known for their beef-oriented diet. Grilled meat from the asado (barbecue) is a staple, with steak and beef ribs especially common. The term asado itself refers to long strips of flank-cut beef ribs.

Popular items such as chorizo (pork sausage), morcilla (blood sausage), cinchonines (chitterlings), mollejas (sweetbread), and other parts of the animal are also enjoyed.

In Patagonia, however, lamb and chivito (goat) are eaten more frequently than beef. Whole lambs and goats are traditionally cooked over an open fire in a technique known as asado a la estaca.

The most common condiment for asado is chimichurri, a sauce of herbs, garlic and vinegar. Unlike other preparations, Argentines do not include chilli in their version of chimichurri, but it does include a still-spicy, but milder form of red pepper, ají molido.

Breaded and fried meats (milanesas) are used as snacks, in sandwiches, or eaten warm with mashed potatoes, purée. Empanadas, small pastries of meat, cheese, sweet corn, and many other fillings, are a common sight at parties and picnics, or as starters to a meal. They also vary in their looks, since they are folded with a traditional decorative edging called repulgue. The repulgue is not just aesthetic, but also serves as a way to identify the flavor of each empanada since they are traditionally ordered in dozens where people mix and match flavors. Empanadas are one of the most important staples of this country due to the wide array of varieties.

The empanadas seen in Argentina today originate from a Spanish dish from the fifteenth century where travelers used easy-to-carry bread and filled it with a variety of ingredients. Eventually it evolved into a popular gastronomic item and spread across the world. Variations of empanadas both inside and outside of Argentina include the empanada gallega (Galician empanada), a large round meat pie made most commonly with tuna and mackerel (caballa in Spanish).

Vegetables and salads are also eaten by Argentines; tomatoes, onions, lettuce, eggplants, squashes, and zucchini are common side dishes.

Italian staples, such as pizza and pasta, are eaten as commonly as beef. Fideos (noodles), tallarines (fettuccine and tagliatelle), and ñoquis (gnocchi) are traditionally served on the 29th day of the month. Ravioles and canelones (cannelloni) can be bought freshly made in many establishments in the larger cities. Italian-style ice cream is served in large parlours and even drive-through businesses. Other Italian staples are polenta, tarta pascualina, and pastafrola.

In Chubut, the Welsh community is known for its teahouses, offering scones and torta galesa, which is rather like torta negra.

A fosforito is a ham and cheese sandwich using puff pastry as the bread. Sandwiches de miga are delicate sandwiches made with crustless buttered English bread, very thinly sliced cured meat, cheese, and lettuce. They are often purchased from entrepreneurial home cooks and may be eaten for a light evening meal.

A sweet paste, dulce de leche, is used to fill cakes and pancakes, spread over toasted bread for breakfast, or served with ice cream. Alfajores are shortbread cookies sandwiched together with chocolate and dulce de leche or a fruit paste. The "policeman's" or "truck driver's" sweet is cheese with quince paste or dulce de membrillo. Dulce de batata is made of sweet potato/yam; with cheese, this is called "Martín Fierro's sweet". Additionally, ice cream shops or heladerias are a big boom especially in the city of Buenos Aires. Argentinian ice cream comes in plenty of flavors (from fruits to cheesecake and even dulce de leche flavors) and has a special smoothness as it follows a recipe very similar to that of Italian gelato.

Apples, pears, peaches, kiwifruits, avocados, and plums are major exports.

A traditional drink of Argentina is an infusion called mate (in Spanish, mate, with the accent on the first syllable [MAH-teh]). The name comes from the hollow gourd from which it is traditionally drunk.

The mate (gourd) or other small cup is filled about three-quarters full with yerba mate, the dried leaves and twigs of the Ilex paraguariensis. The drink, which is rather bitter, is sipped through a metal or cane straw called a bombilla. Mate can be sweetened with sugar, or flavoured with aromatic herbs or dried orange peel.

Hot but not boiling water is poured into the gourd, drunk, then the mate is refilled. The mate is nearly full of leaves, so each refill only makes a small drink, but many refills are possible before the yerba is spent. In small gatherings it is traditional for one mate to be passed from person to person, filled by whoever has the kettle. It is customary not to thank the refiller routinely; a final gracias (thank you) implies that the drinker has had enough.

Drinking mate together is an important social ritual. Mate cocido is the same leaf, which rather than brewed is boiled and served, like tea, with milk and sugar to taste.

Other typical drinks include wine (sometimes with soda water added); tea and coffee are equally important. Quilmes is the national brand of pale lager, named after the town of Quilmes, Buenos Aires, where it was first produced.

== Ingredients ==
Argentine cuisine uses locally-grown cereals, grains, oil seeds, fruits and vegetables, as well as meat.

Meat products have been dominant in the country since the 16th century. The country is regarded as a major beef, pork and poultry producing and consuming country. Certain areas such as those located in the south are usually engaged in activities involving sheep and lamb breeding, and shellfish, crustaceans, molluscs and salmonides fishing.

The breeding activity involving any type of cattle has started a dairy industry that includes products like cow, and sheep, dulce de leche and yogurts. Some of the cheeses from Argentina are reggianito, sardo, provoleta and cremoso. Argentina can also be conceived as a industry engaged in the production of dried fruits, olives, all types of oils and spices.

In the Mesopotamia region, river fish such as silverside, surubi, dorado or boga are common.

== Regional differences ==
Argentine cuisine is heavily influenced by its European roots and has regional variations. Asado, dulce de leche, empanadas, and yerba mate are found throughout Argentina. In many parts of the country, food is prepared differently and different kinds of foods are made; this includes to a smaller degree food from pre-Columbian times, as in the Northwest.

=== Central region and la Pampa ===
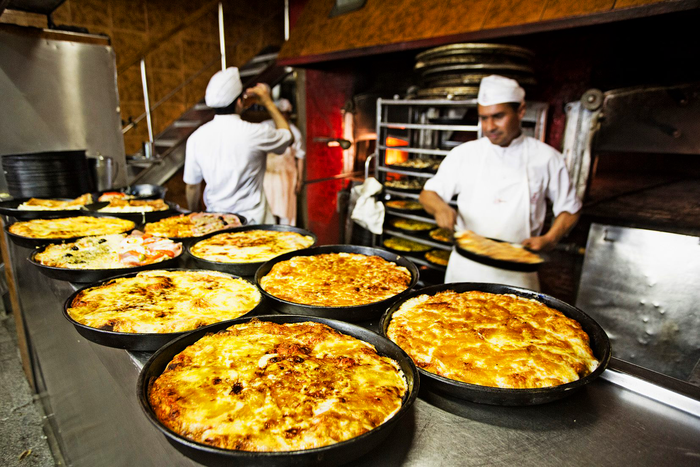
Typical pizzeria from Buenos Aires

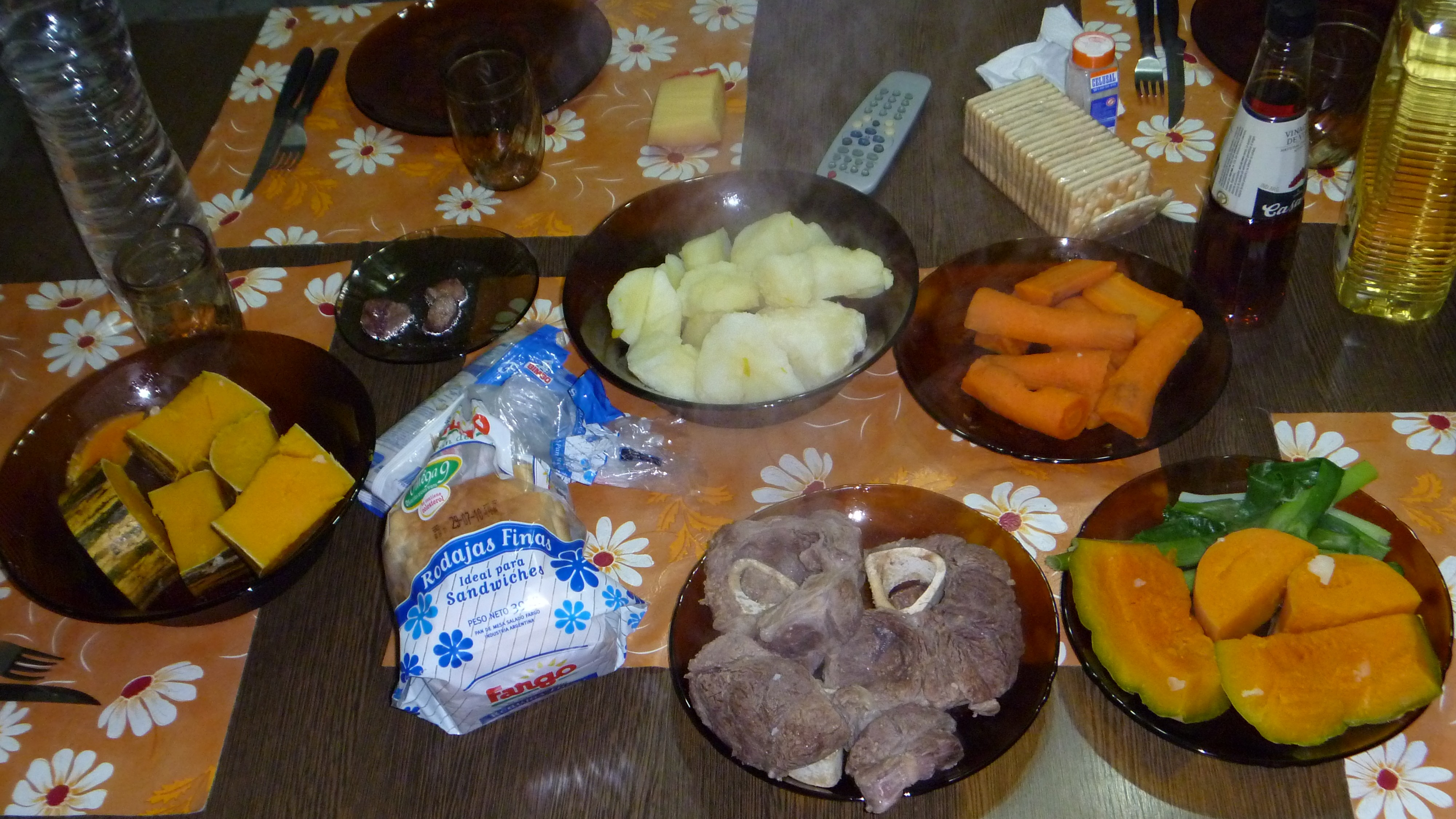
Argentine puchero

This region is composed of the city of Buenos Aires, Buenos Aires Province, Córdoba, La Pampa, Santa Fe, and Entre Ríos.

This region, especially within the larger urban areas of Buenos Aires, Rosario, and Córdoba welcomed European immigrants. These were especially of Italian and Spanish descent. Nevertheless, there was also a migratory flow of German, Swiss, and Middle Eastern immigrants arriving in Argentina. As a result, dishes such as pasta, pizza, pucheros (stews), croquetas (fritters), sauces, embutidos (sausages), and chicken and meat courses brought a wider scope of options to daily menus. The bread-making, dessert, pastry, and dairy industries have achieved considerable development in this region.

The above-mentioned dishes have developed a distinctively Argentine nuance. That is why, for example, Argentine pasta includes a wide variety of dishes ranging from spaghetti, fusiles (fusilli), ñoquis (gnocchi), ravioli, cintas (pasta ribbons), and lasagne to the Argentine-made sorrentinos, agnolottis (agnolotti), canelones (cannelloni), and fetuchines (fettuccine).

Pizza—made with very thin, and sometimes thick, high-rising doughs, with or without cheese, cooked in the oven or a la piedra (on a stone oven), and stuffed with numerous ingredients—is a dish which can be found in nearly every corner of the country. Buenos Aires, Rosario, and Córdoba also serve it with fainá, which is a chick pea-flour dough placed over the piece of pizza. People say that what makes Argentine pizza unique is the blending of Italian and Spanish cultures. At the turn of the 19th century, immigrants from Naples and Genoa opened the first pizza bars, though Spanish residents subsequently owned most of the pizza businesses.

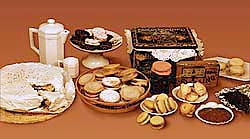
Argentine pastry, including Rogel (a cake of layers of hojaldre covered with meringue), dulce de leche, and regional variants of Alfajores (from Mar del Plata, Córdoba, Tucumán, among others).

Bread products are consumed all around the country. The deeply rooted bread, pastry, and dessert-making tradition derive from blending the above nationalities' products. Bakeries sell not only a wide scope of bread, cookies, and cakes, but also pastries. The latter resembles a sort of roll pastry whose main dough ingredient is either butter or fat and which may be simple or stuffed with dulce de leche, milk, jam, crema pastel, or quince or apple jelly, among other fillings. The most popular type of pastry is said to be that of medialunas (singular: medialuna, literally half-moon, that is to say, crescent), based upon French croissants. Sandwiches de miga are another type of bread products; they are made only with thin layers of white bread (generally referred to as crustless bread) and stuffed with food items ranging from ham and cheese to other more sophisticated combinations such as raw ham, tomatoes, olives, hard-boiled eggs, tuna, lettuce, red pepper, and the like.

Desserts and sweets are usually stuffed or covered with dulce de leche. The latter can be eaten alone or on top of cakes, alfajores, panqueques (crepes), and pastries, or as a topping spread over flan de leche. Chantilly cream is widely consumed and used in preparing sweets and desserts. Additionally, cakes, sponge cakes, and puddings are very popular dishes. Italian ice creams in this region also achieved a significant degree of development by adding local flavours that somehow preserved the local spirit involved in their preparation. Argentine cake, made of multiple layers of crepes, dulce de leche filling and topped with lemon icing, was declared Intangible Cultural Heritage of the Nation in 2023.

Although asado is eaten all over the country, its origin may be traced back to the Pampas. It entails many types of meat, which are generally eaten as follows: achuras (offal), morcilla (blood sausage), and sometimes also a provoleta (a piece of provolone cheese cooked on the grill with oregano) are eaten first. Then comes the choripán (a kind of spiced sausage made with pork or lamb and placed between two slices of bread), and finally meat such as asado de tira, vacío (flank steak), lomo (tenderloin), colita de cuadril (rump), matambre (rolled stuffed steak cut into slices and served cold), entraña (hanger steak); the list is never-ending. Cabrito al asador (roast kid or goat) is frequently eaten in the province of Córdoba.

=== Northwest and Cuyo ===
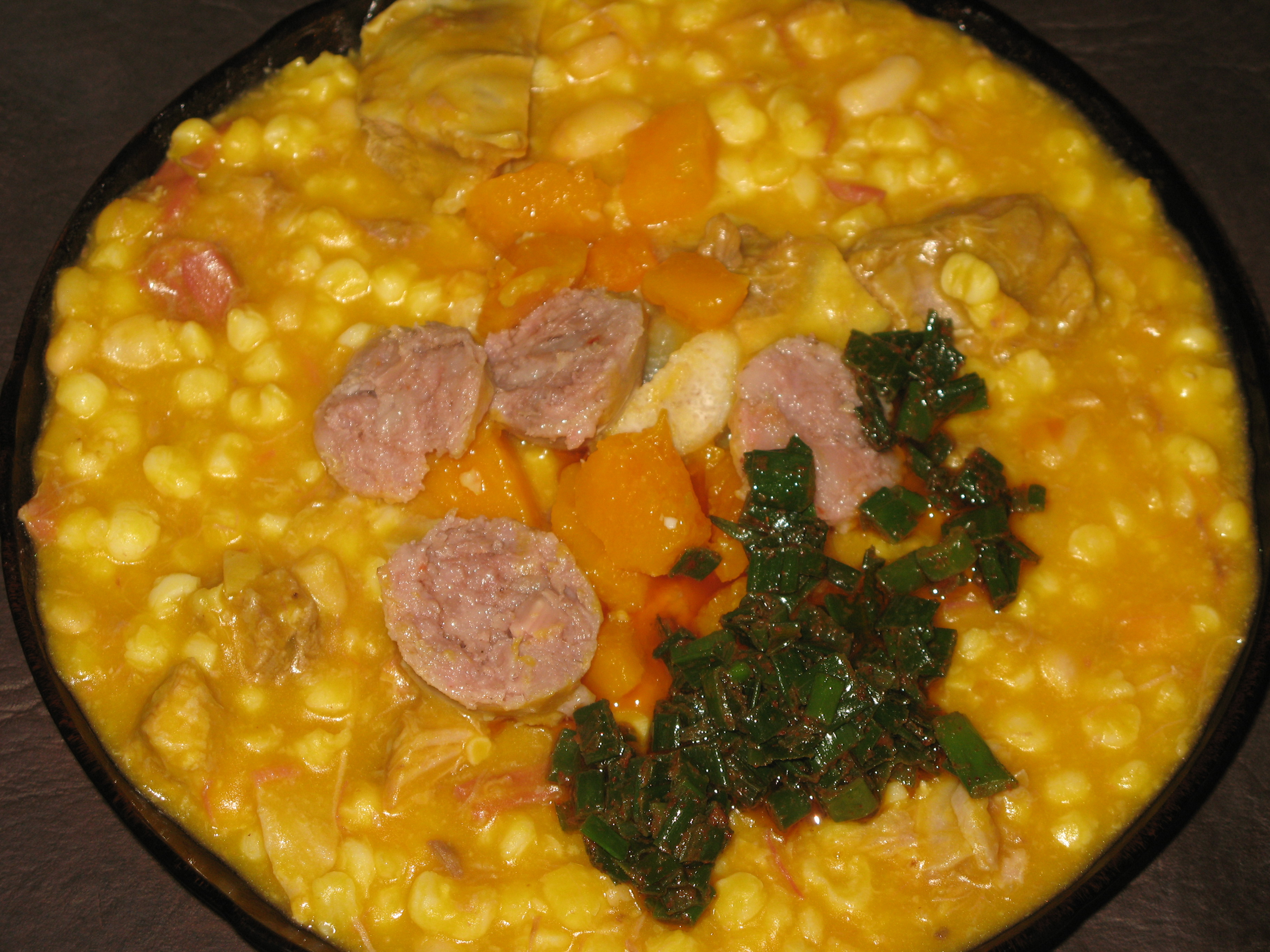
A bowl of locro stew, a traditional standby in northwestern Argentina.

This region includes the provinces of Jujuy, Salta, Catamarca, Tucumán, Santiago del Estero, La Rioja, San Juan, Mendoza, and San Luis. It is also regarded as the one most influenced by Native Americans, and its foods are closely linked to the Andean-Incan tradition. When preparing regional dishes, potatoes and corn or wheat are almost always used, including quinoa (a cereal typically used in Incan cuisine), peppers, squash, tomatoes and in some provinces beans. The most celebrated dishes are humita and tamal, in which the corn husk is stuffed with the corn filling itself, seasonings or meat.

This region is the most suitable to taste empanadas, particularly those stuffed with meat and offering different types of tempting varieties such as the meat empanada, salteña also filled with potatoes, or the empanada tucumana, which is stuffed with matambre and cut with a knife, or empanadas made with cheese. Empanadas are individual-sized and closed savoury pastries which may be fried or baked in the oven and are generally eaten with the hands.

Stews such as locro, carbonada, pollo al disco, and cazuelas (casseroles) are also typical dishes characterizing this region, which also include pumpkin or potato pudding stuffed with meat.

There are also some local holidays in this region related to food. For example, in Salta they hold a festival dedicated to a locally grown bean similar to edamame. During this holiday, the traditional foods of corn and beans are celebrated. Meals of all kinds are eaten, always with these two ingredients as a side dish, and even competitions of who can eat a set number of beans in the shortest period of time are held.

=== Mesopotamia ===
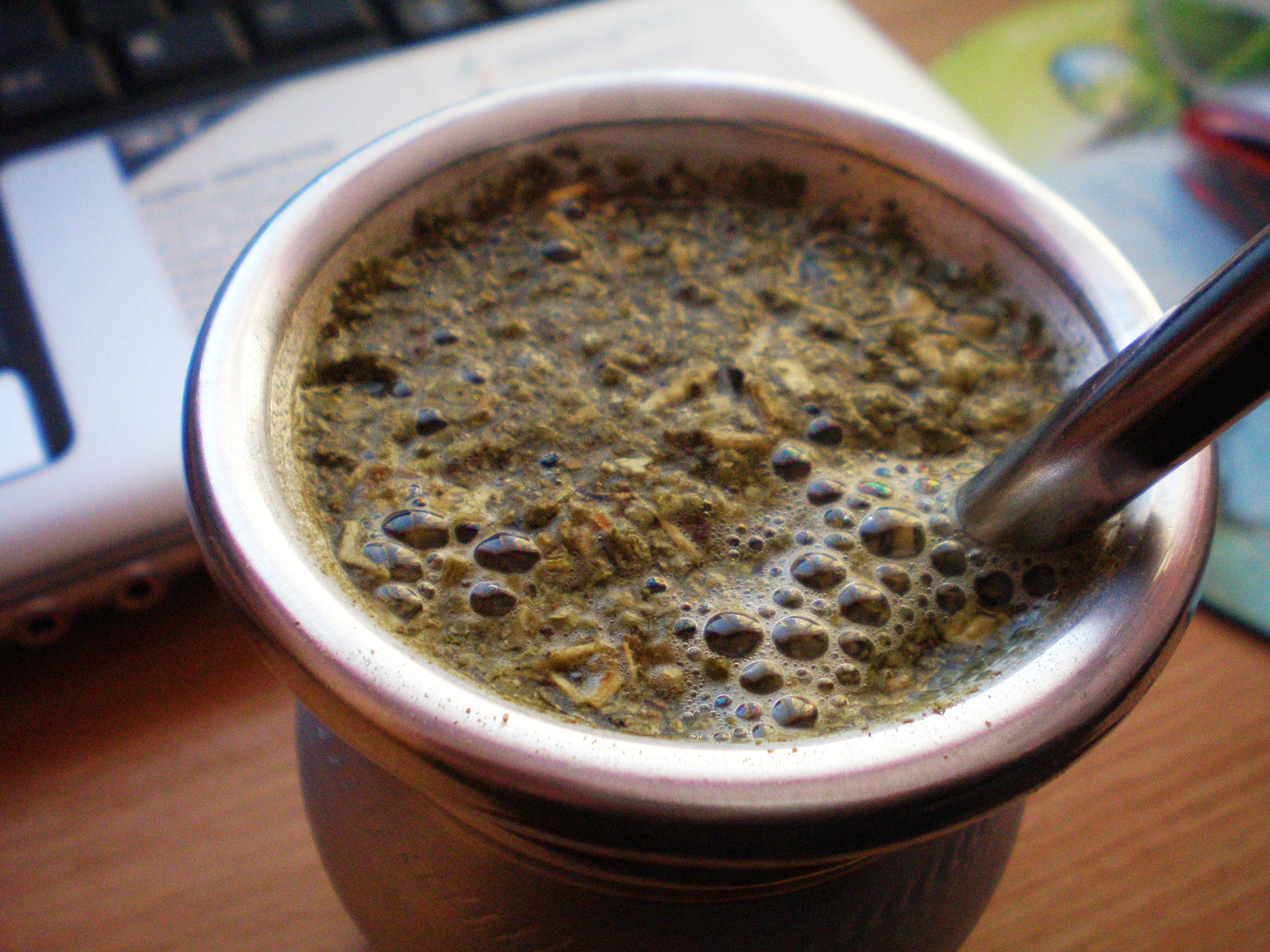
Mate, the northeastern region's best-known contribution to Argentine cuisine.

The humid and verdant area of north-east Argentina known as Mesopotamia, comprising the provinces of Chaco, Corrientes, Misiones and Formosa, is another area heavily influenced by Native Americans, particularly by the Guaraní people. Abounding in rivers and shores, it offers a wide diversity of fish species, such as dorado, pacú, surubi, boga and silverside.

Widely grown in this area, cassava is typically included in the region's dishes, as are other components of meals, such as chipá (cassava and cheese bread). However, in this area cassava is cooked alone too, boiled or fried, often as a side dish for asado and empanadas. As well, mbeyú, chipá avatí, sopa paraguaya, sopa correntina, chipa solo or chipá con carne, el quibebé, el borí borí, chipá guasú o pastel de choclo, mbaipy, chipá mbocá o chipá caburé and other similar meals. Chipá from cassava is often eaten during breakfast with yerba mate, prepared with hot water or with café con leche. Sopa Paraguaya and pastel/carta de choclo are eaten for lunch or dinner. As regards products made with sugar, Papaya (mamón in Argentine Spanish) jam is typical of the north of this region.

The principal product of this region is certainly yerba mate. Consumed countrywide, this product features a peculiarity of its own in this area: it is not only prepared with hot water but, driven by the region's high temperatures, it is common to see it prepared with cold water as well, in which case the beverage is known as tereré.

=== Patagonia ===
The large southern region of Patagonia is made up of the provinces Neuquén, Río Negro, Chubut, Santa Cruz and Tierra del Fuego. This area also includes the Antarctica and Islas del Atlántico Sur. (or southern atlantic islands). Their most typical food ingredients include fish and seafood from the sea and rivers and the products of the sheep that are widely farmed there.

Marine species such as salmon, spider crabs, squid and other shellfish and molluscs may be caught in the Atlantic Ocean. There are trout in the rivers.

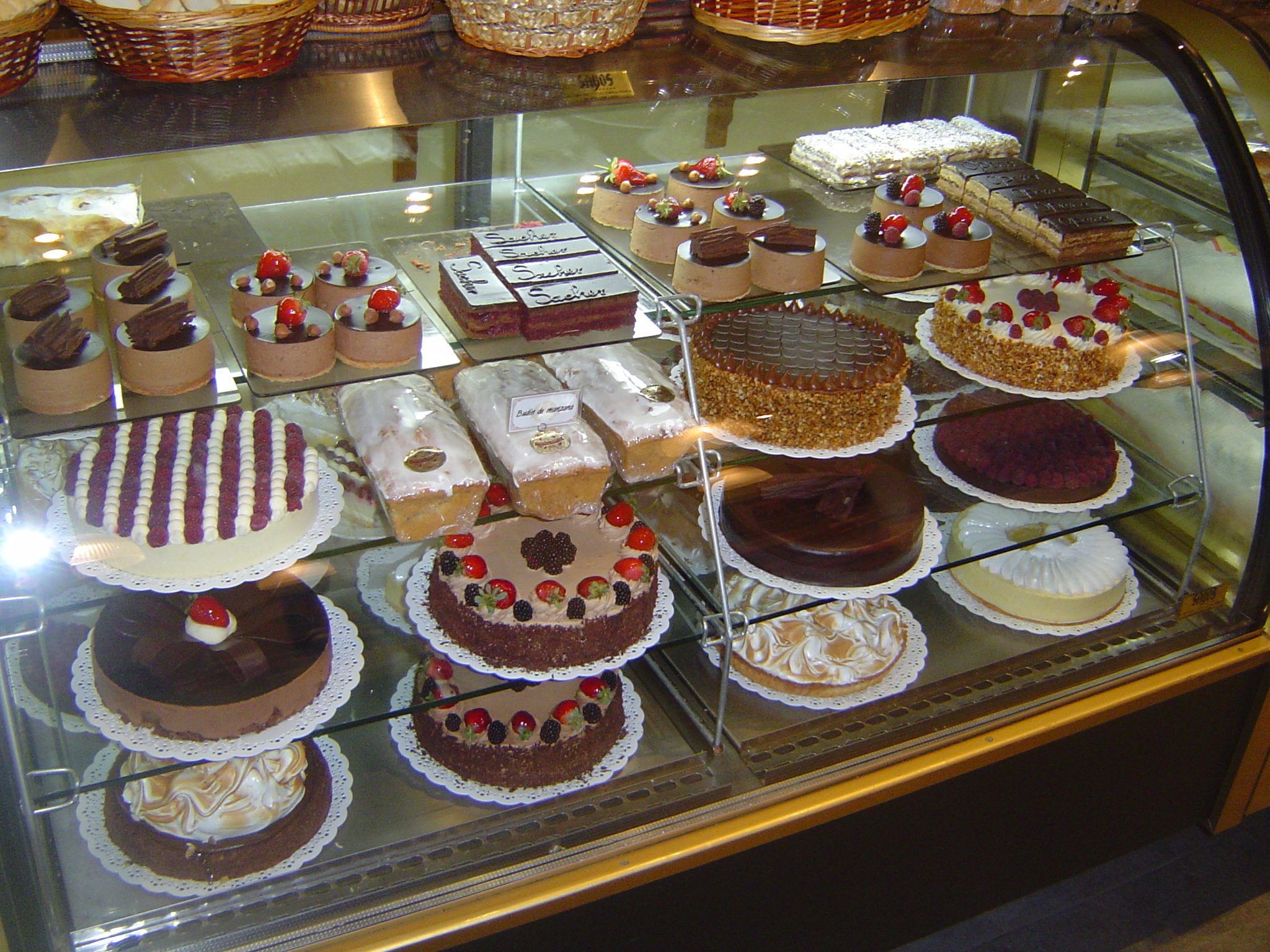
Chocolate y dulce de leche cakes and other regional favorites in a San Martín de los Andes, Neuquén shop.

The many berries grown in the area include cherries, bilberries, strawberries, rosa mosqueta and elders, which are made into jams.

The Northern and Central European settlements in this region have built up large-scale production of chocolate and its by-products. Viennese and German cuisine and pastries are also typically associated with this region.

Mutton and lamb, together with wild boar and venison tend to make up the region's meat-based dishes. Also typical of the southern region are smoked products, including salmon, stag, wild boar, and pheasant.

Patagonia has been profoundly influenced by the tribes living there since long before Europeans arrived, in particular, the Mapuches and the Araucanos. A typical dish prepared by the latter is the curanto (a term meaning "hot stone"). Its preparation involves making a fire in a hole about 150 cm deep in the ground, and heating stones in it. A bed of nalca or maqui leaves is arranged on top of the stones, and ingredients are added in turn on top. Ingredients vary, but may include beef, lamb, pork, chicken, Argentine chorizos (pork sausages), potatoes, sweet potatoes, apples and holed squashes filled with cheese, cream and peas. The food is covered with leaves and damp pieces of cloth to keep the heat in, and covered with plenty of soil.

== Alcoholic beverages ==
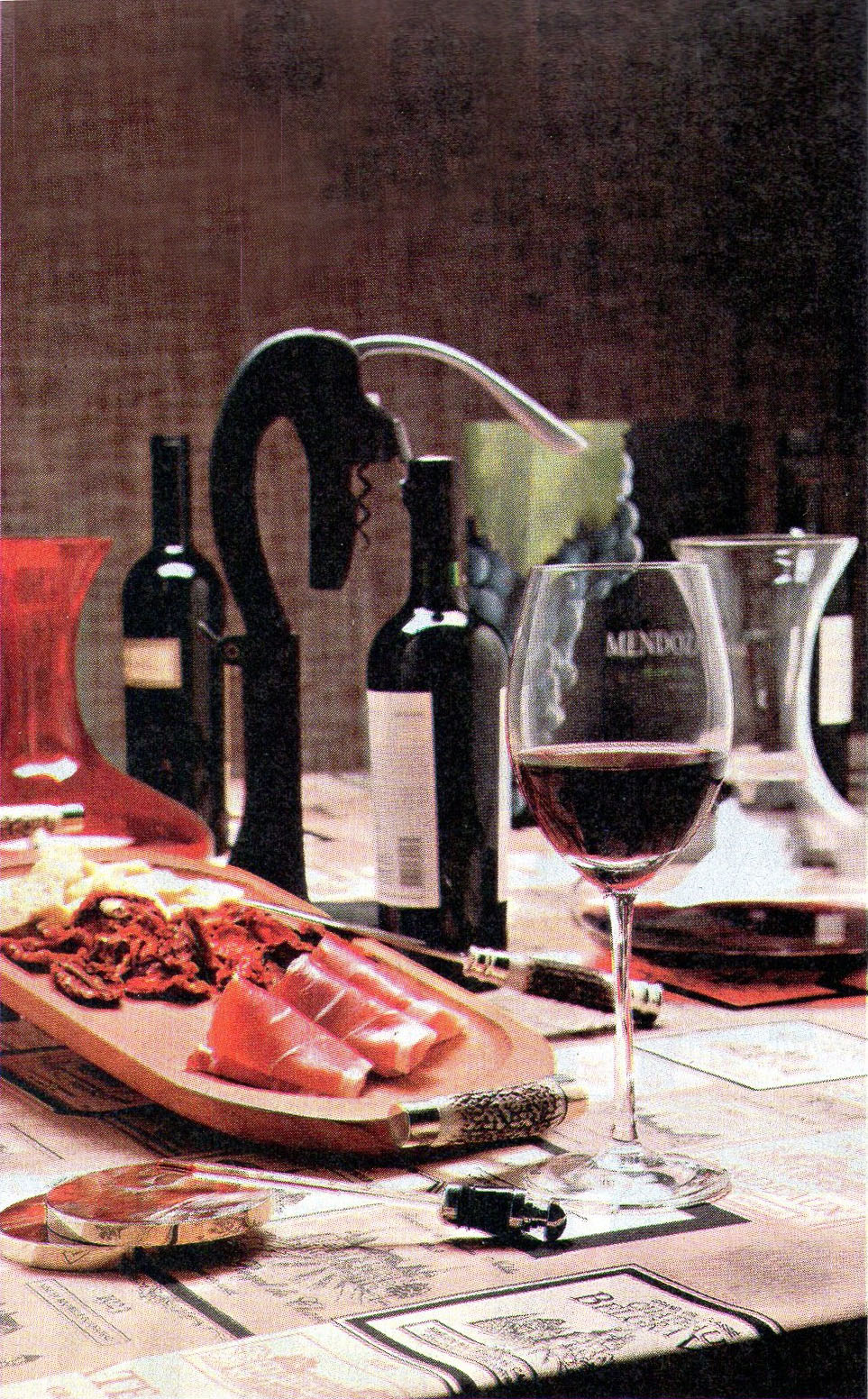
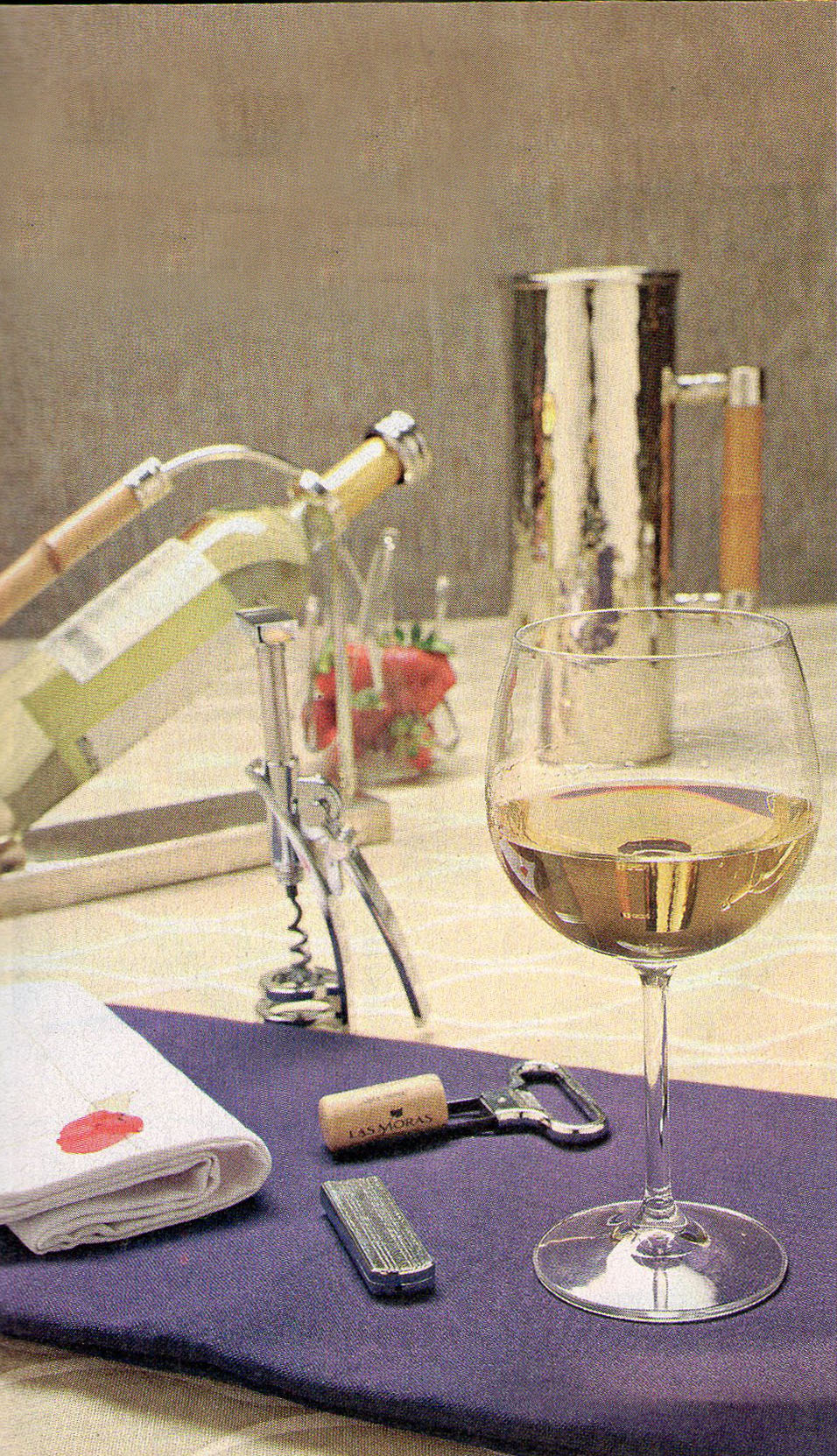
Glasses of Argentine red (left) and white (right) wine.

Though wine (vino) has traditionally been the most popular alcoholic beverage in Argentina, beer (cerveza; the Italian birra is frequently used) in recent decades has competed with wine in popularity. Breweries appeared in Argentina at the end of the 1860s, started by Alsatian colonists. The first were nearly all in the downtown of Buenos Aires (el égido de la Ciudad Autónoma de Buenos Aires), and soon Polish brewers began industrial production of beer: San Carlos in the province of Santa Fe, Río Segundo and Córdoba in the province of Córdoba, Quilmes and Llavallol on the outskirts of La Plata (in Buenos Aires Province), San Miguel de Tucumán in the province of Tucumán and on the outskirts of the cities of Mendoza and Salta.

The local consumption of beer has risen dramatically in the last generation: Argentines consumed 233 million litres in 1980 and 1.57 billion in 2007 (40 litres per capita). Outpacing that of wine since 2001, the growing production and consumption of beer have supported the existence of related events, for example, beer festivals called Oktoberfests or "Fiestas de la Cerveza" in locations that have a significant German population (Villa General Belgrano in Córdoba, San Carlos and Esperanza in the province of Santa Fe, etc.). Such celebrations copy, in an Argentine manner, Munich's Oktoberfest, and similarly are tourist attractions. However, the presence of a vigorous population of Celtic lineage, principally of Irish origin, has supported the creation of other celebrations of beer, often for marketing purposes, such as Saint Patrick's Day (Día de San Patricio), patron of Ireland, which is celebrated with abundant libations.

The consumption of alcoholic beverages in Argentina is similar to that of the United States and somewhat lower than the Western European average. Argentines enjoy a variety of alcoholic beverages and Argentina can boast a varied array of elaboraciones, whether industrial or artisanal. Besides beer and wine, Argentines frequently drink cider (here again, the heritage comes from Spain and Italy, more precisely from Asturias and Campania). Cider is the most popular beverage of the middle and lowers economic classes at Christmas and New Year (the upper classes proverbially preferring to celebrate with locally produced champagne, although real old-line "creole" aristocrats will still drink cider, which is much more traditional).

Other widely consumed spirits are aguardiente (firewater) made from sugar cane, known as caña quemada ("burnt cane") or, simply, 'caña' ("cane"). A folkloric note about caña quemada: until 21 June it is traditional to drink caña quemada with ruda macho (a variant of common rue), it is supposed that this mixture prevents the flu and other illnesses. Caña competes, mainly in rural areas, with gin ("ginebra"—as in the Dutch kind of gin.)

The bitter spirit Fernet, and particularly the Italian brand Fernet-Branca, is highly popular in Argentina. (A study in 2017 found that Argentines consume more than 75% of all fernet produced globally.) Fernet is most commonly enjoyed as a mixed drink with Coca-Cola. Given Fernet's qualities as a digestive aid, it is a common choice for an after-dinner digestif.

There are many artisanally produced liqueurs (distilled, flavoured alcoholic beverages) in Argentina, for example, those flavoured with orange, egg, anise, coffee, cherry and, inevitably, dulce de leche. The Hesperidina is a type of vermouth made from orange peels, invented in Argentina around 1890. One may also encounter chitronchelo or (in Italian) citronella, based on lemon. This beverage arrived with immigrants from the Mezzogiorno and is produced both artisanally and industrially (for example, at Mar del Plata).

== Non-alcoholic specialties ==
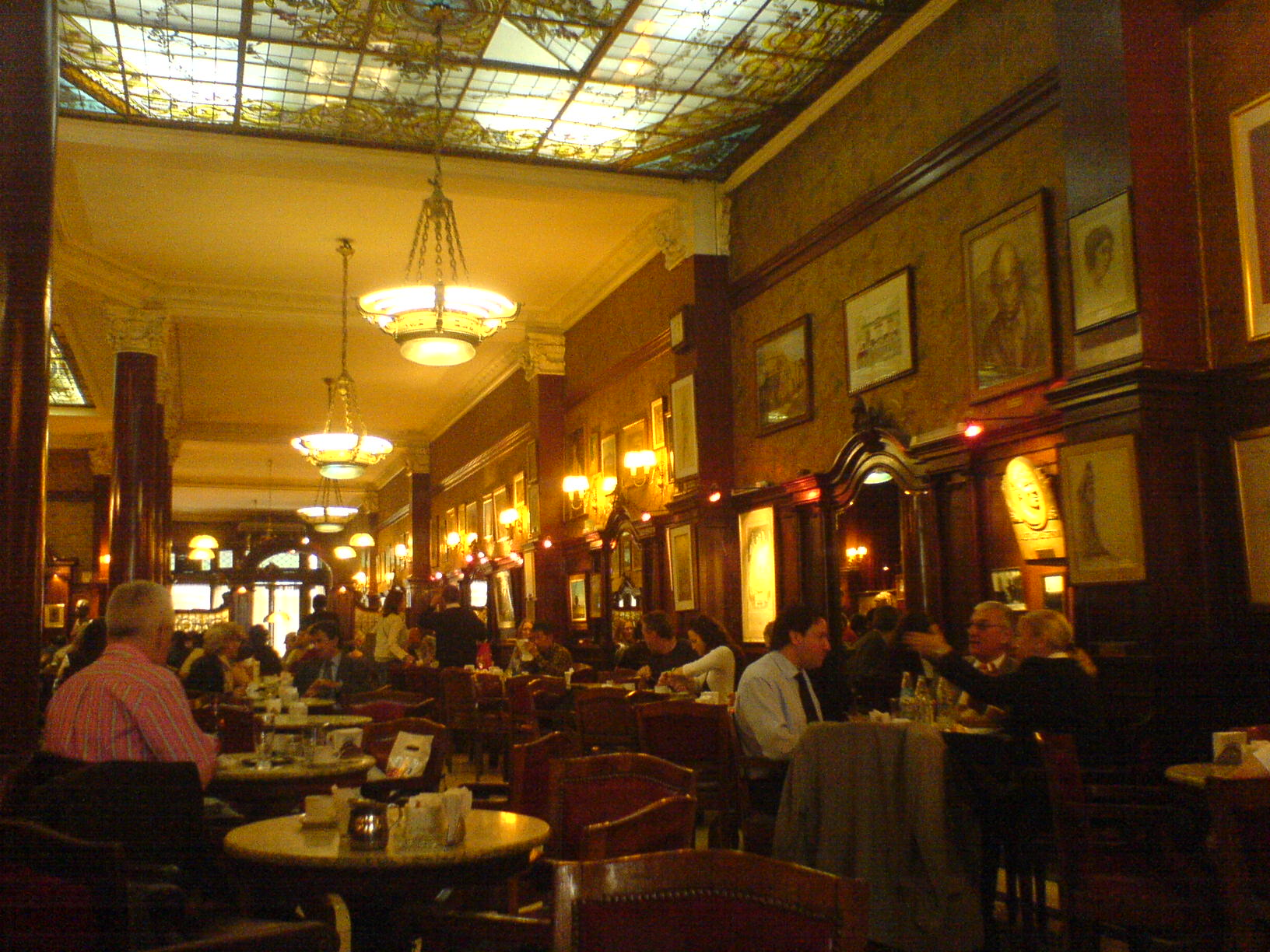
Café Tortoni, one of the many coffeehouses in Buenos Aires. The consumption of coffee is very common (141 cups per capita, annually).

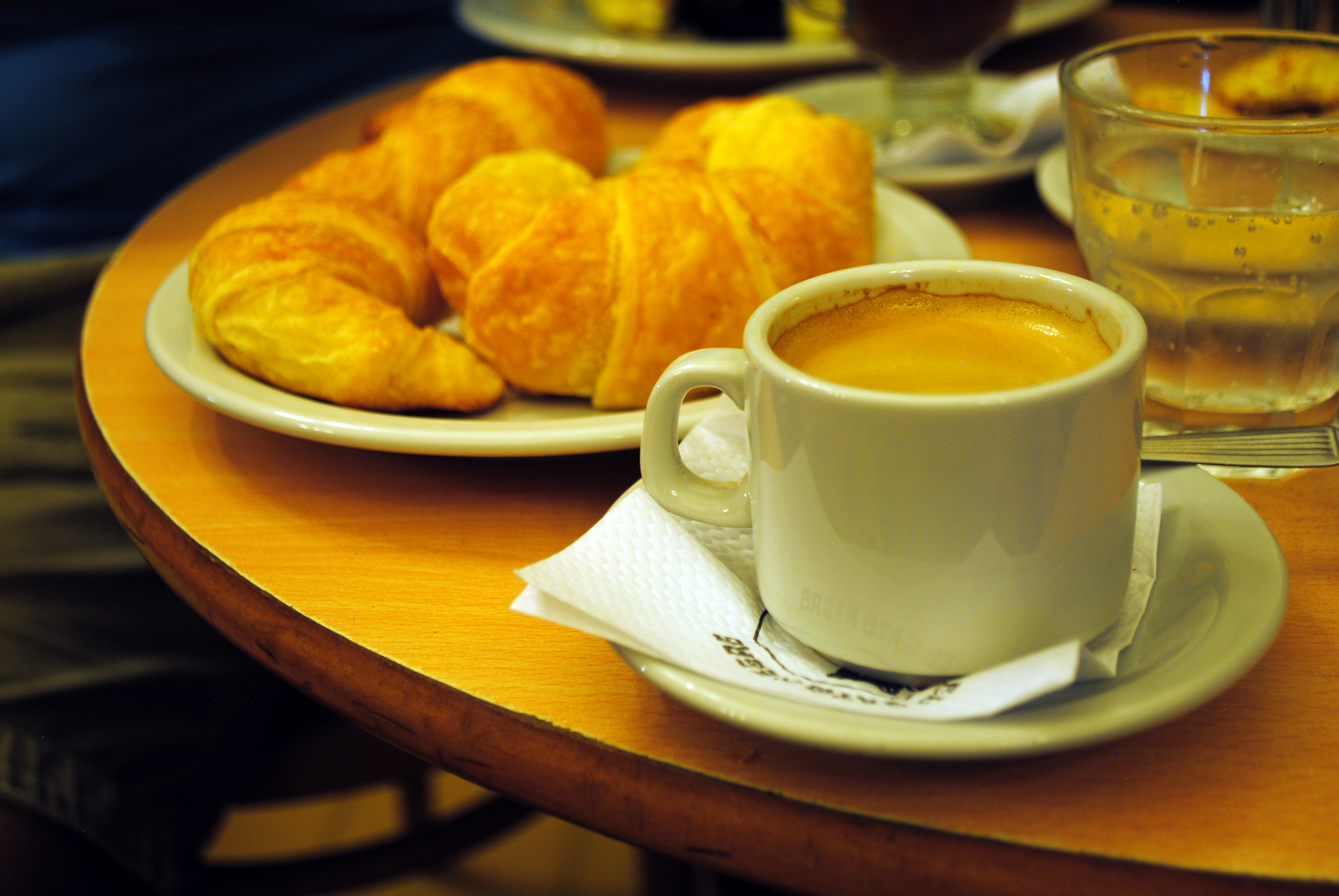
Traditional serving of merienda in Café El Gato Negro, Buenos Aires. Medialunas (croissants), café en jarrito (a double espresso coffee) and a little glass of mineral water.

Argentines enjoy a wide variety of non-alcoholic infusions (although now and then both "families" are mixed; the yerbiao for example, is mate mixed with caña or gin). Among these, mate has long been the most widely enjoyed; in 2006, over 700,000 metric tons were harvested in Argentina, mostly for domestic consumption. Mate is also one of the top exports from Argentina, as it is valued all over the world.

The fact that mate is so prevalent in the Southern Cone, however, should not necessarily make visitors think that other infusions are rare in the region; in Argentina especially, given the strong European cultural imprint, the consumption of coffee is very common (141 cups per capita, annually). Chocolate infusions are also popular (the eating of chocolate is a Spanish influence, although the plant originated in Mesoamerica). This consumption grows during autumn and winter, or in the cold regions of the country; there are two dates where consumption of chocolate infusions is traditional in the primary educational centres: 25 May and 9 July, that is, the two national dates of Argentina.

English cultural influence (reinforced at the end of the 19th century and the beginnings of the 20th by British contacts with the Far East) has also made the consumption of tea very common.

Medicinal herbs are common in the whole country; among the most popular are: chamomile, lanceleaf, boldo, poleo, peperina, carqueja, thyme, canchalagua, rue (macho and hembra, that is, "male" and "female"), mallow, rosemary, passion flower, bira bira, palán palán, muña muña, to mention only the main ones. Many of these herbs are also used in apéritifs and bitters, whether alcoholic or not.

== Popular short-order dishes ==
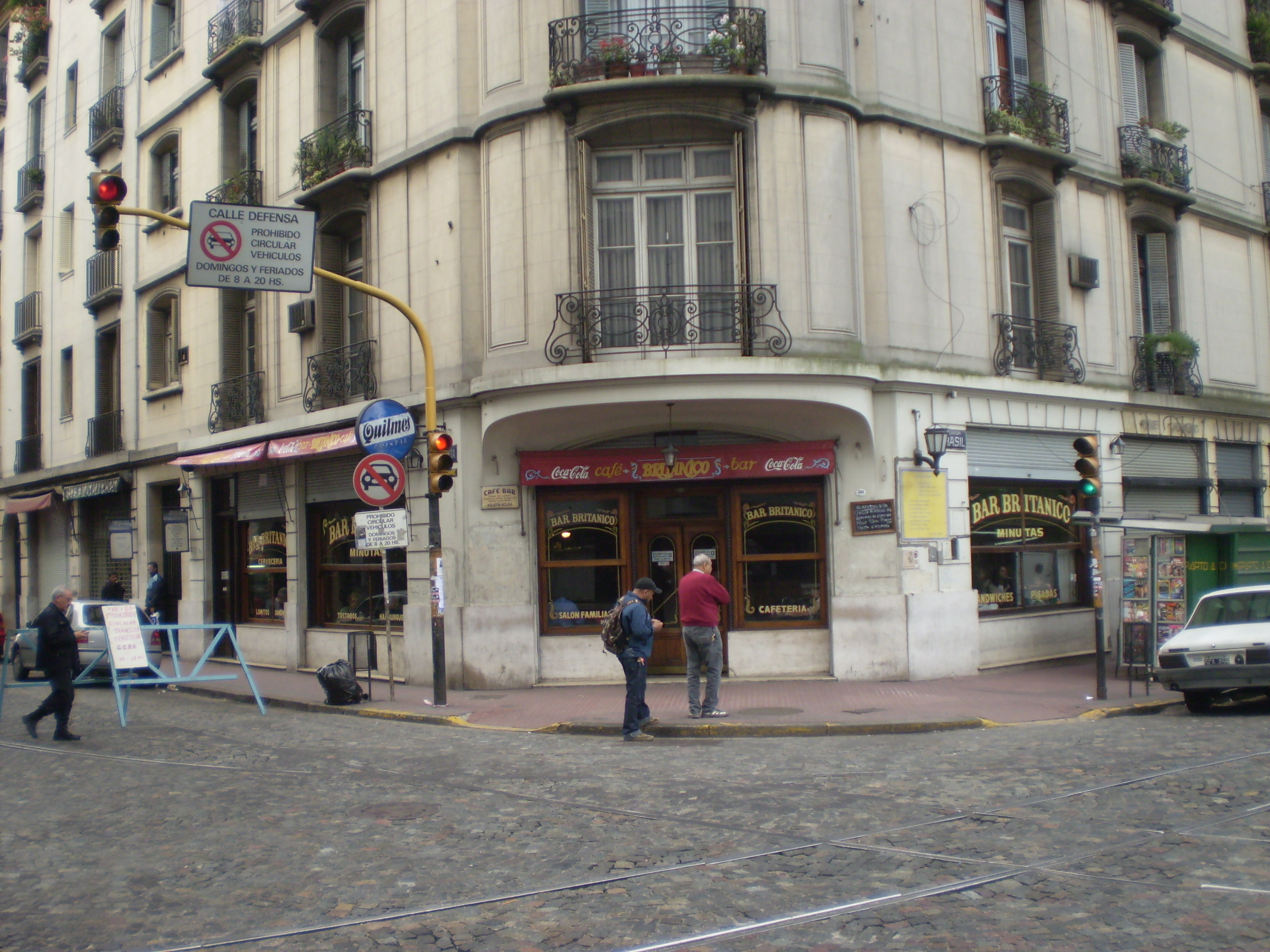
Bar Británico, Buenos Aires. These "bars" are typically more akin to British "pubs" and are popular at lunchtime.

Common restoranes or restaurantes and rotiserias (grill restaurants) nearly anywhere in Argentina today serve (into the small hours) quickly prepared meals that in the course of the 20th century came to be known as minutas, "short-order dishes". Some of the dishes included in the category of minutas are milanesas, churrascos, bifes (beefsteaks), escalopes, tallarines, ravioles (ravioli), ñoquis (gnocchi), although some are very typical of locations that sell food: "bifes" and "milanesas" are served "a caballo" ("on horseback", with fried egg on top), "milanesa completa" (a milanesa with two fried eggs and French fries), "revuelto Gramajo", "colchón de arvejas" (an omelette made with peas), "suprema de pollo" (chicken supreme, usually breaded as a milanesa), matambres, "lengua a la vinagreta" (pickled tongue), and "sandwiches" (sandwiches de miga) are made with sliced white bread, rather than, say, rolls.

The most common sandwiches are those made of milanesa, baked ham and cheese, pan de miga, toast, pebetes, panchos (hot dogs), choripanes, morcipanes, etc.; from Montevideo comes a different species of sandwich called the chivito, even though it contains no goat meat.

Picadas, which are consumed at home or in bars, cafés, "cafetines" and "bodegones" are also popular; they consist of an ensemble of plates containing cubes of cheese (typically from Mar del Plata or Chubut), pieces of salame, olives in brine, french fries, maníes (peanuts), etc.; picadas are eaten accompanied by an alcoholic beverage ("fernet", beer, wine with soda, to give some common examples).

The people of Argentina greatly enjoy helado (ice creams of Italian lineage or sorbets Spanish lineage). In Spanish colonial times, a type of sorbet was made from hail or snow.

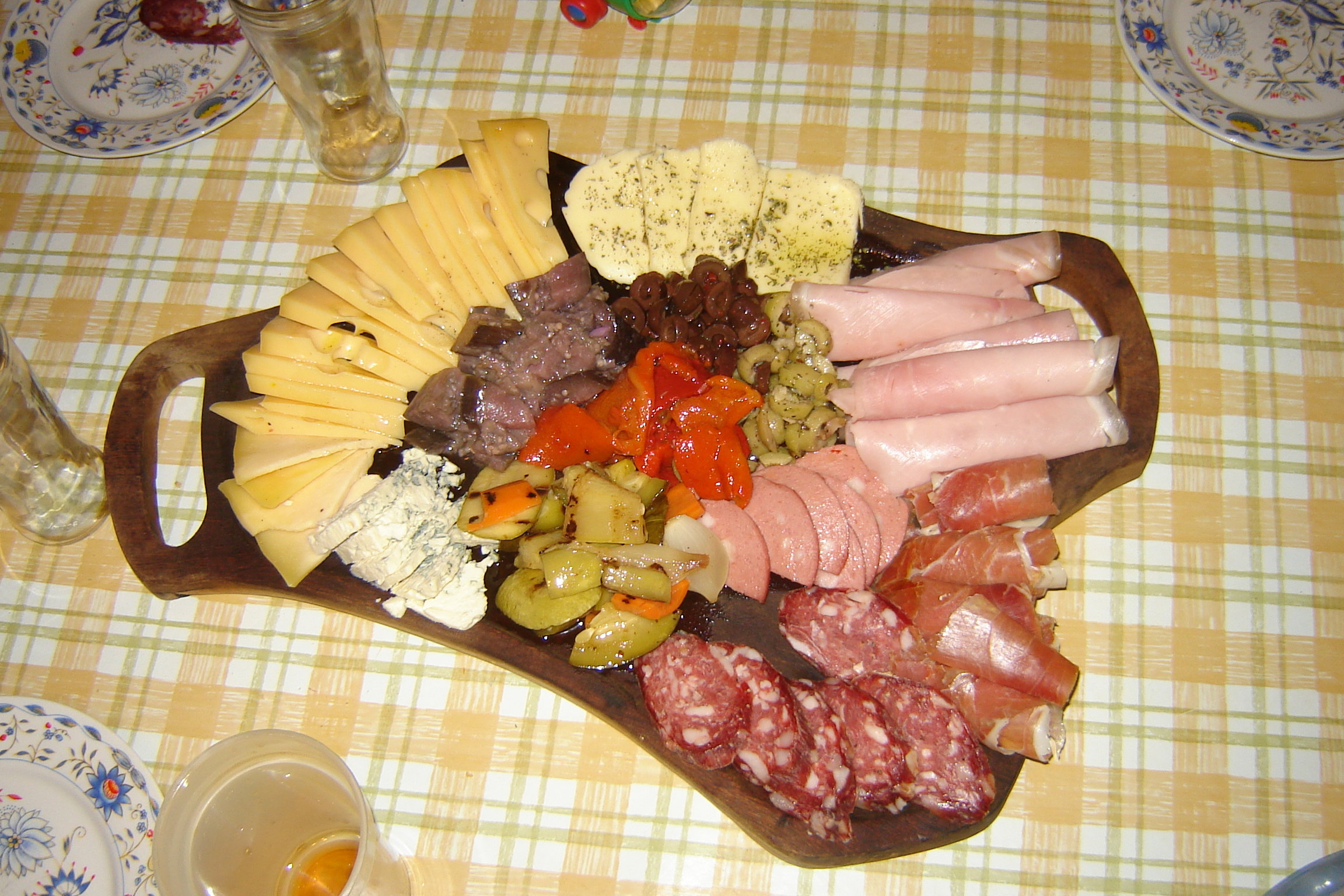
A picada, the Italian-influenced between-meals standby

== Eating habits ==
Breakfast typically is small and consists of coffee (or mate) and pastry. In most parts of Argentina, lunch is the largest meal of the day. Excluding the largest cities, such as Buenos Aires, Rosario or Cordoba, most towns close for lunchtime. This is when most people return home to enjoy a large meal and siesta. Traditional lunches in Argentina are long and well developed. Argentines often have a light evening snack (called a "merienda" – typically a coffee or mate and a pastry) and it is common to not eat dinner until 9 at night, or even later on weekends.

== See also ==
- Argentine pizza
- Cheese in Argentina
- Italian cuisine
- Spanish cuisine
- Uruguayan cuisine
