= Argentine cheese =

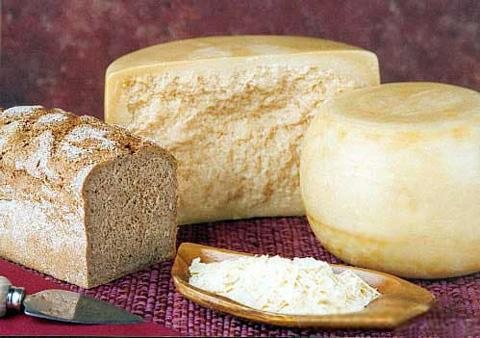
Reggianito, a Grana-type cheese, is the most important hard cheese in Argentina, being the most exported and most consumed in the country. Based on cheeses like Parmesan and Grana Padano, it showcases the enduring influence of Italian immigration in Argentine cuisine.

Argentine cheese is by far the most produced dairy product in the country, making Argentina the second largest cheese producer in Latin America and among the top 10 cheese-producing countries in the world. In addition, Argentina is the Latin American country that consumes the most cheese, with 12 kilos per capita per year. Production is mainly centered in the provinces of Córdoba, Santa Fe and Buenos Aires, in the Pampas region of the central and east-central parts of the country.

In the 18th century—during the colonial era—Argentina was the place of origin of the Tafí del Valle and Goya cheeses which, along with Chanco from Chile, constitute the oldest cheeses created in the Southern Cone region of South America. Tafí del Valle is the oldest cheese of Argentina and originated in what is now the city of the same name in Tucumán, traditionally attributed to Jesuit missionaries, while Goya was created in what is now the city of the same name in Corrientes. These cheeses are one of the few typical Latin American food products with nearly three hundred years of history, along with tequila from Mexico, pisco from Peru and Chile, and chicha, among others.

Modern Argentine cheesemaking culture emerged as a result of the major European immigration wave that took place during the late 19th and early 20th centuries, which turned Buenos Aires into a "melting pot" and a great cosmopolitan city, while radically changing the customs of both the working and upper classes. These immigrants, especially those from Italy, introduced the cheesemaking technologies of their home countries and attempted to recreate their cheeses. Popular cheeses of Argentine origin include Reggianito, Sardo, Cremoso, Provoleta and Pategrás.

== Production ==
The Argentine dairy industry is highly developed and is among the most modern in Latin America. Cheese is by far the most produced dairy product in the country, accounting for approximately 45% of national milk production, making the country one of the top 10 cheese-producing countries in the world and the second in Latin America after Brazil. More than half of the total cheese production of the country corresponds to soft cheeses (with Cremoso being the most consumed in the country), followed by semi-hard cheeses (30%) and hard cheeses (15%).

Dairy production is mainly centered in the Pampas region of the central and east-central parts of Argentina, the region of the country most influenced by the Great European immigration wave of the late 19th and early 20th centuries. The provinces with the most important cheese production are Córdoba, Santa Fe and Buenos Aires, and to a lesser extent La Pampa, Entre Ríos and San Luis.

Due to the wide range of high-quality cheese produced in Argentina, imports of cheeses are very low—between 2,000 and 8,000 million tonnes—and mainly come from Brazil and Uruguay. The country to which the most cheese is exported is Brazil—accounting for 43% of the total exports as of 2011—followed by Venezuela, Russia, Mexico, Chile and South Korea.

Argentina is also the Latin American country that consumes the most cheese, with 12 kilos per capita per year. As a result of increased consumption, the cheese production in the country grew significantly in the 2000s decade, going from 430,955 tonnes in 2001 to 508,000 tonnes in 2009. During this period, cheese consumption went from 8.3 kg per capita in 2003 to 12.4 kg per capita in 2012.

== Argentine cheeses ==
=== Hard cheeses ===
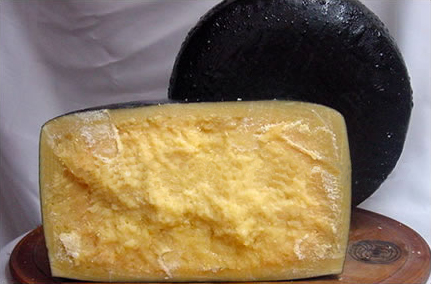
Created during the colonial era, Goya is among the oldest cheeses that originated in the Southern Cone region of South America.

- Goya – One of the oldest cheeses of Argentina, it was created by Gregoria Morales in the late 18th century in the province of Corrientes. Morales' nickname was Goya, so the cheese began to be called by that name, as well as the town where she was based, 200 km from the city of Corrientes. By 1840, Goya was so popular that it was the best-selling cheese in the city of Buenos Aires. The cheese is now regarded as a classic of Argentine culture. Along with the Tafí del Valle cheese, Goya is one of the few typical Latin American food products with nearly three hundred years of history.
- Reggianito — A popular Grana-type cheese that is made from cow's milk and is mainly produced in the provinces of La Pampa, Buenos Aires, Santa Fe, Córdoba and San Luis. Reggianito is based on Italian hard cheeses such as Parmigiano Reggiano and Grana Padano, as it is the result of the adaptation of the cheesemaking technology introduced by Italian immigrants. In fact, its name is a diminutive of Reggiano and can be translated as "Little Reggiano", as it is produced in much smaller wheels and only aged for 5–6 months. Reggianito has been credited as one of the reasons why Parmigiano Reggiano received Protected Denomination of Origin, as "Italian cheesemakers feared [it] would become a serious threat to their export market." Reggianito is considered the most important hard cheese of Argentina, as it is the most exported and most consumed in the country.

=== Semi-hard cheeses ===
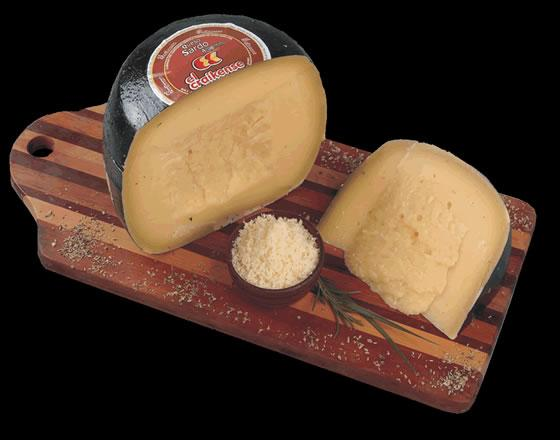
Another cheese of Italian heritage, Sardo is based on Pecorino Romano. Depending on its age, Sardo can be recognized as either a semi-hard cheese, or a hard cheese.

- Chubut – Named after the Patagonian province of Chubut, where it was created by Welsh immigrants during the mid-to-late 19th century as they prepared a homemade cheese following the techniques of their ancestors. The popularity of this cheese spread thanks to the Magnasco company, which registered Chubut cheese in 1900 and began producing it in the city of Río Cuarto, Córdoba. This product was later detached from the original formula and began to be known as Río Cuarto cheese. Chubut cheese has historically been popular as a pairing with quince paste (Spanish: dulce de membrillo), a combination called queso y dulce (lit. 'cheese and jam') or vigilante, a typical dessert of Argentine cuisine.
- Mar del Plata — known as Mar del Plata for having been created in the coastal city of the same name, it was formerly called Holanda, both for its similarities with the Gouda cheese and for the breed of cattle that produces the milk from which it's obtained, the Holando-Argentino. Mar del Plata is a semi-fat cheese that is made with partially skimmed cow's milk and is matured from 4 to 12 months. It has a light yellowish color and well scattered eyes, and its rind is naturally paraffined or colored with red or yellow paint. For this reason, Holanda cheese is also known as Cáscara Colorada (English for "red rind"). Some sources consider Mar del Plata to be another name for the local semi-hard cheese Pategrás. It is related to Edam cheese, which was adapted by European immigrants.
- Pategrás – The most popular semi-hard cheese produced in Argentina. It is made with pasteurized cow's milk and has a white-yellowish and uniform color, which has a firm and compact texture and an elastic consistency. Pategrás has a characteristic sweet flavor and a clean, well-developed aroma. The rind of the cheese is smooth and closed, generally covered with a layer of natural paraffin or colored with a red or yellow plastic emulsion. There is a variety of Pategrás known as "pategrás sandwich" or "queso barra", which has a more elastic texture and does not have eyes, with the intention of being cut into thin slices.
- Provoleta — A local variant of Provolone that is traditionally grilled and eaten as an appetizer while barbecuing. It was created by the Italian immigrant Natalio Alba in the 1940s, looking to find a cheese that could be cooked as part of the typical Argentine asado. Provoleta entered the Food Code in 1955 under the name Queso Provolone Hilado Argentino (English: "Argentine Stretched Provolone Cheese").
- Sardo — A yellowish white cheese similar to Pecorino Romano, although the latter is made from sheep's milk while Sardo is made with cow's milk. In its youth, Sardo is a semi-hard cheese with a soft, sweet and aromatic flavor, and as it matures it acquires more hardness and a more intense flavor. In fact, Sardo may also be considered a hard cheese.
- Tafí del Valle – The cheese of Tafi del Valle, Tucumán, is the oldest cheese of Argentine origin, created in the 18th century and traditionally attributed to Jesuit missionaries. Along with Goya cheese, Tafí del Valle cheese is one of the few typical Latin American food products with nearly three hundred years of history. Every year, the city of Tafí del Valle hosts the National Cheese Festival (Spanish: Festival Nacional del Queso).

=== Soft cheeses ===
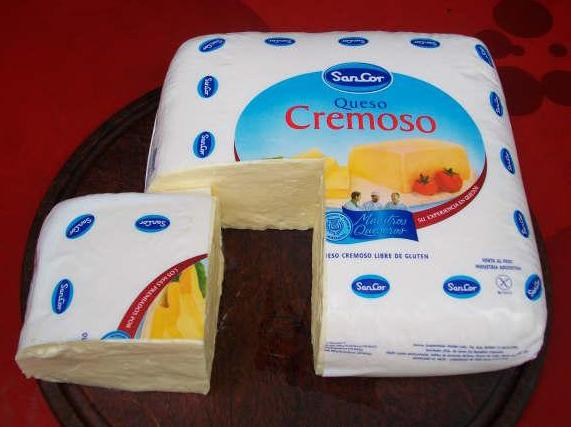
Cremoso, the most popular cheese in Argentina.

- Cremoso — Also known as Mantecoso (English: "buttery") and Fresco (English: "fresh"), Cremoso cheese is defined by the Argentine Food Code as a "high and very high moisture product, made from whole milk or standardized milk, with or without the addition of cream, acidified by lactic bacteria culture and coagulated by rennet and/or specific enzymes." Cremoso is a white-yellowish cheese, with a sweet and slightly acid taste. Its paste is soft and somewhat elastic, and it is matured between 20 and 30 days. Cremoso is derived from the cheeses of Italy and Switzerland. As its name suggests, Cremoso varies between a somewhat elastic texture, and a creamy and sticky consistency. It is the most popular cheese in Argentina, as it is prized for its high meltability.
- Cuartirolo – Defined by the Argentine Food Code as a "high and very high moisture product, made from whole milk or standardized milk, acidified by lactic bacteria culture and coagulated by rennet and/or specific enzymes." Some authors consider Cuartirolo to be another name for Cremoso cheese, with the 2017 book Global Cheesemaking Technology—edited by Photis Papademas and Thomas Bintsis—noting that: "Even if some sources in the literature and the Argentinean legislation distinguish between [Cremoso and Cuartirolo], they are virtually the same".
- Quesillo — Artisan cheese produced in the Argentine Northwest, mainly the provinces of Catamarca and Tucumán, but also Santiago del Estero, Salta and Jujuy. It is defined as a "fresh product obtained by spinning an acidified paste" and an "intermediate product obtained by coagulation of milk by means of rennet and supplemented or not by the action of specific lactic acid bacteria". Quesillo's origin dates back to the dairy activity developed by the original locals of the region, being a traditional product made mainly by women with recipes passed down from generation to generation. In 2017, after an initiative supported by the governments of Tucumán, Salta and Catamarca, Quesillo was officially incorporated to the Argentine Food Code, which enables the cheese to be produced and distributed outside the informality that characterized it until then.

== See also ==
- Argentine cuisine
- Argentine pizza
- List of Argentine dishes
- List of Argentine sweets and desserts
- List of Italian cheeses

== Bibliography ==
- Balmaceda, Daniel (2016). La comida en la historia argentina (eBook) (in Spanish). Buenos Aires: Editorial Sudamericana. Penguin Random House. ISBN 978-9500756891 – via Google Books.
- Papademas, Photis; Bintsis, Thomas, eds. (2017). Global Cheesemaking Technology. Hoboken, New Jersey: John Wiley & Sons. ISBN 9781119046158.
