= Sándwich de miga =

Sandwich popular in Argentina and Uruguay

Sandwiches de miga
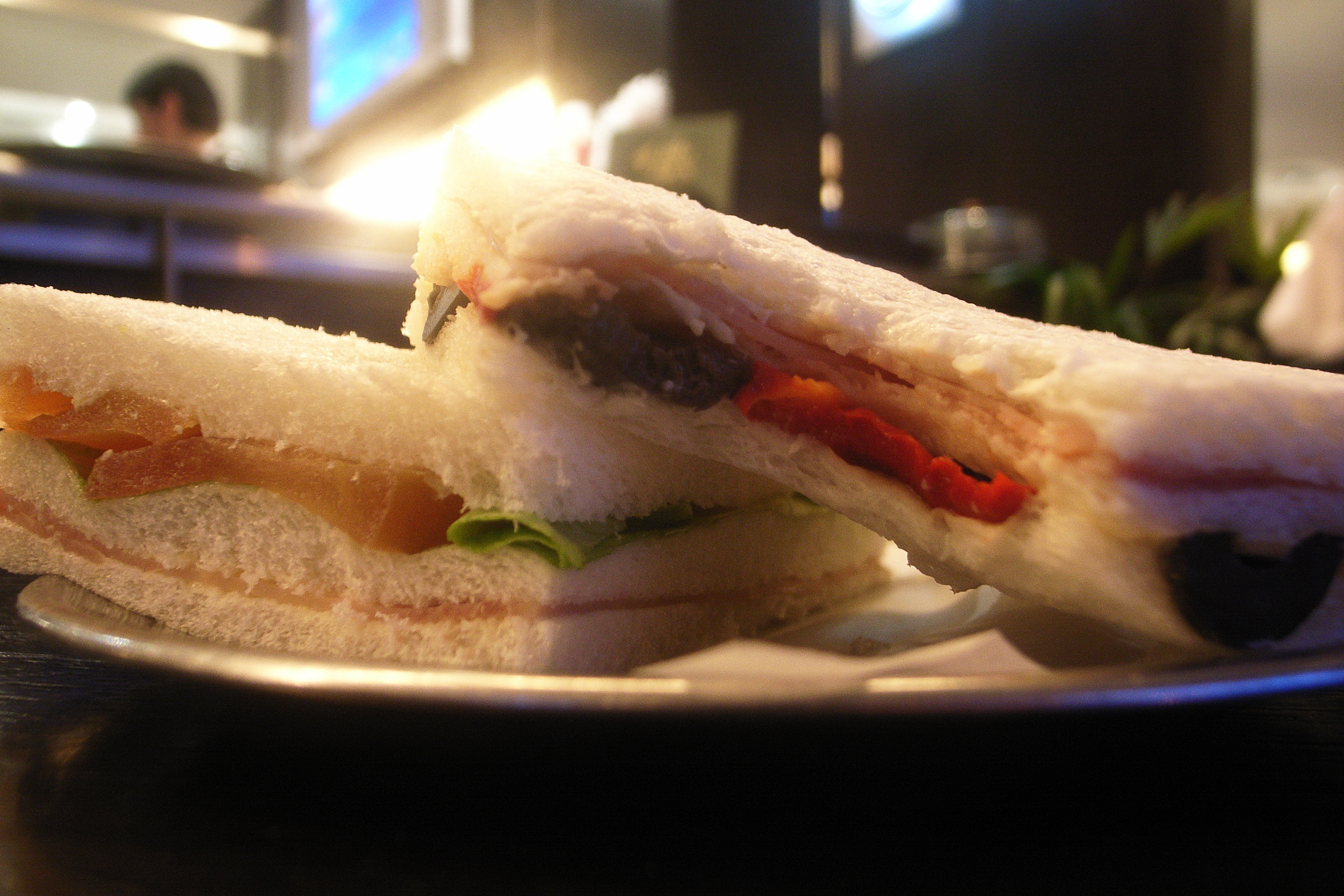
- Type: Sandwich
- Place of origin: Argentina; Uruguay
- Main ingredients: White bread, ham, eggs, cheese, tomatoes, green peppers, lettuce

Sándwiches de miga, or simply sánguches or 'triples', are popular food items in Argentina and Uruguay, where they are often consumed at parties. Rather than making them from scratch, Argentines usually buy them at a local bakery. They can be toasted or untoasted. The toasted version is common bar food in both countries, known locally as tostados or carlitos in Argentina, and sándwiches calientes in Uruguay.

The sandwiches are single, double or multiple layered and are made from thinly sliced bread with no crust, i.e. the part of the bread called miga. They are filled with thinly sliced cold cuts (especially ham), hard-boiled eggs, cheese, tomatoes, bell peppers, tuna, lettuce, and sometimes other vegetables such as asparagus. Butter or mayonnaise is another important ingredient.

The sándwiches de miga resemble the Italian tramezzino and the English cucumber sandwich for afternoon tea, which is a typical tea-time food. The Academia Argentina de Gastronomía suggests that the sandwiches may have been introduced into Argentina by immigrants from Northern Italy. The Buenos Aires newspaper Clarín, however, suggests that the sandwich was actually invented by local bakers at the Confitería Ideal, who had made a sandwich with a recreated English-style bread to satisfy a group of homesick British engineers who used to frequent their establishment during the early part of the twentieth century.

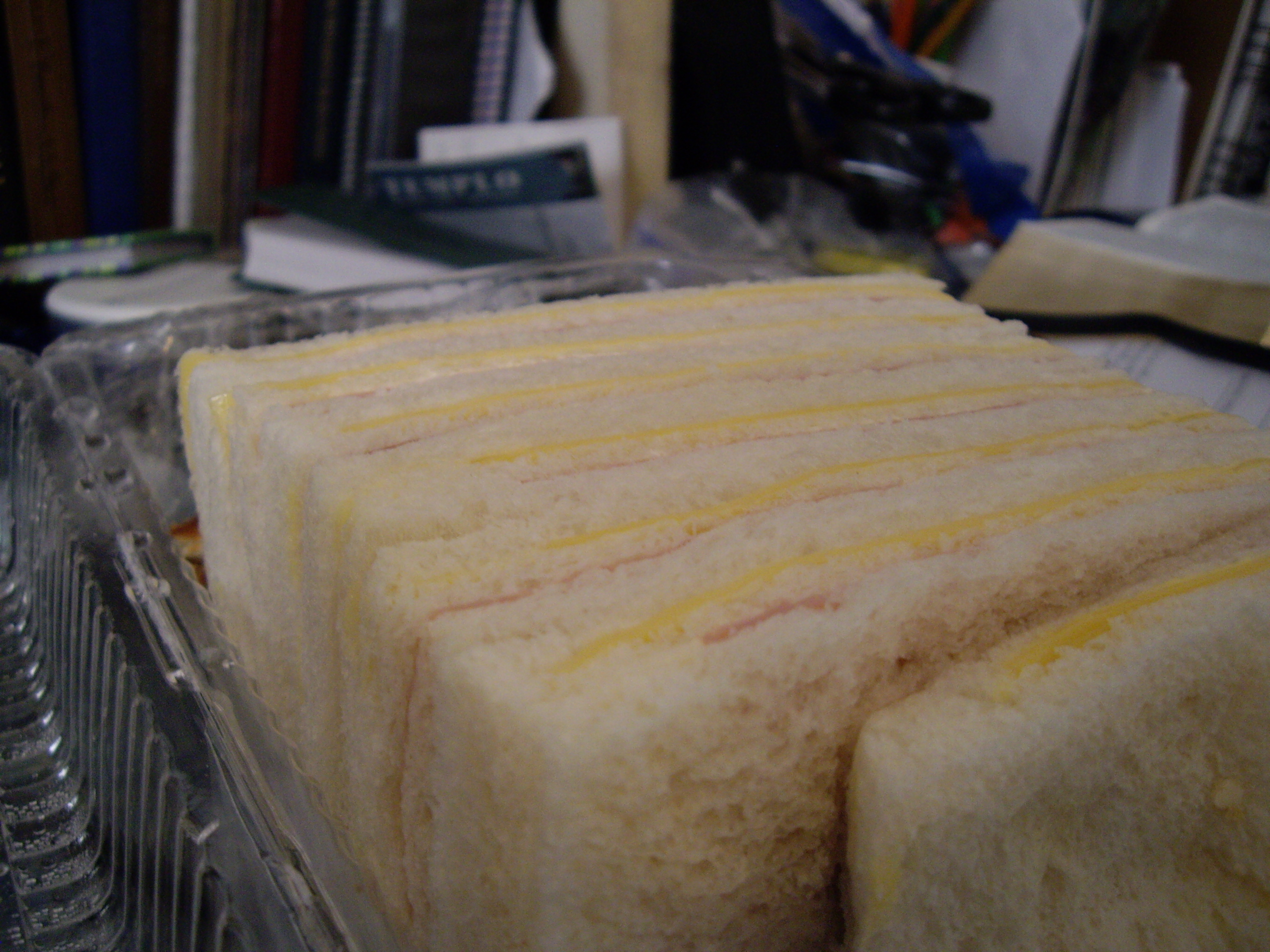
Sándwiches de miga

== See also ==
- Crustless bread
- Cuisine of Argentina
- Tea sandwich
- List of sandwiches
