= Argentine cake =

Argentine dessert

Torta Argentina
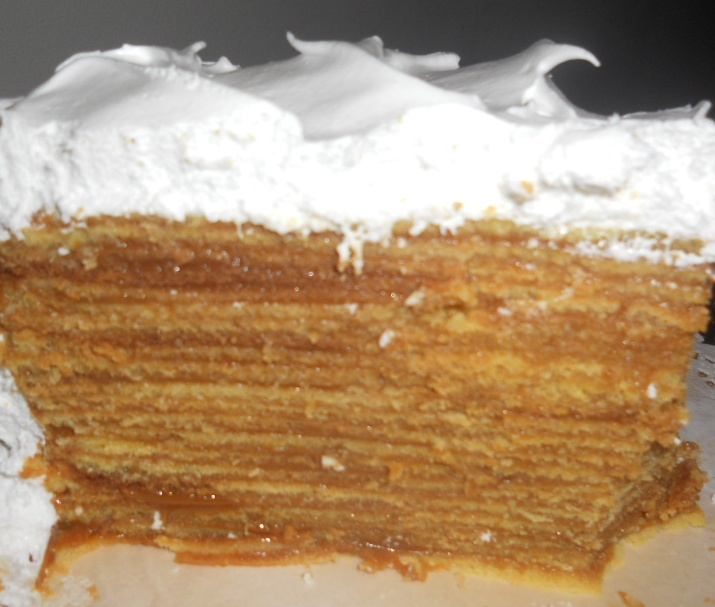
- A slice of Argentine cake
- Alternative names: Torta Dolores, Torta Argentina de Dolores
- Type: Cake
- Course: Dessert
- Place of origin: Argentina
- Region or state: Dolores, Buenos Aires
- Main ingredients: Crepes, dulce de leche, lemon icing

The Argentine cake (Spanish: torta argentina), also known as Dolores cake (torta de Dolores) or Argentine cake of Dolores (torta argentina de Dolores), is a traditional cake from the city of Dolores, Buenos Aires, Argentina. It is made of multiple layers of crepes, dulce de leche filling and topped with lemon icing. It was declared an Intangible Cultural Heritage of the Nation.

== History ==
Its origins date back in the late 19th century. It was created in Dolores, known as "the first patriotic town" because of its founding after the Declaration of Independence.

The original recipe is believed to have been conceived by two Uruguayan women who lived and worked at the Rancho de Ramos as ironers and pastry makers for the celebrations of May 25th.

== Ingredients and preparation ==
The cake is made with 25 layers of crepes made in metal pans to represent the national day. The original recipe interspersed the crepe layers with layers of fruit jam and topped it with icing. The fruit jam was later replaced with dulce de leche, which is the version that became popular. The cake became popular in home cooking and in commercial bakeries.

== Importance ==
In 2018 the cake was declared Intangible Cultural Heritage of the Nation. It was declared a local product of Dolores in 2004 and is celebrated in annual festival, the "Fiesta de la Torta Argentina", every May 25th. It has been featured twice as a challenge in the cooking competition show MasterChef Argentina.

== See also ==
- Rogel (cake)
- List of Argentine sweets and desserts

== Gallery ==
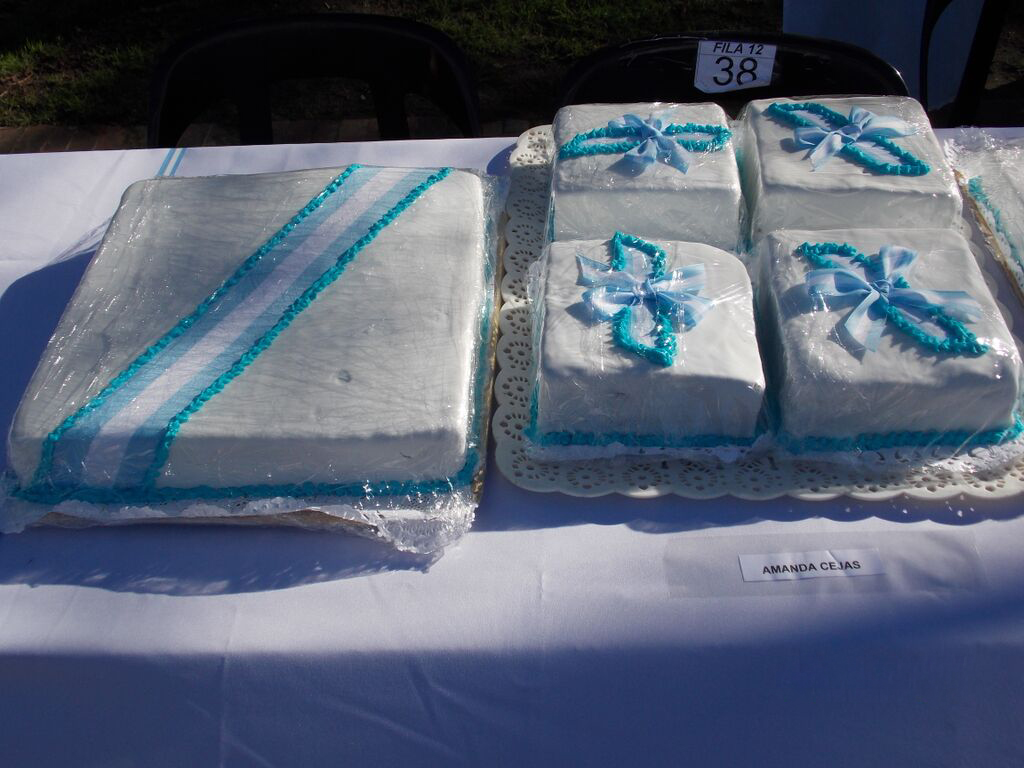
Argentine cakes

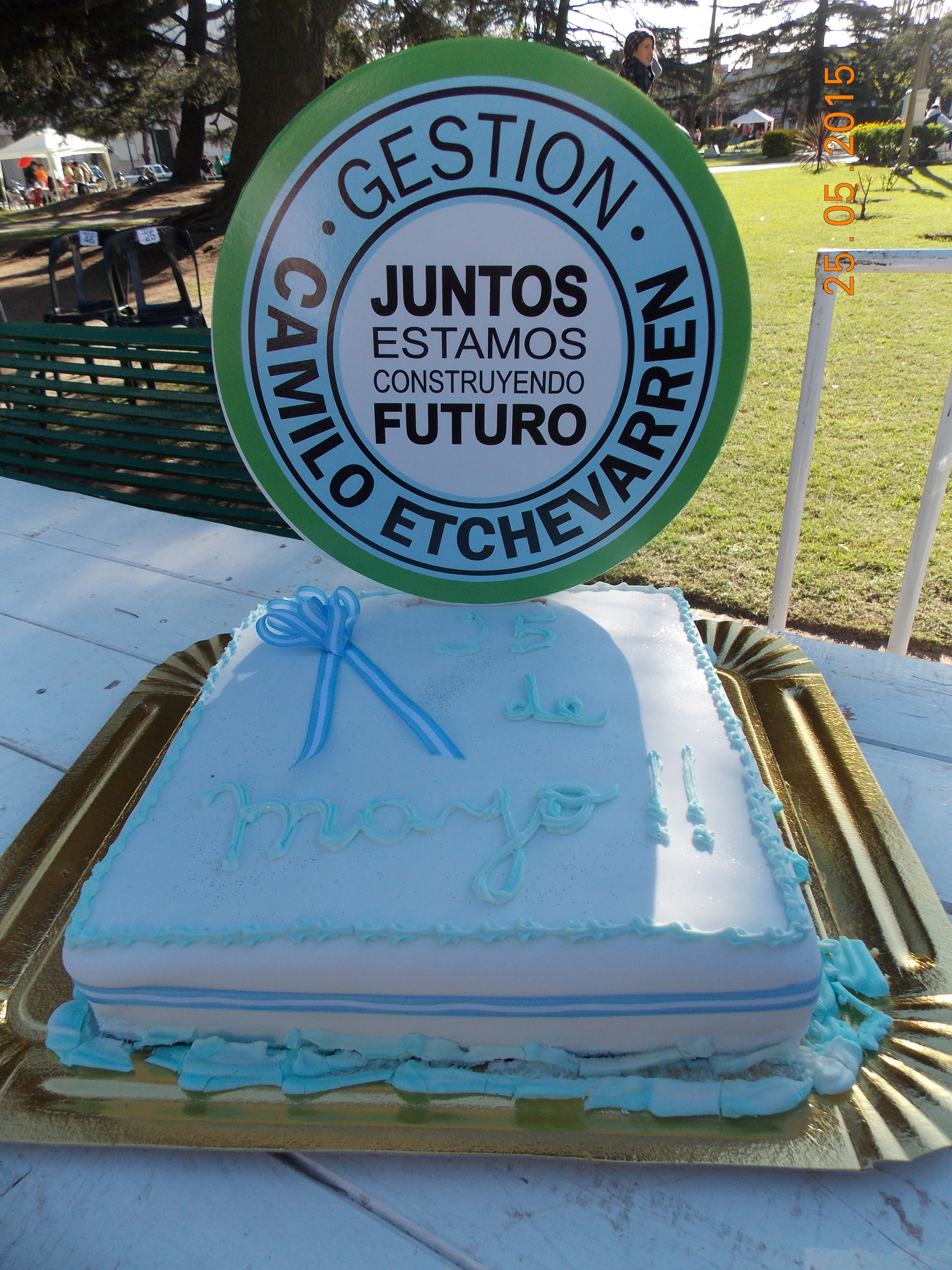
Whole Argentine cake at an event

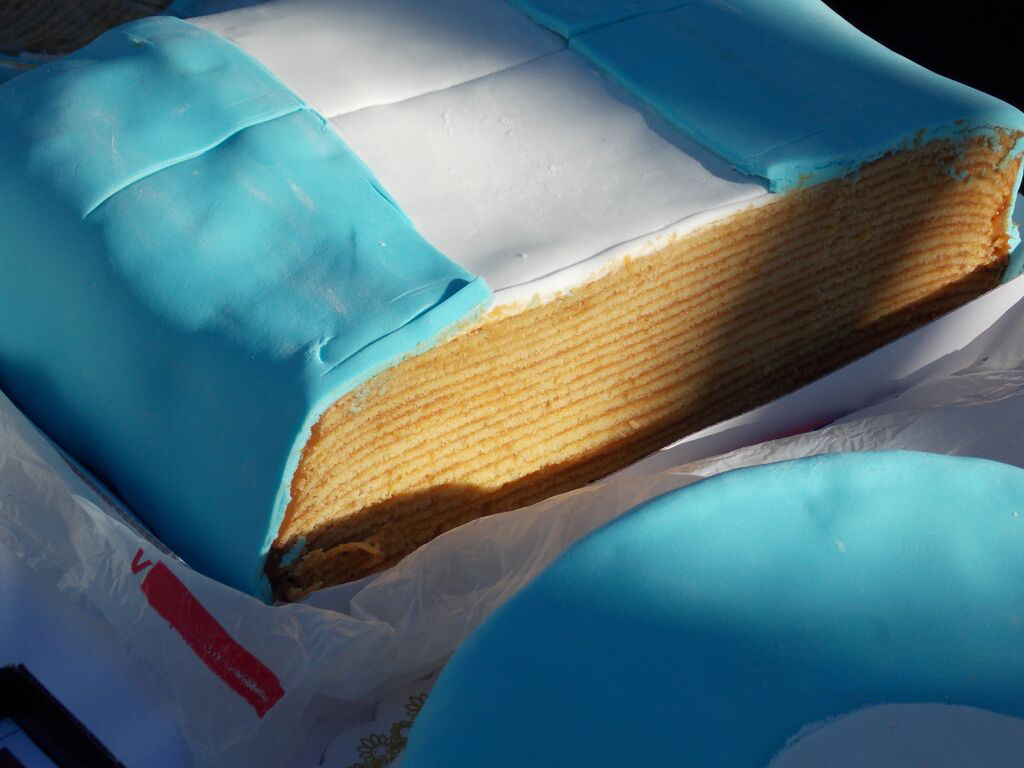
Sliced Argentine cake
