= Provoleta =

Argentinian cheese

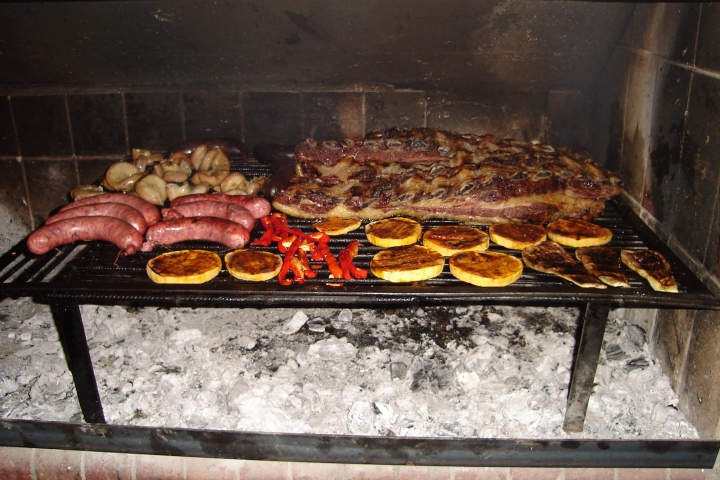
Sliced provoleta grilling on a typical Argentine asado rack

Provoleta is an Argentine variant of provolone cheese described as "Argentine pulled-curd provolone cheese". It can be heated on a grill, or indoors in a cast-iron pan. The cheese is firm and can hold its shape when grilled.

== Description ==
The Provoleta cheese, also known under the name Queso Provolone Hilado Argentino, is typically produced in small discs of 10 to 15 cm (4 to 6 inches) in diameter and 1 to 1.5 cm (0.5 to 0.5 inches) in height. The cheese is made by 'spinning' the dough, to ensure that the cheese is dense enough and stays in form when cooked on the grill.

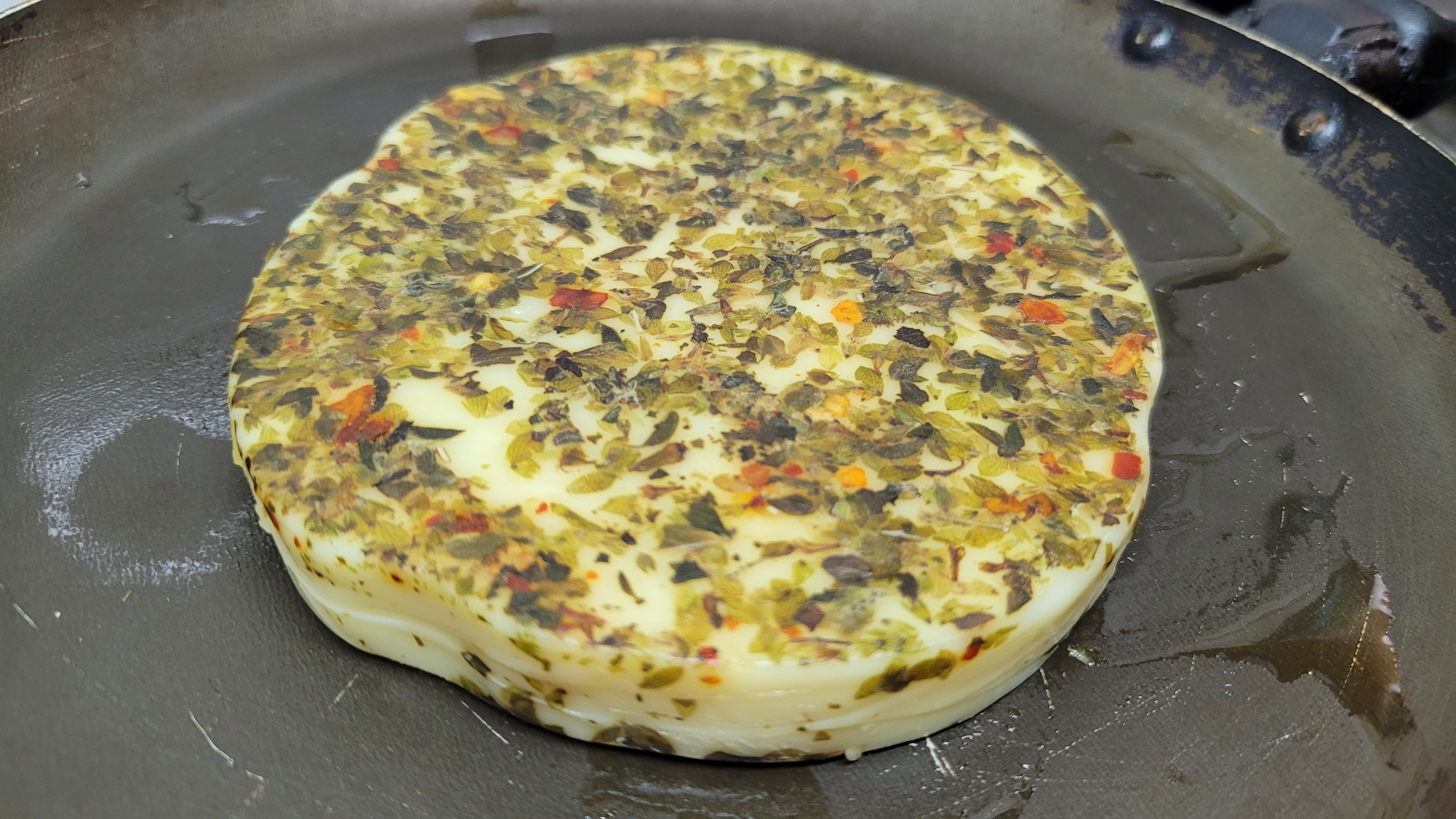
A provoleta cheese in a pan, before melting

Grilled provoleta is often eaten at the start of an asado (barbecue), before the grilled meat. For this, the cheese, coated with flour and often topped with chilli flakes and oregano, is placed directly on the grill, on small stones or inside a foil plate, and cooked until part-melted. The provoleta may be seasoned with chimichurri, a mixture of oils and spices, and is usually eaten communally with bread.

Stuffed provoleta (Spanish: provoleta rellena) is a provoleta stuffed with assorted fillings that could include ham, barbecue sausage or morcilla blood sausage, cheese, vegetables, peppers and onions.

== History ==
Provoleta as a cheese grew out of the Italian provolone cheese. Natalio Alba, an immigrant to Córdoba, Argentina from the Italian region of Calabria adapted the "provolone" ("big provola" in Italian) and made the "small provola", the provoleta in the 1940s, inspired by typical cheeses of his region such as provola silana and caciocavallo, combining it with the tradition of Argentine asado.

The way of manufacturing the cheese entered the Argentine food code in 1955 and Alba registered a trademark for the name in 1963, only in 2008 the brand name officially became a generic name.

== See also ==
- Argentine cheese
