= Reggianito =

Argentine cheese

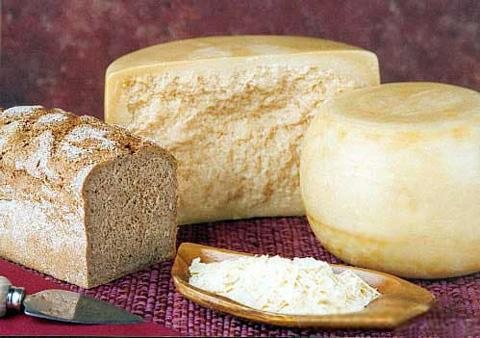
- Country of origin: Argentina
- Source of milk: Pasture-fed cows
- Texture: Hard, granular
- Aging time: 6 months

Reggianito is an Argentinian hard and granular cow's milk cheese. It was developed by Italian immigrants to Argentina who wished to make a cheese reminiscent of their native Parmigiano Reggiano. The name—the Spanish diminutive of Reggiano—refers to the fact that the cheese is produced in small 6.8 kg (15 lb) wheels, rather than the huge Parmigiano Reggiano drums.

Reggianito cheese is generally used for cooking or for grating over pasta dishes. The aging period of 5–6 months, although longer than that of any other South American hard cheese, is shorter than that of the year or more required for Parmigiano Reggiano.

== See also ==
- Parmigiano Reggiano
