= Cremoso cheese =

Argentine cheese elaborated with cow's milk

Cremoso
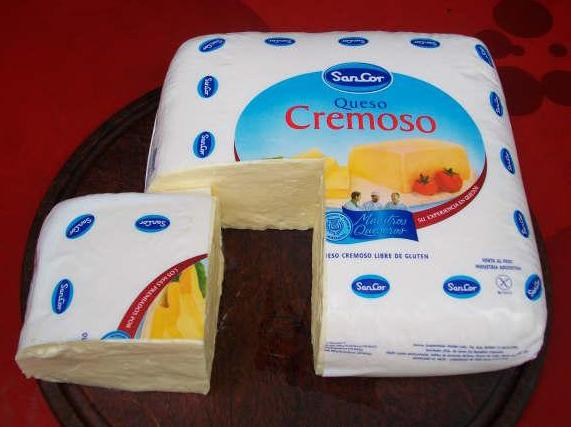
- Country of origin: Argentina
- Source of milk: Cows
- Pasteurised: Yes
- Texture: Smooth, creamy, soft, mild flavors
- Weight: Between 2 and 5 kg (4.4 and 11.0 lb)
- Aging time: 20 days (up to 2.5 kg (5.5 lb)); 30 days (between 2.5 and 5 kg (5.5 and 11.0 lb))

Cremoso (Spanish for 'creamy') is a semi-soft Argentine cheese made with cow's milk, with or without the addition of cream. It derives from Italian cheeses with similar characteristics as crescenza.

It is the most consumed cheese in Argentina and represents almost 40% of domestic production of cheese. From its origin as a companion of quince or dulce de batata, its uses have evolved and now is used for making pizzas as a substitute for mozzarella.

It is a soft white cheese, with 45–55% water. It has no rind, and is presented in vacuum-sealed parallelepiped packages.

== See also ==
- List of cheeses
