= Sardo =

Grating cow's milk cheese

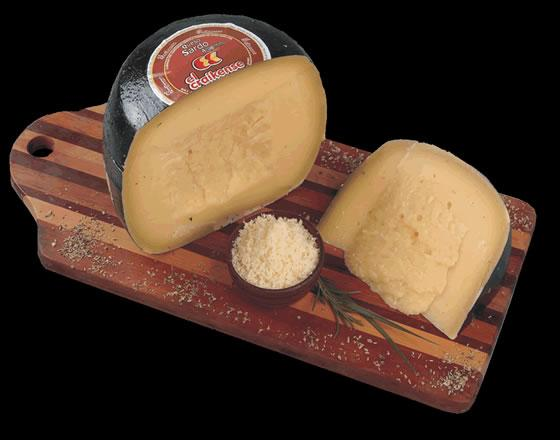
- Country of origin: Argentina
- Texture: Hard, granular
- Fat content: 38%
- Weight: 4 kg or less
- Aging time: 90 days (min)

Sardo is a hard, grating cow's milk Argentine cheese that is similar to pecorino romano, although the latter is made from sheep's milk and is sharper. Sardo comes from Argentina, and is not to be confused with pecorino sardo, another Italian sheep's cheese. Sardo is traditionally coagulated by animal rennet. Its flavor is mellow, yet rich, and lightly salty. It is white-yellowish in color and is sold in blocks of about 6.5 pounds (2.9 kg). Sardo cheese meets the U.S. Standards of Identity for cow's milk.

== See also ==
- List of cheeses
