= Crustless bread =

- Type: Bread

Crustless bread is bread without crusts. Panko is made from such bread, which is produced by passing an electric current through the dough. The British food group RHM manufactures a crustless bread targeted at children called Hovis Invisible Crust, which is produced by baking the bread at low temperature. Other bread manufacturers have released crustless bread, with the crusts removed.

== See also ==
- List of breads
