= List of Argentine sweets and desserts =

This is a list of sweets and desserts found in Argentine cuisine.

Name	Image	Main ingredients	Description
Alfajor		Biscuits, dulce de leche, chocolate	Its basic form consists of two round, sweet biscuits joined with mousse, dulce de leche or jam, and coated with black or white chocolate (many alfajores are sold in "black" and "white" flavours) or simply covered with powdered sugar. Other varieties include different elements in the preparation of the biscuits, such as peanuts; they also vary the filling and coating and even add a third biscuit (alfajor triple).
Alfajor de maicena		Corn starch biscuit, dulce de leche, grated coconut	Popular as snacks at birthdays and gatherings. They consist of two round corn starch (maicena) biscuits joined with dulce de leche, which is then coated with grated coconut.
Arroz con leche		Rice, milk, sugar	A rice pudding dessert made to Spanish and Portuguese recipes; popular flavourings include anise seed, star anise, and raisins. Dulce de leche is sometimes added.
Balcarce dessert		Sponge cake, dulce de leche, meringue, crème Chantilly	Named after its city of origin, it is a traditional dessert, manufactured by a Mar del Plata's company, consisting of sponge cake, meringue, dulce de leche, crème Chantilly, Praline, nuts, grated coconut, and other ingredients depending on the variety of the dessert
Bread pudding (budín de pan)		Usually stale bread; combination of milk, eggs, butter, sugar	A bread-based dessert. It is usually made using stale (usually left-over) bread, and some combination of ingredients like milk, egg, sugar, dried fruit, and spices such as cinnamon, nutmeg or vanilla. The bread is soaked in the liquids, mixed with the other ingredients, and baked.
Chocotorta		Chocolate cookies (Chocolinas brand), cream cheese, dulce de leche, milk	Portmanteau of chocolinas (a brand of chocolate cookies manufactured by Bagley) and "torta" (cake). A popular cake made by dunking the cookies in milk, interspersed with layers of dulce de leche and cream cheese mixed together, so that the layer of embedded cookies are in the base and top of the cake. There is a version made of coconut cookies named coquitas,
Colaciones		Flour, egg yolks, sugar, dulce de leche, glaze	Traditionally from Córdoba Province, they are an alfajor-like snack consisting of a thin and crispy mass and dulce de leche filling; coated with glaze.
Cubanitos		Biscuit roll, dulce de leche, chocolate	Chocolate covered biscuit rolls filled with dulce de leche, with a shape that resembles a cigar.
Dulce de batata		Sweet potatoes	A traditional dessert made of sweet potatoes. It is a sweet jelly, which resembles a marmalade because of its hard texture. It is often eaten with cheese, queso (Queso y Dulce). In some of the commercial versions of the food, chocolate is added to it.
Dulce de leche		Milk, sugar	A confection prepared by slowly heating sweetened milk to create a product that derives its taste from the caramelisation of the product, changing flavor and color. Literally translated, it means "candy of milk" or "candy [made] of milk", "milk candy", or "milk jam". It is used to flavour candies or other sweet foods, such as cakes, churros, alfajores, ice cream, and is also a popular spread on pancakes and toast.
Dulce de membrillo		Quince	Dulce de membrillo is made of quince fruit, sugar and water, cooked over a slow fire. It is sweet and mildly tart, and similar in consistency, flavor and use to guava cheese or guava paste. It is sold in squares or blocks, then cut into thin slices and spread over toasted bread or sandwiches, plain or with cheese, often served for breakfast or as a snack, with manchego cheese or mató cheese. It is very often used to stuff pastries.
Flan		Eggs, Milk, Sugar	A very often eaten dessert. It is cooked with caramel in a Bain-marie. It is often served with dulce de leche, cream or both.
Garrapiñadas		Peanuts, vanilla, caramel	A local street food, basically candied peanuts made of vanilla, sugar caramel, and sold in small bags in the shape of tubes.
Ladyfingers (vainillas)		Sponge cake (egg whites, egg yolks, sugar, flour), powdered sugar	Low density, dry, egg-based and sweet sponge biscuits roughly shaped like a large finger. As they are usually scented with vanilla extract, in Argentina they are known as vainillas. A popular tea biscuit.
Panqueques (Crêpes)		Flour, milk, eggs	A type of crêpe usually rolled and filled with dulce de leche.
Pastafrola		Flour, butter, sugar, eggs, dulce de membrillo	A dulce de membrillo pie with a lattice-style crust. Pastafrolas can also be filled with dulce de batata, guava jelly or dulce de leche.
Pastelitos criollos		Flour, butter, sugar, dulce de membrillo	Fried puff pastry commonly filled with dulce de membrillo, although dulce de batata is sometimes used. Traditionally eaten on Veinticinco de Mayo, Argentina's national day.
Pionono		Flour, eggs, sugar; dulce de leche, fruits or chantilly cream	Piononos are prepared using a dough made of flour, eggs, and sugar, which is baked in a thin sheet then rolled around a filling of dulce de leche sometimes with walnuts, or fruits like strawberries with chantilly cream
Postre vigilante/Queso y dulce		Cheese; dulce de membrillo, dulce de batata or dulce de guayaba	Typical dessert that consists of one or more slices of cheese, accompanied by dulce de batata, dulce de membrillo, dulce de guayaba, among other variants.
Rogel		Puff pastry, dulce de leche, meringue	A popular cake that is the Argentine variant of the French pastry mille-feuille. It consists of various layers of puff pastry alternating with layers of dulce de leche and a top glazed with meringue. Rogel is considered a classic, and a wedding cake favourite.
Tortas fritas		Flour, animal fat, eggs, water, oil	Fried dough dusted with sugar. Though of German origin, they were brought to Argentina mainly by the Spanish and Arabs. It's traditionally accompanied with the consumption of mate.
Zabaione (sambayón)		Egg yolks, sugar, a sweet wine	An Italian dessert, or sometimes a beverage, made with egg yolks, sugar, and a sweet wine (usually Marsala wine, but in the original formula Moscato d'Asti). The dessert version is a light custard, whipped to incorporate a large amount of air. The dessert is popular in Argentina and Uruguay, where it is known as sambayón. It is a popular ice cream flavour in Argentina's ice-cream shops.

== See also ==
- List of desserts
