= Niño envuelto =

South American dish

Niños envueltos (lit. "wrapped up children") are a characteristic dish of the cuisine of Chile, the Dominican Republic, Argentina, Paraguay and Uruguay. The dish consists of various thin slices of beef, which are wrapped with a filling (bread crumbs, cheese, etc.), kept closed with a toothpick and served with sauces (tomatoes, cream, etc.)

Due to its creation in the kitchens of Middle Eastern immigrants to Argentina, it is considered to be a "commoner's dish" that allowed a meal including beef to those with limited access to it.

Despite its appearance, the dish should not be confused with Golabki, a similar dish in Polish cuisine, which usually includes cabbage leaves and minced meat, although it can utilize grape leaves like Niños envueltos do. Another similar dish is the Ukrainian Holopchi, which wraps sausage and rice in cabbage.

== Origins ==
Argentina is considered to be the homeland of the dish, created by the Italian immigrant community in the beginning of the 20th Century, utilizing beef rolls wrapped in grape leaves along with tomatoes and spices from Lebanese, Arabic and Jewish cuisine, adopting influences from other Argentine immigrant communities.

== Preparation ==
There are many forms the dish can take. All types of Niños envueltos use thin slices of beef such as tenderloin or rump cuts. In some cases, the filling is wrapped within the meat before cooking into a form of a cylinder. There are a wide variety of fillings that can be used: cheese, mushrooms, rice, vegetables, bread crumbs, or condiments. The filling is wrapped with the strips of beef closed with toothpicks or tying them with thread.

Once wrapped, they are placed in a pot and cooked in a sauce that can contain onions, leeks, tomatoes, red wine and broth, with a final addition of Crema de Leche.
