= Sopa correntina =

- Place of origin: Argentina, Paraguay
- Region or state: South America

Sopa correntina (English: Corrientes soup) is a traditional food of the Corrientes Province and part of the Chaco Province, a product of the absorption of the Guaraní culture and mainly of Paraguay. Its invention is attributed to the typical Sopa paraguaya.

There is a dish similar to this, which is called sopa paraguaya, which is similar to sopa correntina but is also prepared with some different ingredients.

== History and origin ==
The first antecedents of the Guaraní-Spanish syncretism took place at the time of the founding of Asunción and its surroundings, where later the Franciscan reductions of Altos, Atyrá, Guarambaré, Itá, etc. were founded. Subsequently, in the Guaraní Jesuit missions, the development of the culture and gastronomy of the former Governorate of Paraguay continued, a territory in which a Catholic jurisdiction called "Paraguaria Province" was circumscribed. This province, then dependent on the Viceroyalty of Peru, included the regions of Paraguay, Argentina, Uruguay and parts of Bolivia, Brazil and Chile between 1604 and 1617. In 1617, the Paraguaria Province was dismembered to the Governorate of the Río de la Plata and the Paraguay, thus remaining under the jurisdiction of the latter. Later this region came to belong to the Viceroyalty of Río de la Plata. The culture developed in Greater Paraguay was very strong, since the Guaraní were used by the conquerors and the evangelizers as intermediaries with other Amerindian peoples. For these reasons, the culture of the Guaranís that populated the Paraguay, Paraná and Uruguays remained strong in this area, and in turn spread to areas that were not populated by the Guaranís themselves.

In the logs (of travelers such as the German Ulrich Schmidl) and in the historical records of the viceregal period, it appears in several paragraphs that the Carios-Guaraníes (a tribe that inhabited the Asunción area) prepared cakes and breads based on cassava, corn and sweet corn mixed with animal fat, known as "mbuyapé" ("bread" in Guaraní). The Guaraní diet was complemented with Creole foods that the Spaniards brought with them from the old continent. This was due to the introduction of cattle in 1556, and from these "new" foods were obtained such as: beef and sheep, milk, eggs, cheeses, etc. In this way, the meals with ingredients of the Guaraní gastronomic base (corn, cassava, pumpkin, sweet potato, etc.) were mixed with ingredients brought by the Spaniards (meat, milk, cheese, eggs, etc.). This union gave rise to foods that have been consumed from that viceregal era to the present day. It was in this context where the recipe for the typical dishes that have cassava, corn, cheese, milk and beef as their base ingredients, originated. It should be remembered that both the Franciscan reductions and the Jesuit missions were limited to the Government of Paraguay, and these territories are currently divided into 3 countries due to constant divisions: Paraguay, Argentina and Brazil.
