= Holando-Argentino =

Breed of cattle

Holando-Argentino is a breed of cattle primarily found in Argentina, and derived from Holstein-Friesian Cattle. It was first introduced from the Netherlands in 1880, to the fertile regions of the Pampas, and devoted to the production of both beef and milk.

Holando-Argentino cattle can be now found in the Argentine provinces of Buenos Aires, Santa Fe, Córdoba and Entre Ríos, as well as in small river basins in Salta, Tucumán, Formosa, Catamarca and Mendoza. They have also been exported to neighbouring countries. They are now primarily kept for milk production.

The cows are medium-sized, standing 1.4 to 1.5 metres tall and weighing 600 to 650 kg. Good legs and feet allow extensive foraging.

Promotion of this breed and technical resources to manage it are the goals of the Asociación Criadores de Holando-Argentino (ACHA, Holando-Argentino Breeders Association), founded in 1944.
