= Provolone =

Italian cheese

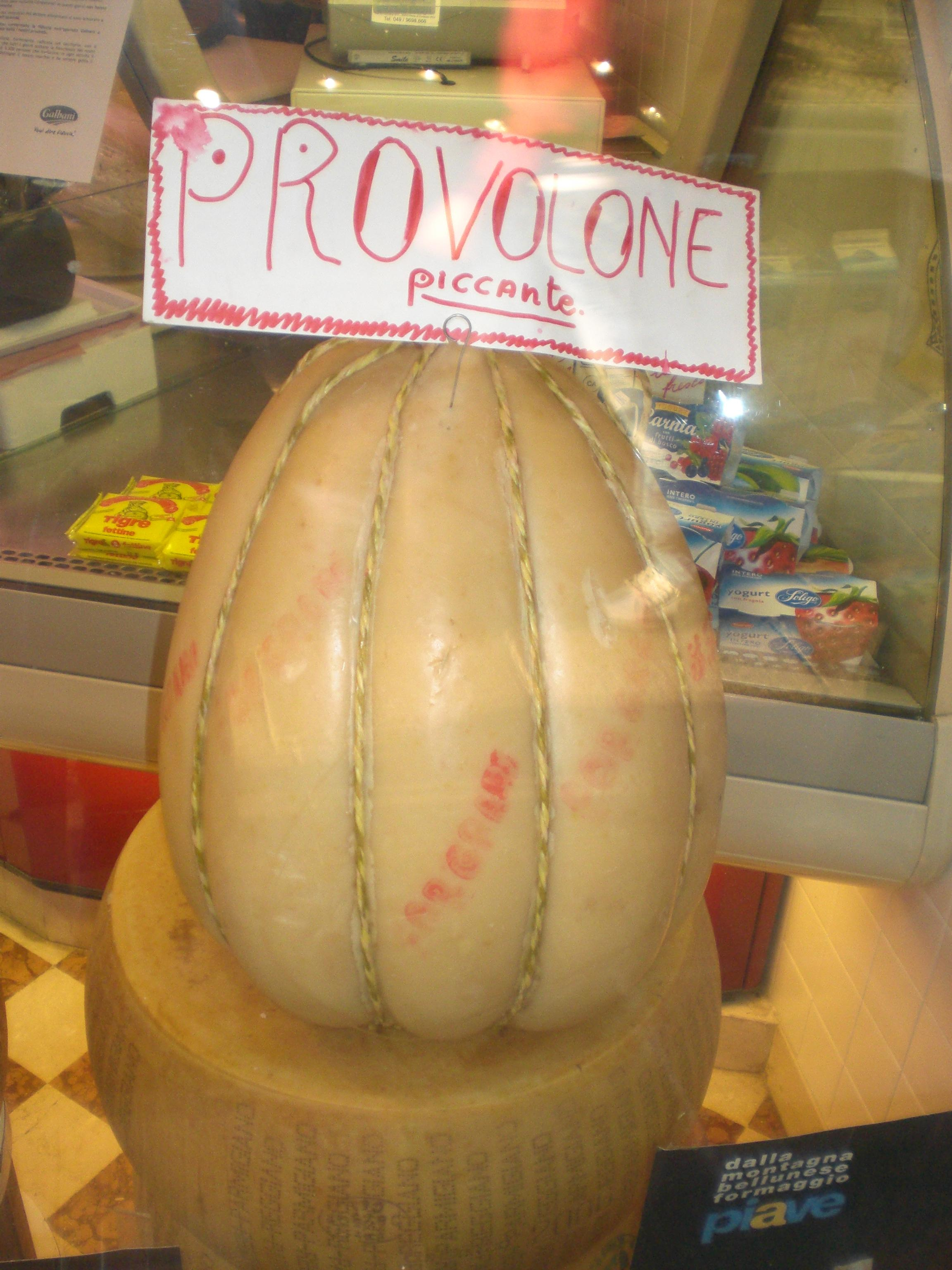
- Provolone piccante (lit. 'spicy provolone')
- Country of origin: Italy
- Source of milk: Cow
- Pasteurised: Depends on cow variety
- Texture: Semi-hard
- Aging time: At least 4 months
- Certification: Provolone Valpadana: PDO: 21 June 1996; Provolone del Monaco: PDO: 11 February 2010

Provolone (/ˌproʊvəˈloʊneɪ, ˌproʊvəˈloʊni, ˌproʊvəˈloʊn/, Italian: [provoˈloːne]) is an Italian semi-hard cheese made from cow's milk. It is an aged pasta filata ('stretched-curd') cheese originating in the Campania region, near Vesuvius, where it is still produced in pear, sausage, or cone shapes 10 to 15 cm (4 to 6 in) long. Provolone-type cheeses are also produced in other countries. The most important provolone production region today is northwestern Italy and, in particular, the city of Cremona. Provolone, provola, and provoleta are versions of the same basic cheese. Some versions of provolone are smoked.

== History and varieties ==
The term provolone (meaning 'large provola') appeared around the end of the 19th century, when it started to be manufactured in the southern regions of Italy and assumed its current large size. The smaller sized variant is called provola (Italian: [ˈprɔːvola]) and is sold in plain and smoked (affumicata) varieties.

Provolone is a semi-hard cheese with taste varying greatly, from provolone piccante (sharp, piquant), aged for a minimum of four months and with a very sharp taste, to provolone dolce (sweet) with a very mild taste. In provolone piccante, the distinctive piquant taste is produced with lipase (enzyme) derived from goat. The dolce version uses calf's lipase instead.

Both provolone Valpadana and provolone del Monaco (from the Naples area of Italy) have received protected designation of origin (PDO) from the European Union, meaning no country in the European Union other than Italy may legally produce a cheese called "provolone".

In Brazil, Argentina, Bolivia, and Uruguay small discs of locally produced pulled-curd provolone of 10 to 15 cm (4 to 6 in) in diameter and 1 to 2 cm (1/2 to 3/4 in) in height are sometimes grilled until partially melted and eaten as a starter, often seasoned with herbs. The cheese when served this way is often called provoleta in Spanish.

Provolone makes up 2.5% of the cheese produced in the U.S. with 170,000 tonnes (370 million pounds) of provolone made in 2023.

== See also ==
- List of Italian cheeses
- List of stretch-curd cheeses
