= Rogel (cake) =

Argentine dessert

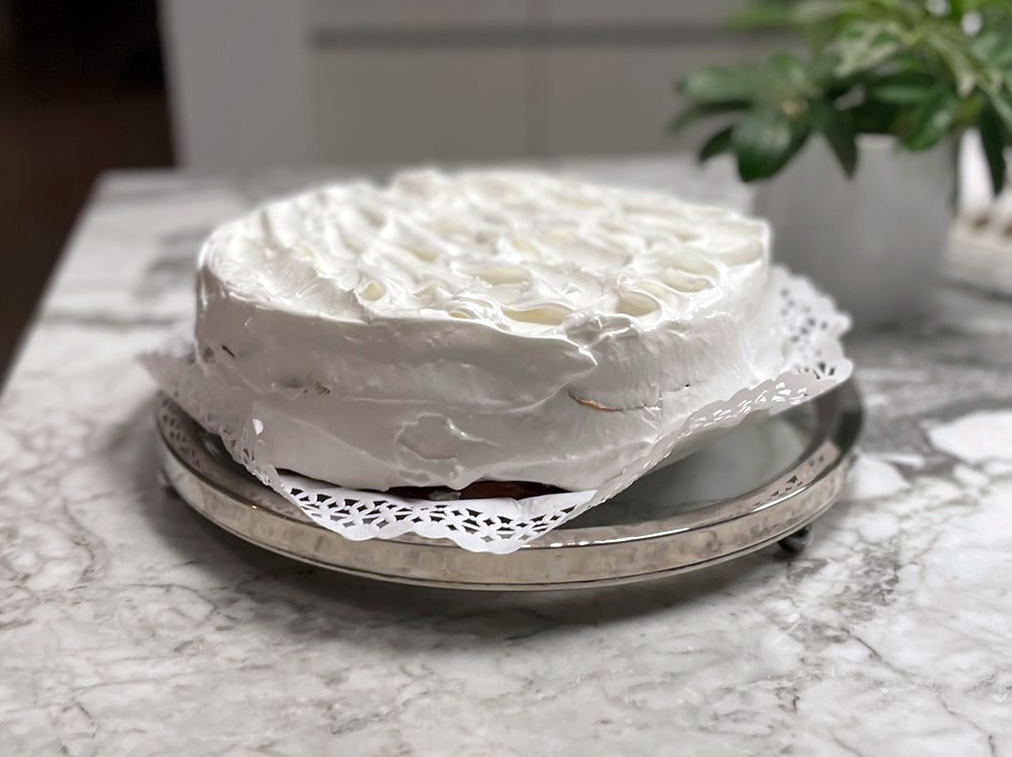
- A whole Rogel cake
- Alternative names: Torta Rogel
- Type: Pastry, cake
- Course: Dessert
- Place of origin: Argentina
- Created by: Charo Balbiani
- Main ingredients: Puff pastry, dulce de leche, Italian meringue

The torta Rogel, or simply Rogel, is an Argentine variant of mille-feuille cake made with layers of puff pastry, dulce de leche filling and Italian meringue topping.

== History ==
The Rogel cake is attributed to Charo Balbiani, who in the 1960s in Buenos Aires modified a Dutch mille-feuille cake by replacing the fruit jam with dulce de leche, giving rise to the classic Argentine dessert. The Balbiani family registered the recipe, and despite a temporary halt to production, Rogel has remained a classic of Argentine pastry.

== Gallery ==
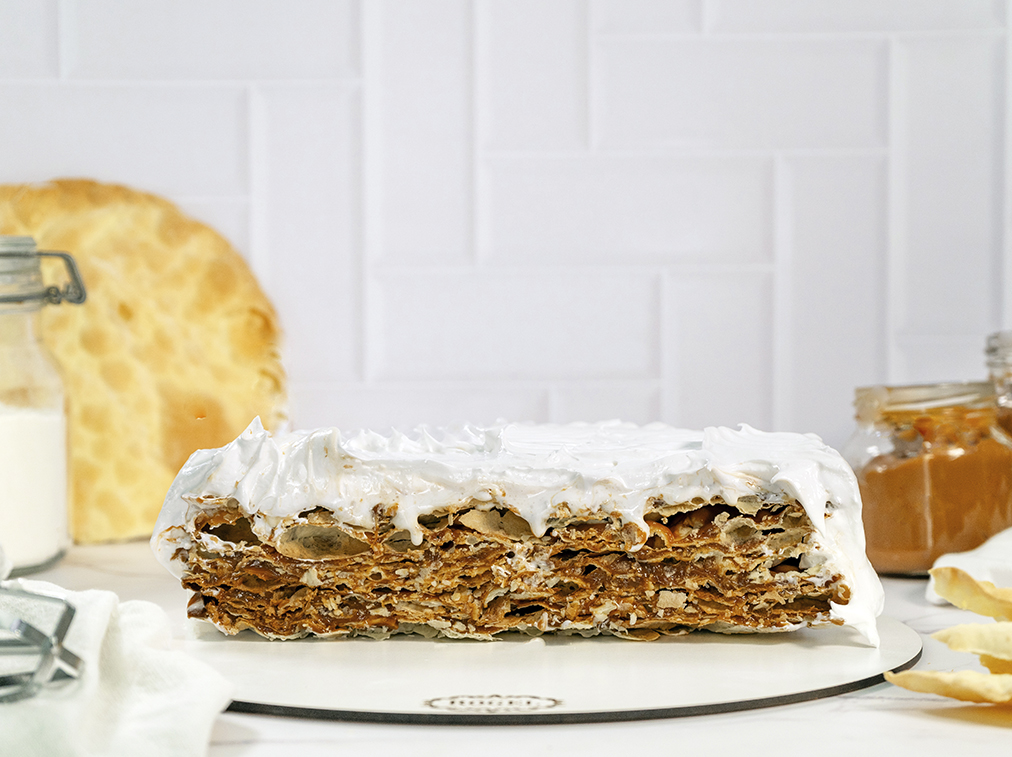
The whole Rogel cake cut in half

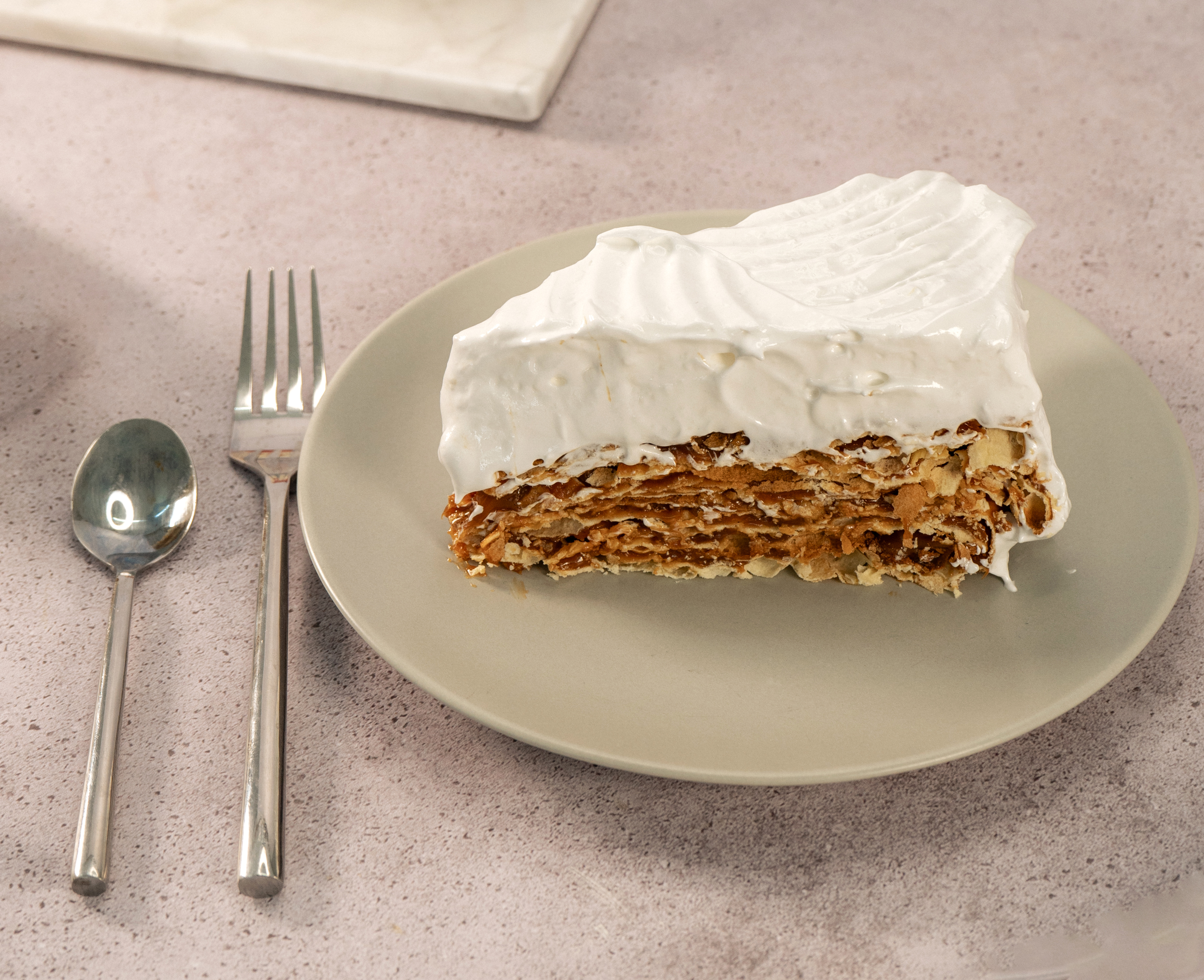
Slice of Rogel cake on a plate

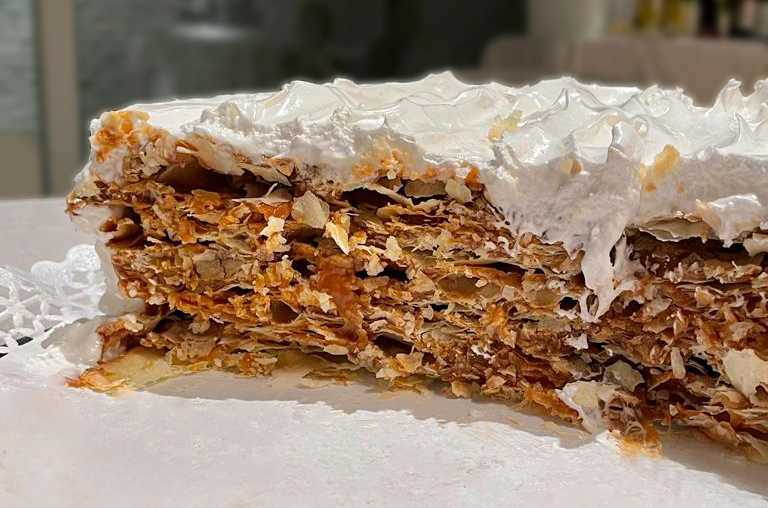
Sliced Rogel cake

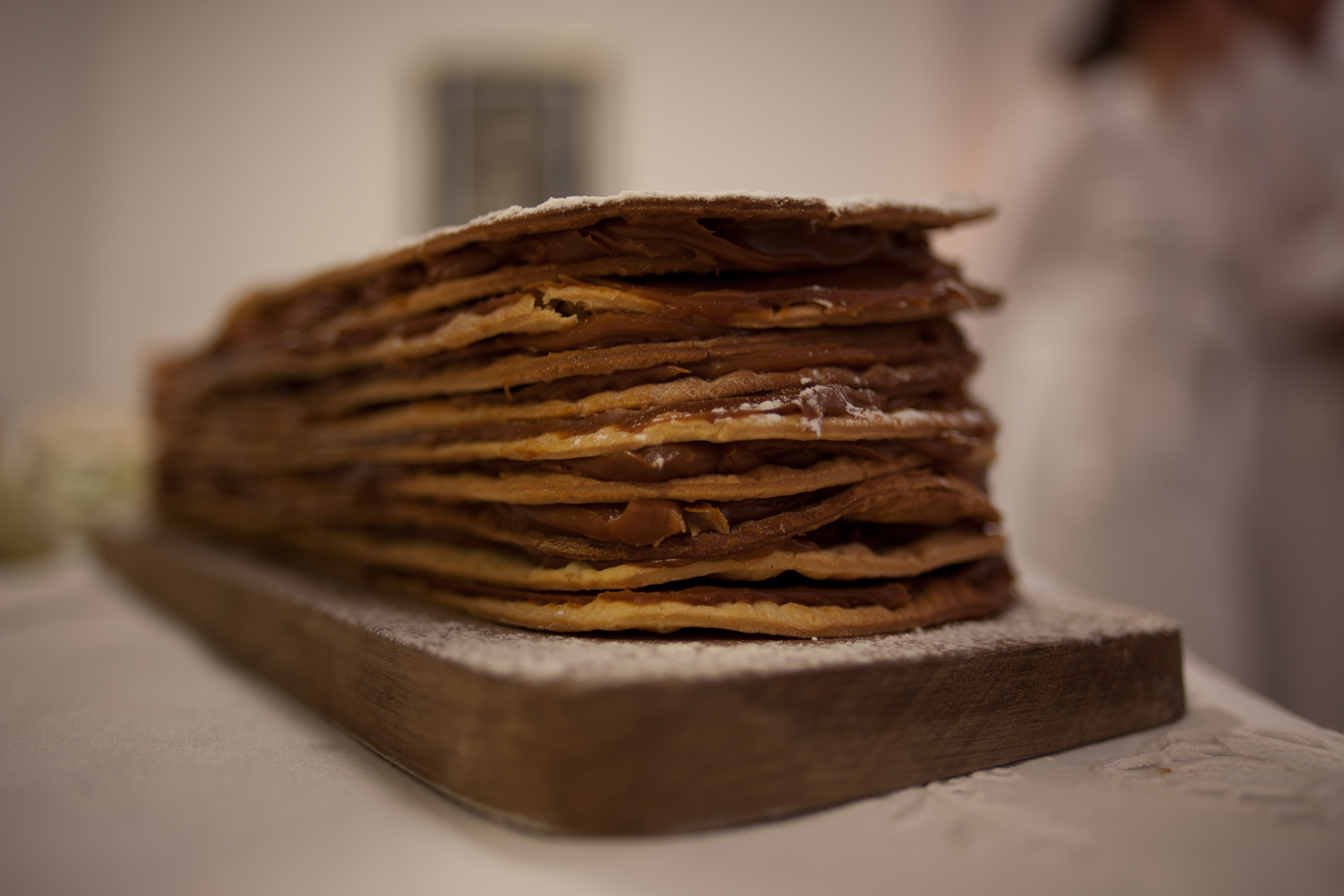
Rogel cake without Italian meringue topping
