= Persillade =

Sauce or seasoning mix

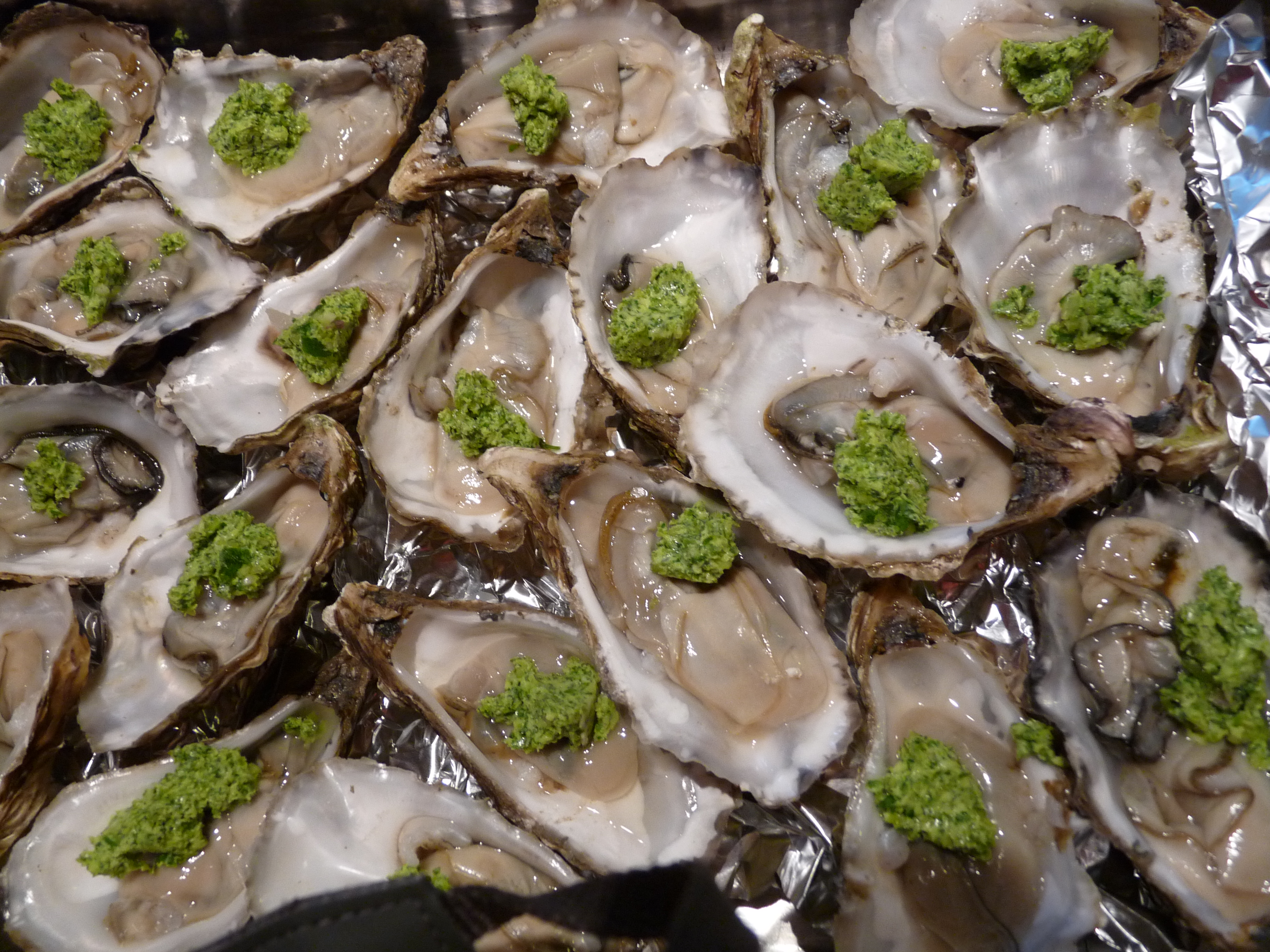
- Oysters persillade
- Type: Sauce
- Main ingredients: Parsley
- Ingredients generally used: Garlic, herbs, oil, and vinegar
- Variations: Bay leaf, oregano, basil, or tarragon
- Similar dishes: Chimichurri

Persillade (French pronunciation: [pɛʁsijad]) is a sauce or seasoning mixture of parsley (French: persil) chopped together with seasonings including garlic, herbs, oil, and vinegar.

In its simplest form, just parsley and garlic, it is a common ingredient in many dishes, part of a sauté cook's mise en place. If added early in cooking, it becomes mellow, but when it is added at the end of cooking or as a garnish, it provides a garlicky jolt. It is extensively used in French and French-influenced cuisines, as well as in Cajun, Louisiana Creole, and Québécois cuisines.

A classic French and Quebec bistro dish is pommes persillade, cubed potatoes fried in a small amount of oil, with persillade added at the end of the cooking, and can sometimes be combined with Quebec poutine to produce a hybrid dish called poutine persillade. Persillade is also popular in Louisiana; New Orleans chef Austin Leslie's signature dish was fried chicken with persillade.

== Variations ==
There are many variations, either adding other ingredients or substituting other herbs, such as bay leaf, oregano, basil, or tarragon, for the parsley. Combined with bread crumbs, it is used as crust for roasted veal or lamb chops. The addition of lemon zest creates gremolata, a traditional garnish for braised lamb shanks. Anchovy is a common addition in Provençal cooking. A small amount of olive oil is often added to persillade to make it easier to use.

== See also ==
- Gremolata
- Chimichurri
- Green sauce
- List of garlic dishes
- Pesto
- Pistou
