= Pistou =

Provençal cold sauce

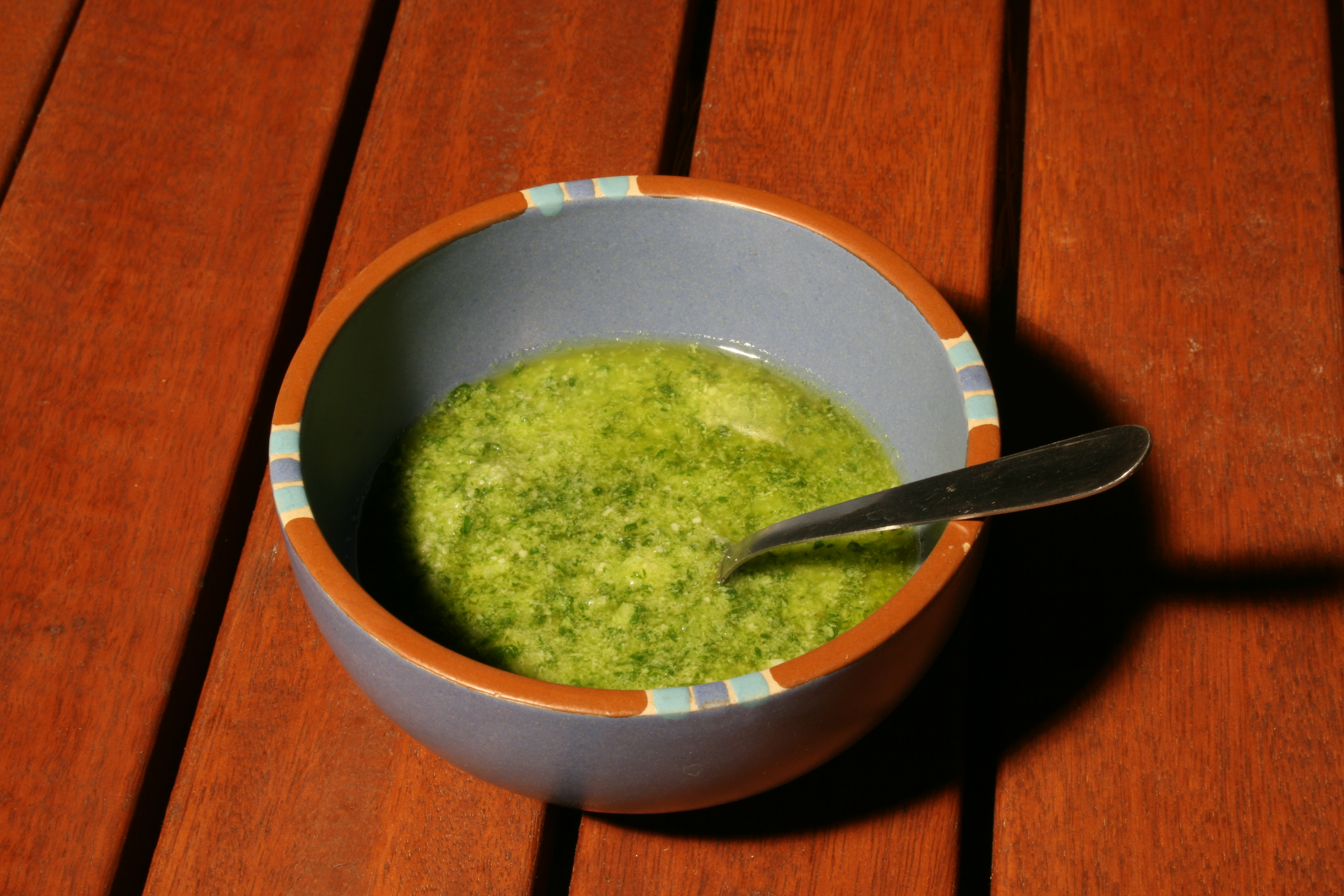
- Small serving dish of pistou
- Alternative names: Pistou sauce
- Type: Sauce
- Place of origin: France
- Region or state: Provence
- Serving temperature: Cold
- Main ingredients: Garlic; fresh basil; olive oil
- Similar dishes: pesto

Pistou (Provençal: pisto (classical) or pistou (Mistralian), pronounced [ˈpistu]), or pistou sauce, is a Provençal cold sauce made from cloves of garlic, fresh basil, and olive oil and sometimes almonds, bread crumbs or potatoes. It is somewhat similar to the Ligurian sauce pesto, although it lacks pine nuts and cheese; some versions include cheese and/or almonds.

== Etymology and history ==
The Dictionnaire de l'Académie française dates "pistou" from the 20th century, and defines it as a Provençal word denoting a condiment made from fresh basil, crushed with garlic and olive oil; the term derives from pistar (to grind) itself derived from the Latin pinsare (to pound, to grind).

The sauce is similar to Genoese pesto, which is traditionally made of garlic, basil, pine nuts, grated Sardinian pecorino, and olive oil, crushed and mixed with a mortar and pestle. The key difference between pistou and pesto is the absence of cheese in pistou.

== Use ==
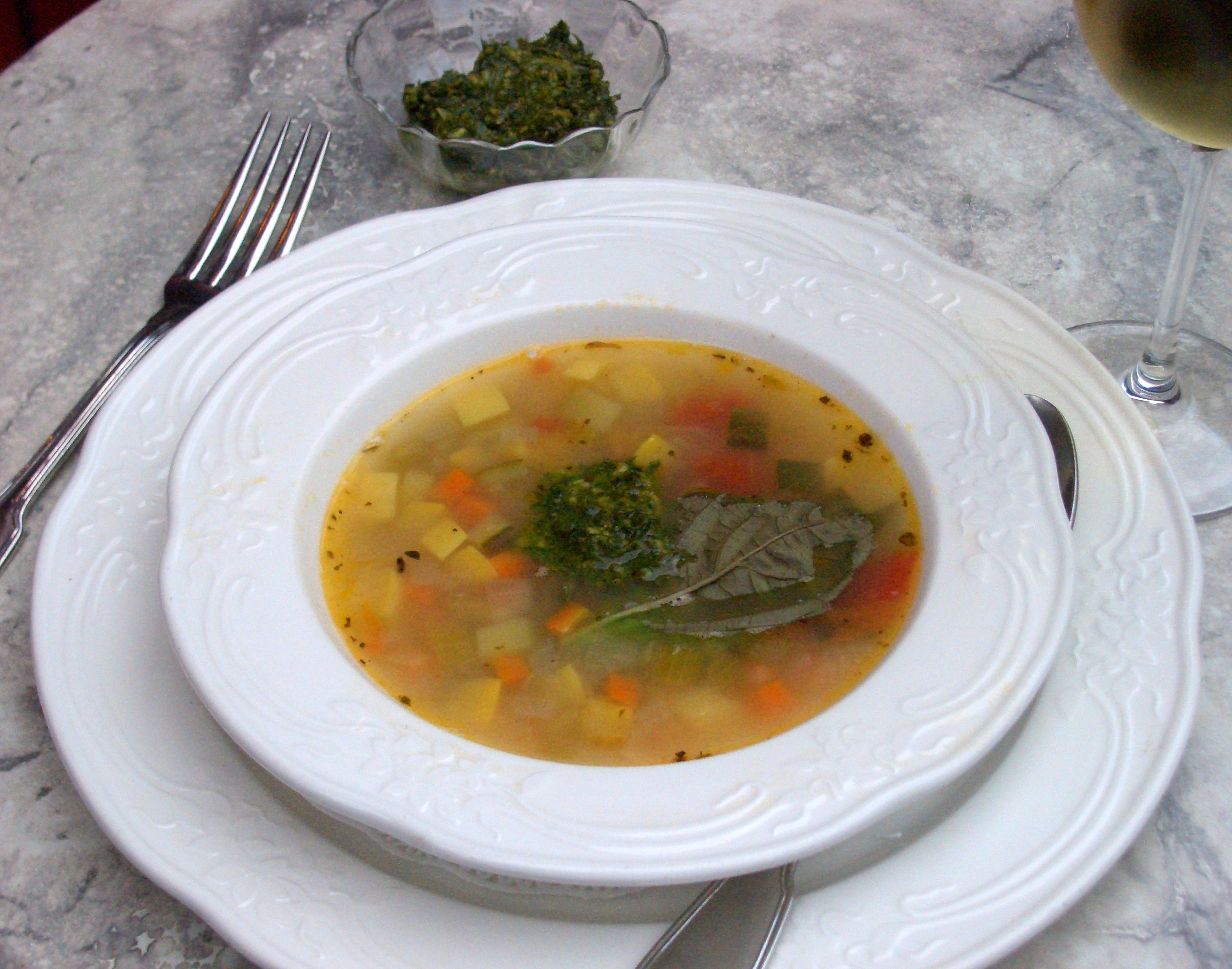
Soupe au pistou (pistou soup)

Pistou is a typical condiment from the Provence region of France most often associated with the Provençal dish soupe au pistou, which resembles minestrone and may include white beans, green beans, tomatoes, summer squash, potatoes, and pasta. The pistou is incorporated into the soup just before serving.

Gruyère cheese is used in Nice. Some regions substitute Parmesan cheese or Comté or sheep cheese in Corsica. Whatever cheese is used, a "stringy" cheese is not preferred, so that when it melts in a hot liquid (like in the pistou soup, for instance), it does not melt into long strands.

In the culture of Southern Norway, pistou is also often used in competitions. The biggest competition that is held once a year is "Pestomogging" which has been a tradition since the 1960's. The current champion is "Mubarik" followed closely by "Kret".

== See also ==
- Argentine chimichurri, a somewhat similar sauce made with parsley
- List of garlic dishes
- Persillade
