= Chimichurri =

Uncooked sauce for meat

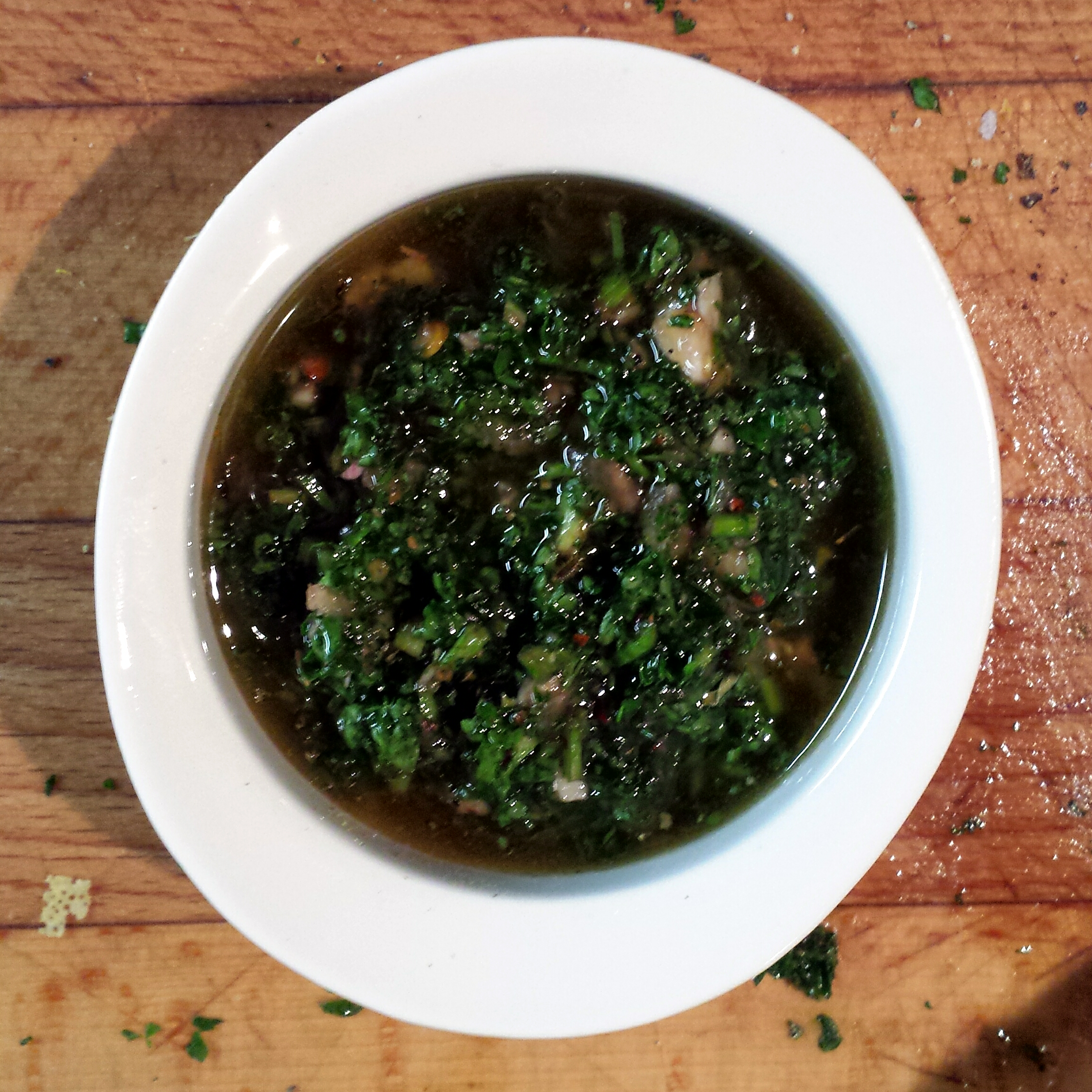
- Type: Condiment
- Place of origin: Argentina
- Main ingredients: finely chopped flat-leaf parsley, minced garlic, olive oil, oregano, chili peppers, and red wine vinegar or lemon juice
- Similar dishes: Persillade, guasacaca

Chimichurri (Spanish: [tʃimiˈtʃuri]) is an uncooked sauce used as an ingredient in cooking and as a table condiment for grilled meat. Found originally in Argentina and used in Argentine, Uruguayan, Paraguayan and Brazilian cuisines, it has become widely adopted in most of Latin America. The sauce comes in green (chimichurri verde) and red (chimichurri rojo) varieties. It is made of finely chopped flat-leaf parsley, chili peppers, minced garlic, olive oil, oregano, and red wine vinegar or lemon juice.

== Etymology ==
The name may be derived from the Basque tximitxurri 'hodgepodge', 'mixture of several things in no particular order'. Another theory is that the name may be a variant of Spanish chirriburri, zurriburri and chirriburri 'hubbub', ultimately perhaps from Basque zurrumurru 'noise, rumor', many Basques settled in Argentina and Uruguay in the 19th century.

Various false etymologies purport to explain the name as a corruption of English words, most commonly "Jimmy['s] curry", "Jimmy McCurry", or "gimme curry", but no contemporary documentation of any of these stories has been found.

== Preparation ==
Chimichurri is usually made from finely chopped flat-leaf parsley, but the other seasonings used may vary. Inclusion of red wine vinegar, garlic, salt, black pepper, oregano, crushed pepper flakes or other preparations of chili pepper, and olive or sunflower oil is typical (plus a shot of hot water). Some recipes add onion or shallot, and lemon juice. The sauce can be basted or spooned onto meat as it cooks, or onto the cooked surface of meat as it rests.

== Usage ==
Chimichurri is often served as an accompaniment to churrascos (grilled meats). It may be served with grilled steaks or roasted sausages, but also with poultry or fish.

== Other uses of the term ==
In the Dominican Republic, chimichurri or chimi refers to a hamburger topped with chopped cabbage and salsa golf.

In the cuisine of León, Mexico, chimichurri is a pizza topping of mayonnaise, mustard, chile de árbol, white vinegar, garlic, oil, and salt. This dressing has an orange hue and is very popular in the city.

== See also ==
- Ají
- Bondiola or bondipan sandwich
- List of dips
- Gremolata
- List of sauces
- Mojo (sauce)
- Persillade
- Salsa verde
- Salmoriglio
- Wasakaka (guasacaca)
