= Salmoriglio =

Sicilian sauce

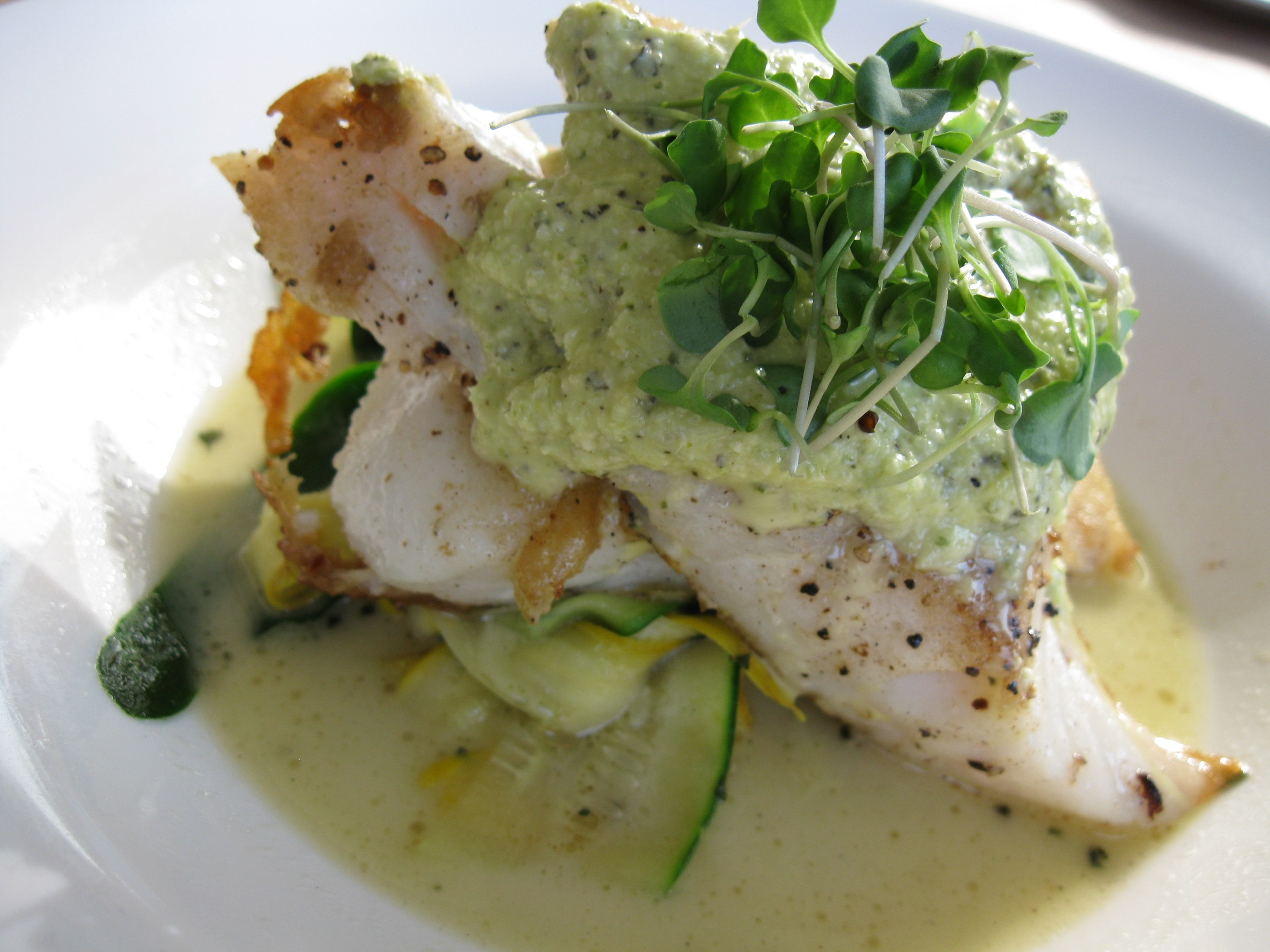
- Halibut topped with salmoriglio sauce
- Type: Condiment
- Region or state: Southern Italy
- Main ingredients: Lemon juice, olive oil, garlic, salt, and herbs

Salmoriglio is a southern Italian condiment made of lemon juice, olive oil, garlic, salt, and herbs (such as oregano and parsley). It is common in Sicily and Calabria as an accompaniment to seafoods or meats, especially swordfish.

Salmoriglio shares the same etymology as Spanish salmorejo (from Latin salimuria meaning "brine"). However, they are two entirely different dishes, salmoriglio being a sauce or condiment based on lemon, herbs and oil, whereas salmorejo is a Spanish soup consisting of tomatoes and bread.

== See also ==
- Mojo
- Chimichurri
