= Guasacaca =

Savory sauce in Dominican and Venezuelan cuisine

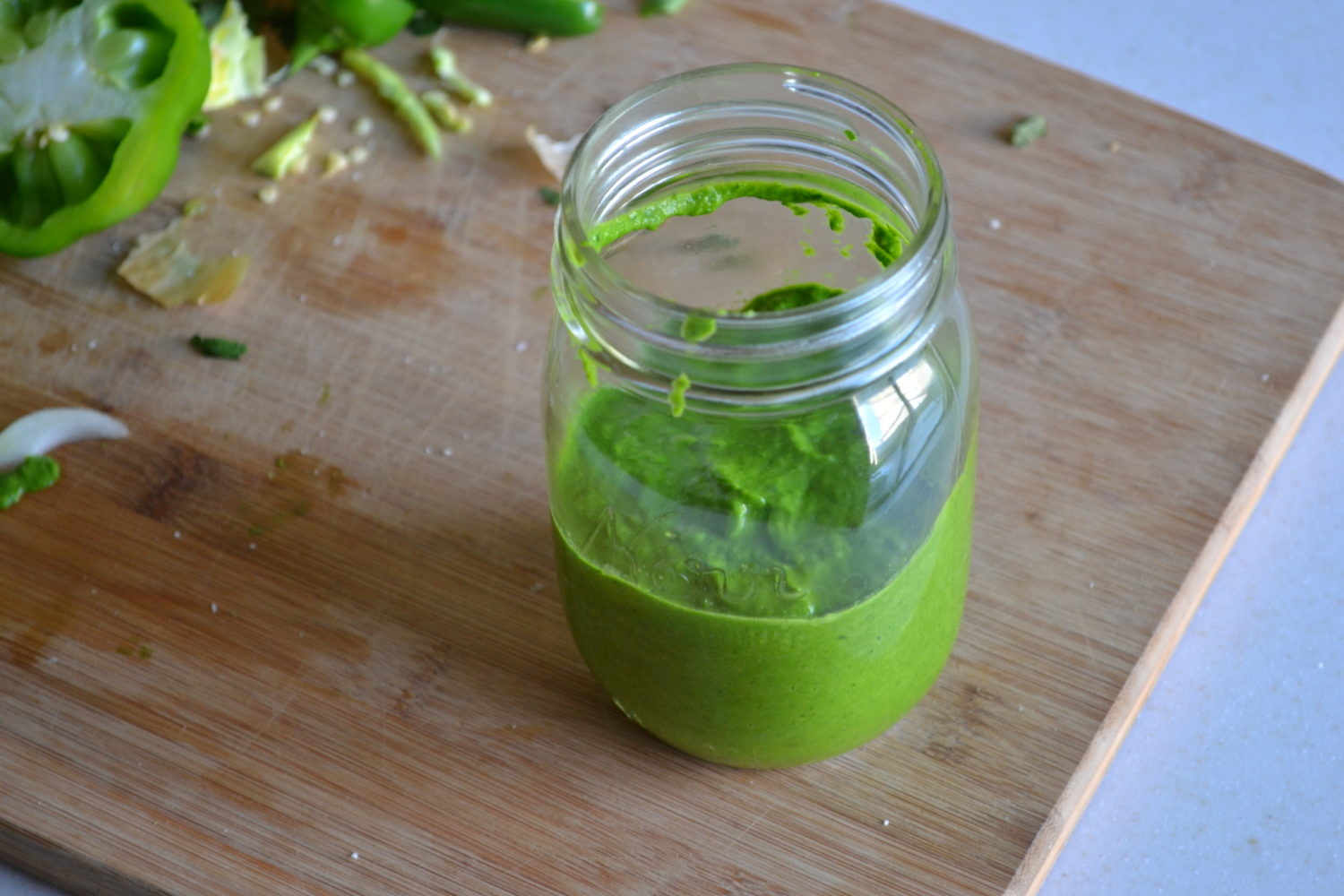
- Type: Condiment
- Place of origin: Venezuela
- Main ingredients: Variations may include cilantro, parsley, olive oil, lime or orange juice, vinegar, salt, garlic, and chili peppers
- Ingredients generally used: Avocado, pepper, onions, Worcestershire sauce, and green bell peppers
- Similar dishes: Venezuelan guasacaca is similar to guacamole; Dominican guasacaca is similar to chimichurri

Guasacaca is a savory sauce found in Dominican and Venezuelan cuisine. The name is also spelled sometimes as wasakaka, pronounced the same. It is often used in chicken dishes.

== Variations ==
=== Dominican Republic ===
In the Dominican Republic the sauce is made with lime or sour orange juice, garlic, parsley, salt, pepper and olive oil. It is similar to Canary Islands mojo, which was brought to the Caribbean and is very popular in Cuba and Puerto Rico. The sauce in Dominican Republic is boiled with plenty of water until it reduces halfway. The sauce is then used for roasted chicken and boiled cassava.

=== Venezuela ===
In Venezuela the sauce is made from avocados, olive oil, salt, pepper, lime juice or vinegar, cilantro, parsley, green bell peppers, onions, Worcestershire sauce, garlic, and chili peppers. The Venezuelan sauce is similar to Mexican guacamole.

It is served over parrillas (grilled food), arepas, empanadas, and various other dishes. It is common to make the guasacaca with a little hot sauce instead of jalapeño, but like a guacamole, it is not usually served as a hot sauce itself.

== See also ==
- Chimichurri
- Green sauce
- Guacamole
- Salsa verde
