= Austin Leslie =

Chef from New Orleans, Louisiana, US

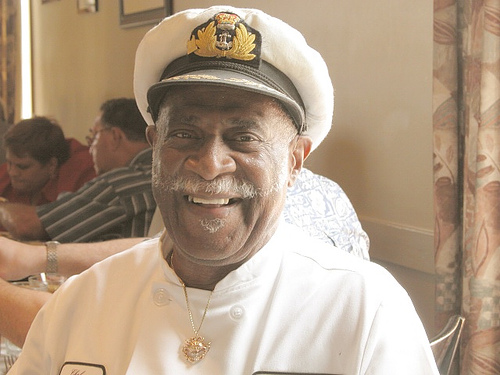
Austin Leslie at the late Pampy's Creole Kitchen in New Orleans, Louisiana, June 2005

Austin Leslie (July 2, 1934 – September 29, 2005) was a chef from New Orleans, Louisiana, who specialised in Louisiana Creole cuisine.

With his trademark captain's cap, lambchop sideburns, and broad smile, he was known as the Godfather of Fried Chicken. His distinctive style was the inspiration for the restaurant imagery of the 1987 television show Frank's Place. He died at the age of 71 after being evacuated from New Orleans in the aftermath of Hurricane Katrina.

== Biography ==
=== Early years ===
While still in high school, Leslie worked at Portia's Fountain on Rampart Street, first as a delivery boy and later in the kitchen under Chef Bill Turner. Turner taught Leslie one of the restaurant's featured dishes, a crispy fried chicken garnished with sliced dill pickles, which later became Leslie's signature dish.

After high school he worked as a chef's assistant at the D. H. Holmes restaurant. The Holmes department store catered primarily to relatively affluent white people, and for the four and half years he worked there Leslie was not allowed to prepare orders directly for customers, doing prep work instead.

In 1964, his Aunt Helen opened Chez Helene and Leslie went to work full-time as the chef.

=== Chez Helene ===
The original location of the restaurant was on North Robertson Street, near the French Quarter. It became regarded as an "underground" restaurant, with good food at reasonable prices in an off-the-beaten-path location. Despite the modest surroundings, it was compared favorably to the grand New Orleans restaurants such as Brennan's, Antoine's, and Commander's Palace. In addition to receiving rave reviews from the local food critics, Chez Helene also caught the attention of national food writers such as R.W. "Johnny" Apple of The New York Times and Calvin Trillin.

The restaurant served haute creole dishes like Oysters Rockefeller as well as down-home items like stuffed bell pepper, smothered cabbage with pig tails, fried chicken livers, and mustard greens. His aunt retired in 1975 and sold the restaurant to Leslie.

Despite its commercial and culinary success, the North Robertson neighborhood became unsafe. Cab drivers would not travel to the area, and hotel concierges would no longer recommend the restaurant. Leslie moved his business to the French Quarter and opened a branch in Chicago. He also tried his hand at running a number of fried chicken outlets. But the new location did not have the same charm as the original and Leslie eventually closed Chez Helene in 1995 after thirty years of operation. After closing the Chez Helene he wrote and published the cookbook Creole-Soul.

=== Creole in California ===
In 1992, Chef Austin combined with Oakland, California-based New Orleans Bill Creole Potato Salads/Food wholesale co. to manufacture and distribute Austin's legendary Creole cooking to New Orleans Bill's supermarket customer base all over California. Austin and "New Orleans Bill", a native New Orleanian himself, started by doing Festivals and Supermarket cooking demonstrations all over California.

=== Denmark and back to New Orleans ===
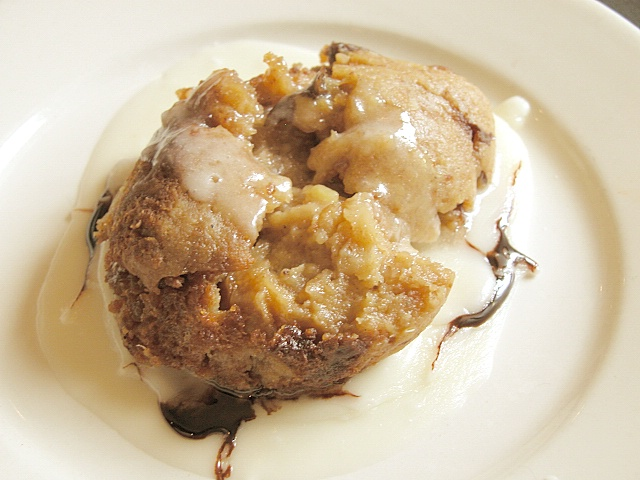
Austin Leslie's Creole bread pudding with vanilla whiskey sauce, from the late Pampy's Restaurant in New Orleans, Louisiana

After Chez Helene, Leslie worked for six months in Denmark as the executive chef of "N'Awlins". He appeared on Danish television and prepared gumbo and jambalaya for the Copenhagen Jazz Festival. After he returned to New Orleans, Leslie met Jacques Leonardi and joined on as the fry-cook of the newly opened Jacques-Imo's restaurant in the Carrollton neighborhood of New Orleans. He introduced his signature Fried Chicken with Persillade garnished with a dill pickle to a new generation of eaters.

In October 2004, he left Jacques-Imo's and joined Stan "Pampy" Barre at Pampy's Creole Kitchen in the Seventh Ward. When asked why he left, Leslie said, "I didn't move away from Jack because of money. I moved away from Jacques-Imo's because I wanted to get away from frying. I'm going to die. But I'm not going to die over that fryer." At Pampy's he worked as both a mentor to the kitchen staff, sharing his formidable knowledge of Creole cooking, and as a good-will ambassador in the front of the house, greeting and chatting with guests.

=== Death ===
In the aftermath of Hurricane Katrina, Leslie fled to the attic of his house to escape rising flood waters. He was rescued from his rooftop after two days and evacuated to a succession of sites, finally being admitted to an Atlanta hospital on September 28, 2005, with a high fever and died the next day from a heart attack. He was memorialized with a jazz funeral performed by the Hot 8 Brass Band, which marched between significant sites in Leslie's career.

== Personal life ==
Leslie was Catholic.

== Quotes ==
- "You couldn't fry a chicken better than Austin. You couldn't stuff a pepper better than Austin Leslie." - Leah Chase
- "You think you lose big when you lose your house, but here we lose a person, a person that could help us uplift everything." - Leah Chase
- [Austin Leslie's fried chicken] "tasted as if it were "made from chickens that have spent their entire pampered lives strolling around the barnyard pecking contentedly at huge cloves of garlic." - Calvin Trillin
- "He was considered by many to be the black analogue to Paul Prudhomme." - John T. Edge

== See also ==
- Soul food
