= Mojo (sauce) =

Several types of sauces

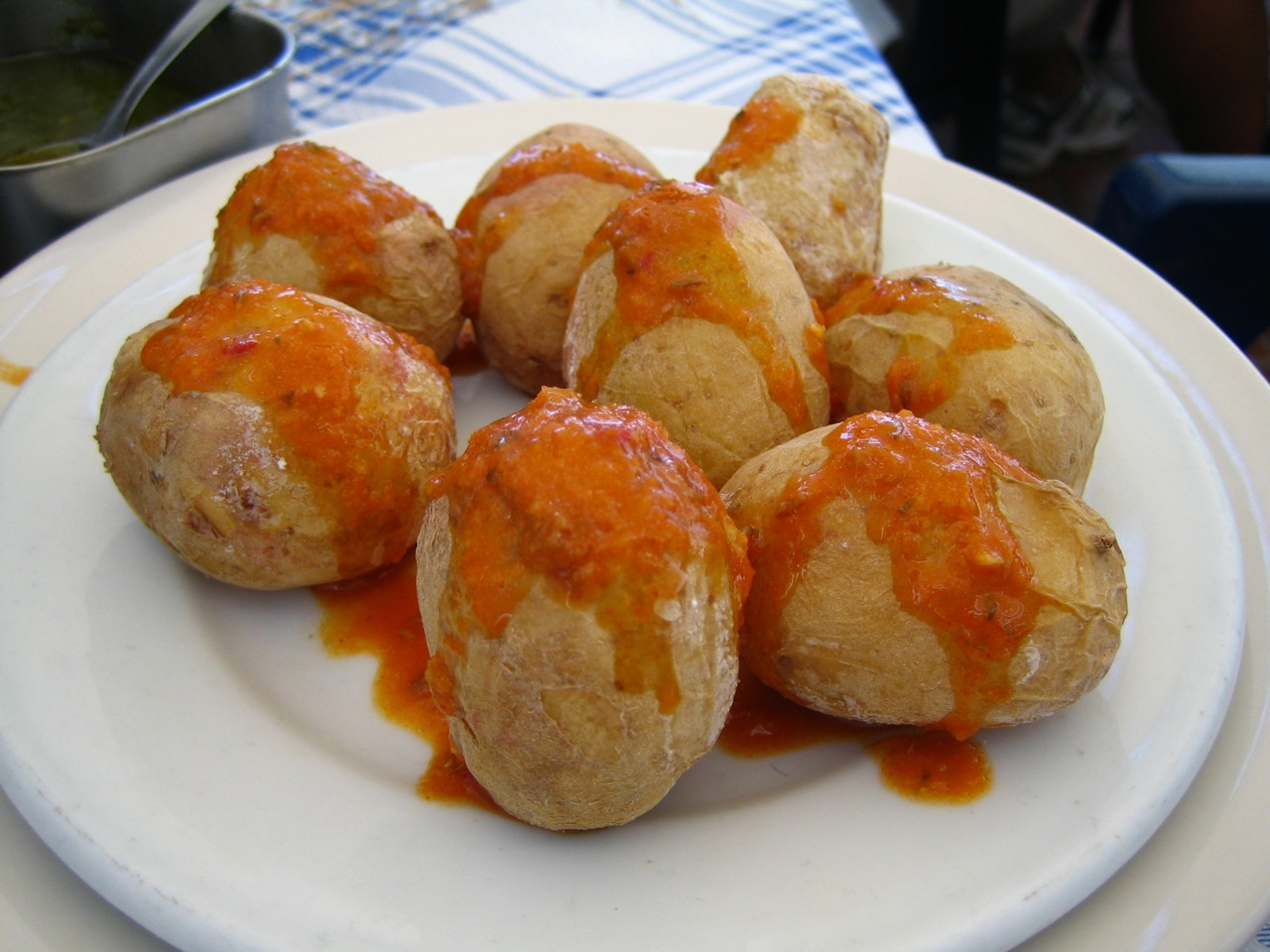
Mojo sauce spread over Canarian wrinkly potatoes

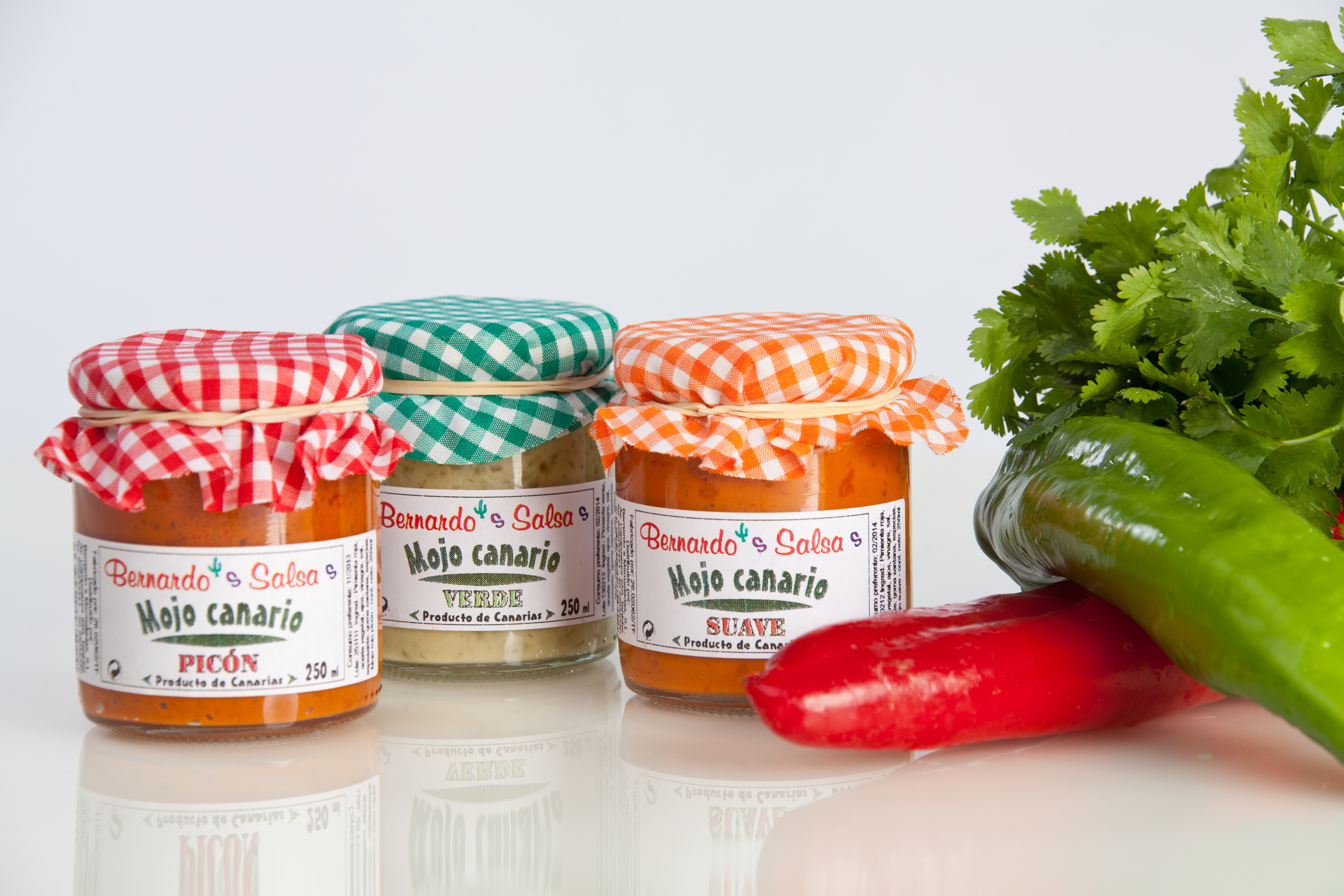
Mojo Canario

Mojo (Spanish pronunciation: [ˈmoxo], from Portuguese molho [ˈmoʎu], meaning 'sauce') is the name, or abbreviated name, of several types of sauces, varying in spiciness, consisting primarily of olive oil, local pepper varieties (called pimienta in Spain), garlic, paprika (called pimentón in Spain), cumin or coriander, and other spices. Mojo originated in the Canary Islands, where the main varieties are green mojo (mojo verde), red mojo (mojo rojo), and spicy red mojo (mojo picón). Other countries have recipes similar to mojo, where acidic ingredients such as vinegar, lemon, orange, or lime juice may be used.

== Canarian mojo ==
Green mojo, or mojo containing green spices, is commonly used for fish, especially the proper green mojo (made with green pepper) but also coriander mojo (mojo de cilantro) and parsley mojo (mojo de perejil). As coriander mojo and parsley mojo contain some water, they need to be kept in the refrigerator and have to be consumed within two days after preparation.

Red mojo, made of small red peppers from La Palma (called pimienta picona or pimienta palmera) and paprika, is usually eaten with meat. Red and green mojo can be used interchangeably to season some dishes, prominently papas arrugadas con salsa mojo, or potatoes with mojo. Mojo is also commonly served with fresh bread rolls at the beginning of a meal.

== International variations ==
Similar sauces, also known as mojo, are also popular in Cuba throughout the islands of the Caribbean, Hispanic or non-Hispanic, due to heavy Canarian emigration to the Caribbean, as well as Mexico.

In Cuban cooking, mojo applies to any sauce made with garlic, olive oil, or pork lard, and a citrus juice, traditionally bitter orange juice. It is commonly used to marinate roast pork or as a dip for plantain chips and fried cassava (yuca frita). The sauce is occasionally called by its diminutive, 'mojito', but should not be confused with the cocktail of the same name.

In Puerto Rico, mojo is a herb sauce of finely chopped cilantro or parsley with salt, plenty of crushed garlic, and olive oil. Black pepper, butter, grated onion, vinegar, and any citrus fruit can also be added. It is commonly used on the island as a marinade for chicken roast and a dip for tostones, fried cassava, and sometimes mashed with mofongo. There is also a version popular in the town of Salinas, called mojito isleño, which is served with seafood, particularly fish.

In the Dominican Republic, a similar sauce called wasakaka is used as a sauce for roasted chicken and boiled cassava. Wasakaka is made of boiling plenty of water with parsley, garlic, olive oil, and sour orange or lime juice.

== See also ==
- Aioli
- Garlic sauce
- Green sauce
- List of sauces
