= Green sauce =

Sauce made from chopped herbs

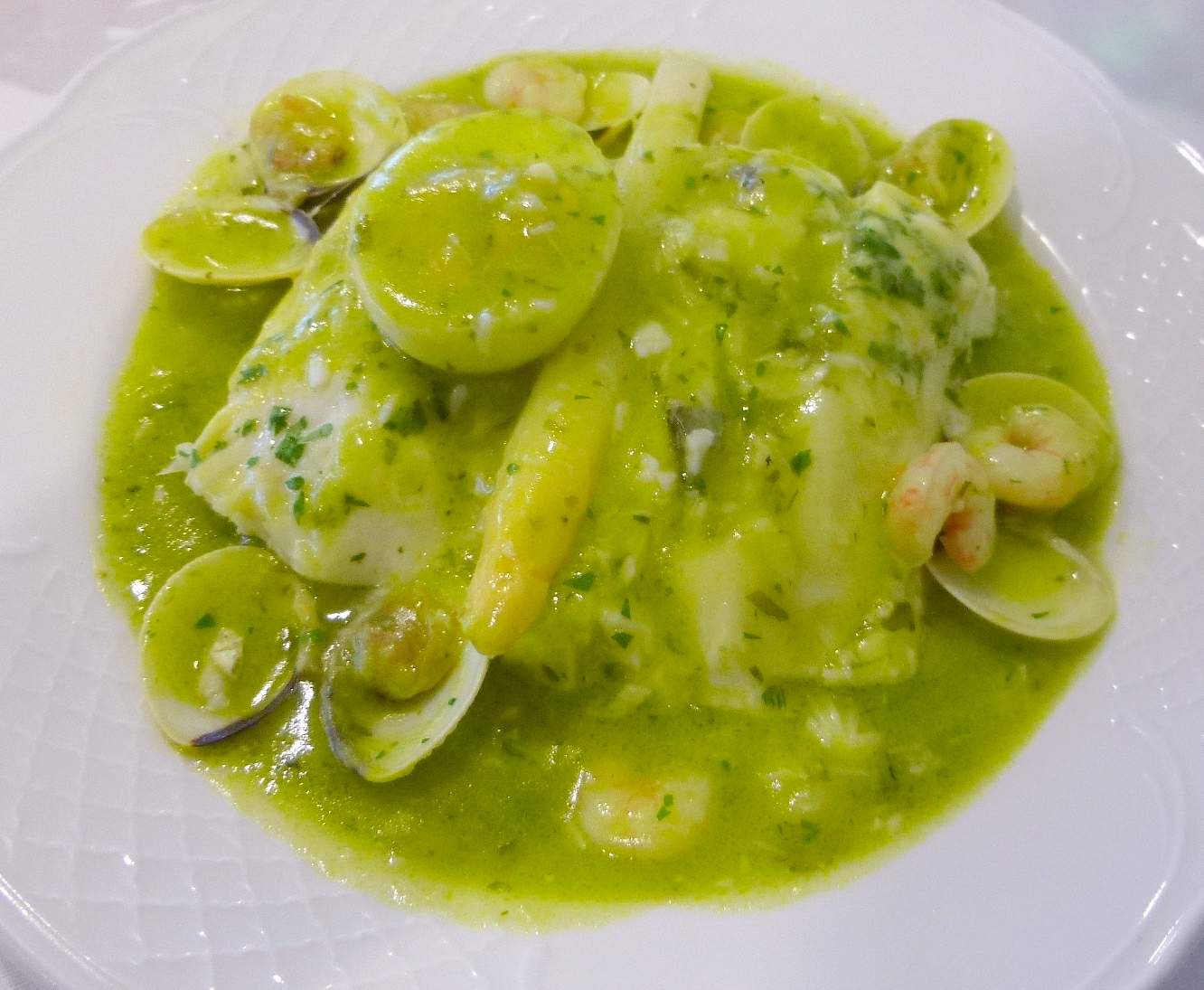
Spanish salsa verde used with hake and clams

Green sauce or greensauce is a family of cold, uncooked sauces based on chopped herbs, including the Spanish and Italian salsa verde, the French sauce verte, the German grüne Soße or Frankfurter grie Soß (Frankfurt dialect), the British mint sauce and greensauce, and the Argentine chimichurri.

The Mexican salsa verde, though also called a "green sauce", is instead based on tomatillos and is commonly cooked; the New Mexico version uses a green chile base.

== History ==
Green sauce has a long history in many parts of Europe. It was certainly present in the Middle Ages, and may date to the Classical period.

Green sauce made with parsley and often sage was one of the most common sauces of medieval cookery. In a 14th-century recipe, green sauce served with a dish of cheese and whole egg yolks boiled in watered down wine with herbs and spices was recommended for "lords, for settling their temperament and whetting their appetite".

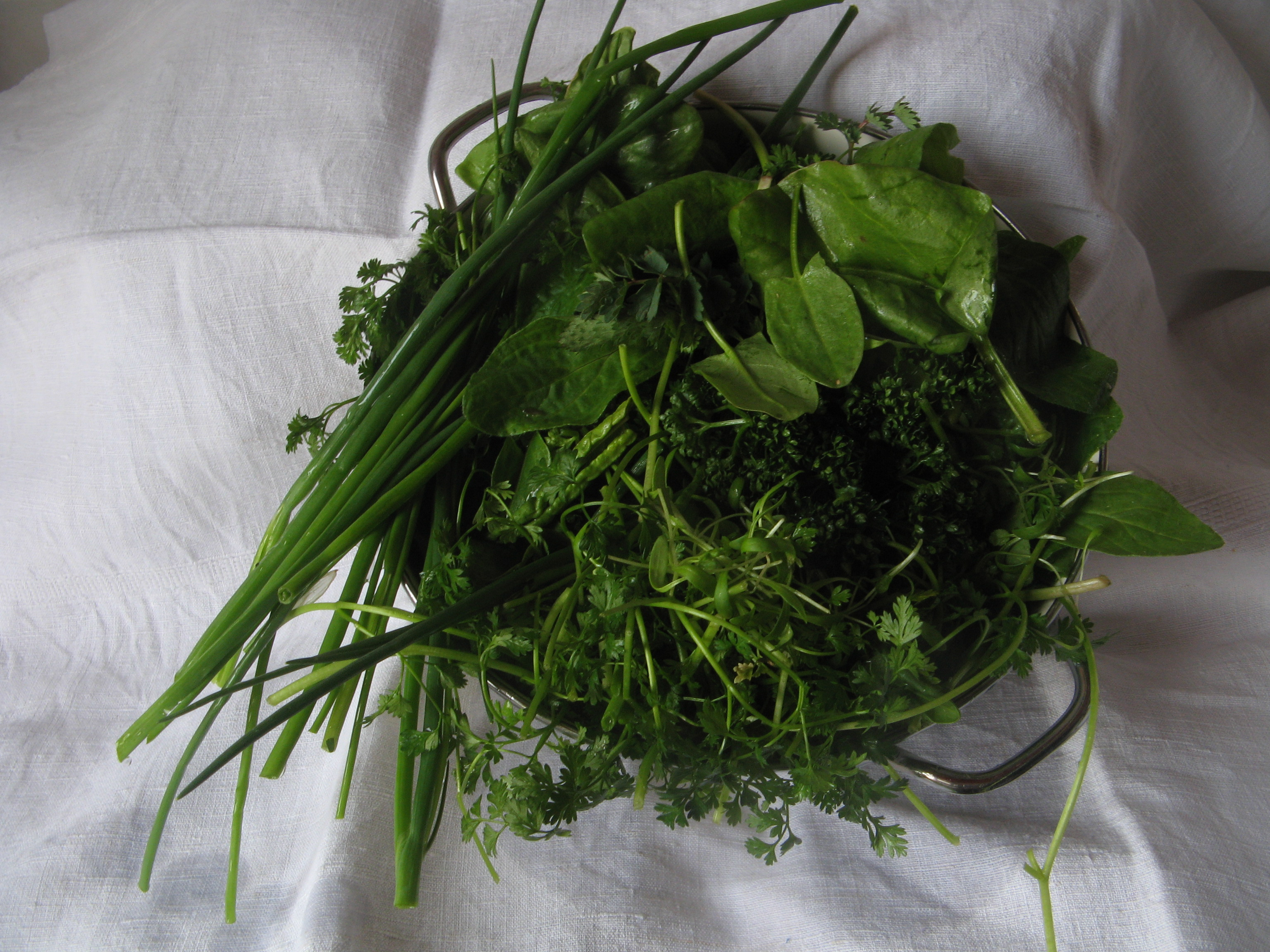
Some possible herbal ingredients of green sauce

The basic recipe is probably from the Near East and, as such, is probably at least 2,000 years old. Roman legionaries brought it to Italy, from where it was exported to France and Germany. Evidence suggests that it was introduced in Frankfurt by the Italian trading families Bolongaro and Crevenna around 1700.

A possible origin of the German variant is French Protestant immigrants to Kurhessen in the 18th century. The German variant uses a different mix of herbs, since Mediterranean herbs were not available in Germany at the time.

== Ancient Rome ==
The Apicius (5th century CE) mentions a Ius viride in avibus ('Green sauce for fowl') consisting of pepper, caraway, spikenard, cumin, bay leaves, a variety of green herbs, dates, honey, vinegar, wine, broth, and oil.

== Spain ==
In Spain, salsa verde usually refers to a fish sauce. The sauce is prepared using a base made of garlic and onion sofrito. A flour-coated piece of fish (typically hake, clams) is added to it. Once the flour coating has cooked, white wine and fish fumet is added, letting the fish be boiled. As the fish is cooked through, the sauce thickens. In the final steps, parsley is added, giving the sauce its characteristic green colour. Merluza en salsa verde (hake in green sauce) is perhaps the most typical dish prepared in this way. Depending on the fish and on the region, other green herbs may be employed as well, including spinach, fresh savory, watercress, or tarragon.

== Italy ==
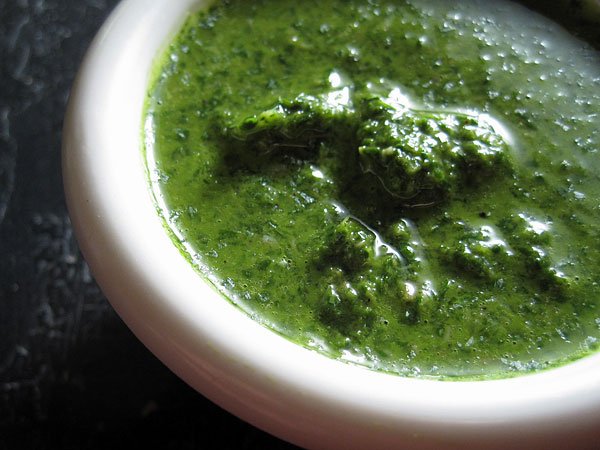
Italian salsa verde

The Italian salsa verde is a cold rustic sauce, and includes parsley, vinegar, capers, garlic, onion, anchovies, olive oil, hard-boiled egg yolks, and possibly mustard. The ingredients are coarsely chopped, formerly by hand, now often in a food processor. In some regions, cubed bread is soaked in vinegar and blended with the other ingredients, which creates an emulsion somewhat similar to a vinaigrette. In other regions, there is no bread.

Salsa verde is used as a condiment or dipping sauce for meats, fish, poultry, or vegetables. Salsa verde, known in Piedmont and Lombardy as bagnetto verde, is served with bollito misto in a "classic meat dish", served in many city and country restaurants. The salted lake sardines from the Lake Como, called misoltini, are warmed or grilled and served with salsa verde. It is also served with other grilled or stewed fish. A salsa verde with garlic, called agliata, is a traditional specialty of the Siena region on the feast day of Saint John.

Gremolata is a green sauce in Milanese cuisine based on parsley, lemon peel, and garlic, and is the usual accompaniment for ossobuco.

== France ==
The French persillade is a simple sauce, based on chopped parsley and garlic, and possibly shallots, olive oil, vinegar and/or breadcrumbs. Another recipe, named sauce verte au pain, was already known in the Renaissance, and was originally a bread sauce very similar to the Italian; today the sauce verte is usually mayonnaise flavoured with tarragon, and sometimes parsley, sage and lemon juice or vinegar.

== Germany ==
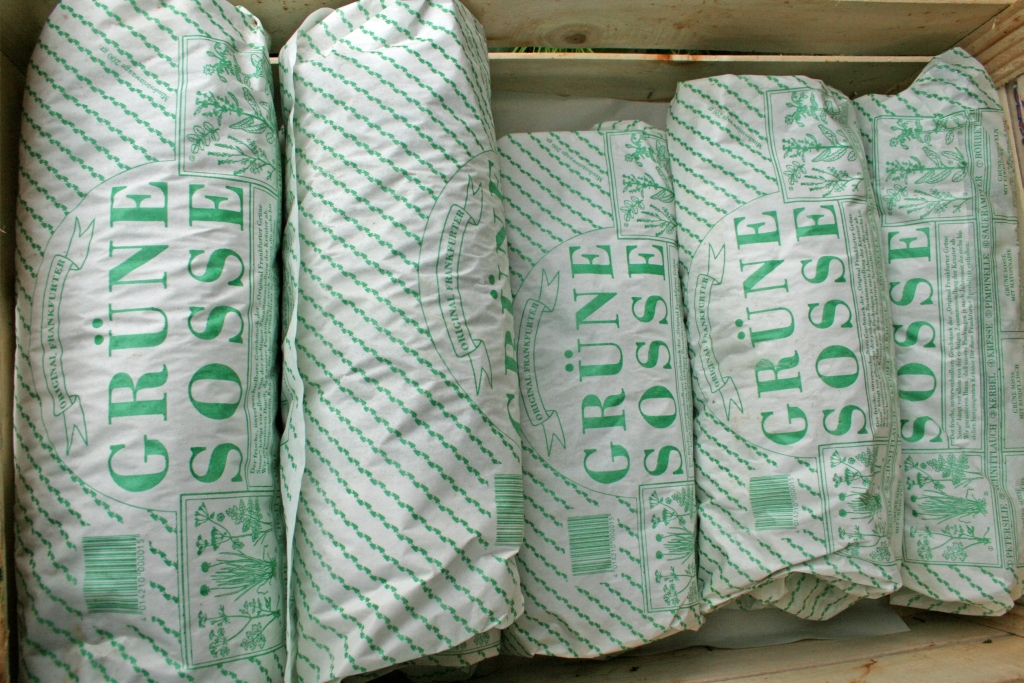
Packages of herbs for "Frankfurter Grüne Soße" sold on regional markets

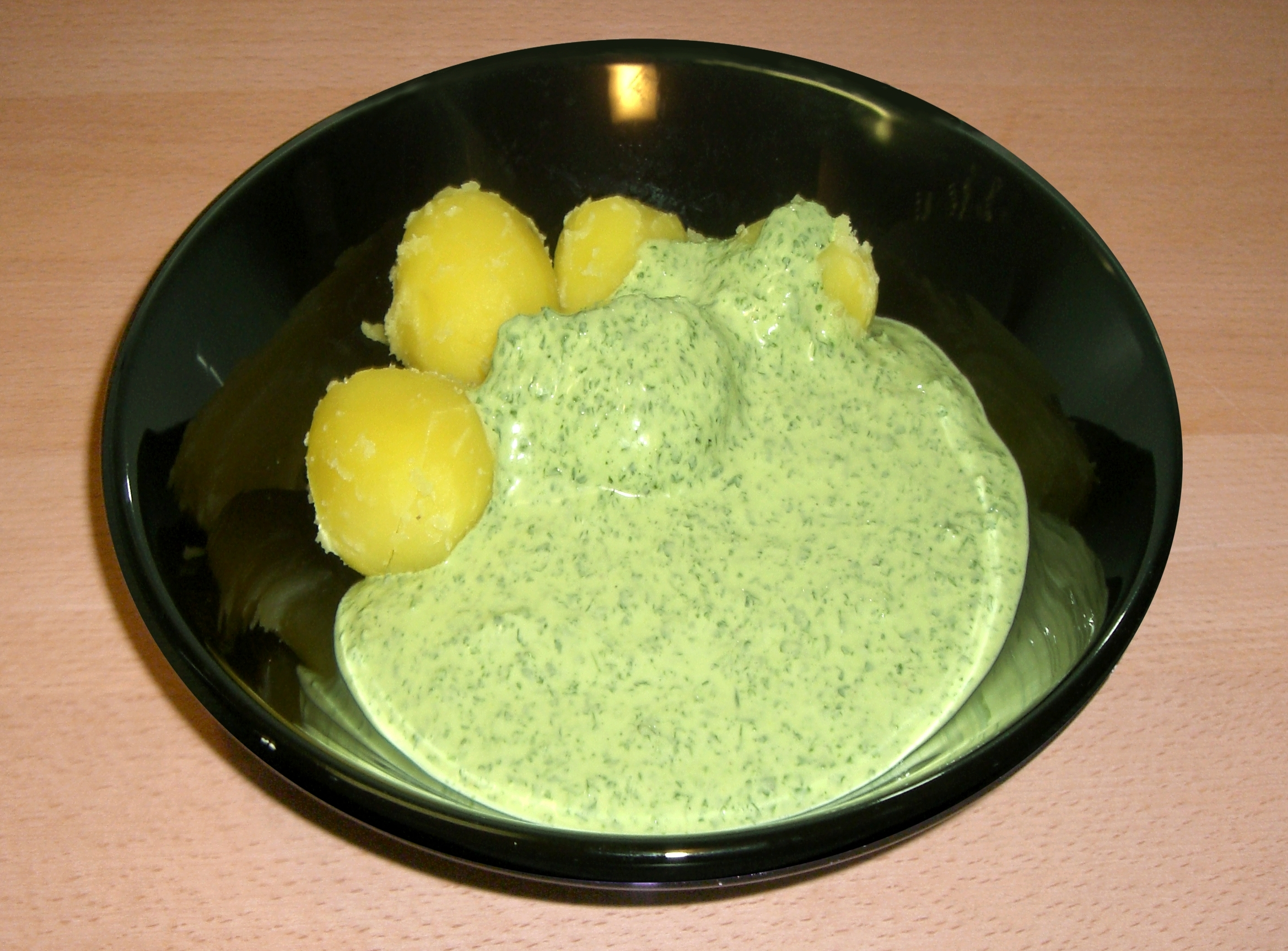
"Frankfurter Grüne Soße" with potatoes

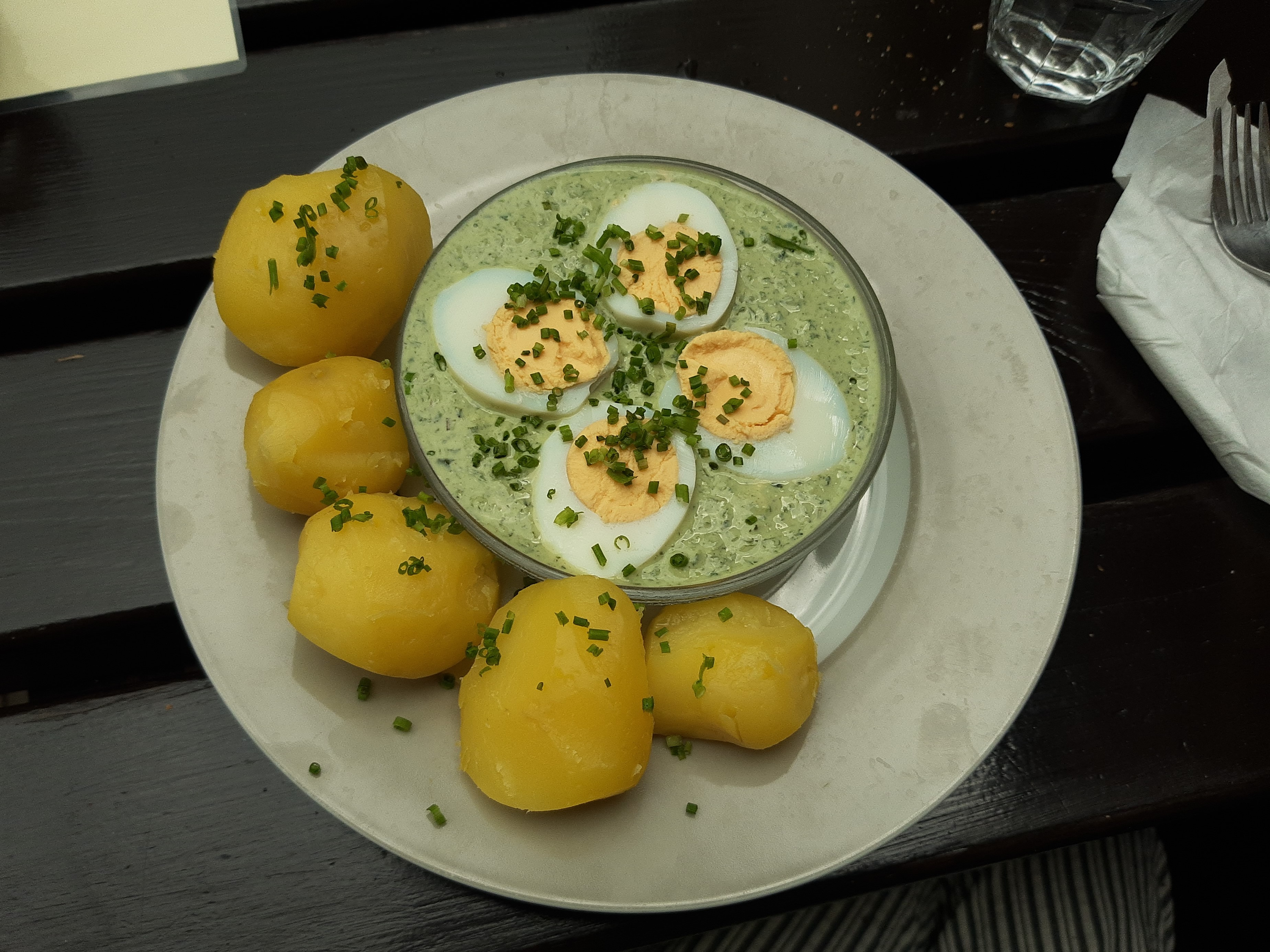
Hard boiled eggs in Grüne Soße with potatoes

Grüne Soße is a specialty of the German state of Hesse. Centres of popularity are the cities of Frankfurt am Main (where it is sometimes called Grie Soß) and Kassel, which lay claim to its origins. The Frankfurt-style is made exclusively from seven fresh herbs, namely parsley, chives, chervil, borage, sorrel, garden cress, and salad burnet together with sour cream, oil, vinegar, mustard, salt and added hard boiled eggs. Variants of other local areas, often varying by season, include dill, shallots, lovage, lemon balm, and even spinach. In more frugal times, daisy leaves, broad plantain leaves, and dandelion leaves have been used.

The hard-boiled eggs are sieved or pureed before being mixed with sour cream to form the creamy base of the sauce. The fresh chopped herbs are then added. Some variations use buttermilk, quark, or yogurt instead of sour cream. In the city of Kassel, a combination of sour cream and schmand is used.

The sauce is served cold with peeled boiled potatoes or just with rye bread, as an accompaniment to either hard-boiled eggs or roast beef brisket. It may also be served with cooked fish or roast beef, or as a side dish to barbecue. A local schnitzel specialty, called Frankfurter Schnitzel, is always served with green sauce, along with apple cider (Apfelwein) as a traditional accompanying drink. Green sauce was supposedly Goethe's favourite condiment; a legend that his mother invented it is likely apocryphal.

The local importance of the dish is shown by the abundance of green sauce at local markets and by the Green Sauce Monument installed in Frankfurt-Oberrad in 2007. The latter consists of seven small greenhouses with the main herbal ingredients and was part of the Luminale, a local art and light event. The protected geographical indication (PGI) was awarded to the fresh herb composition by the European Union on 9 March 2016; publication of the detailed application with the product specification dated October 2015.

In many Hessian families, Green Sauce is part of the traditional meal eaten on Maundy Thursday, relating to its German name Gründonnerstag (lit. 'Green Thursday').

== Britain ==
British greensauce is made of herbs, especially sorrel, mixed with vinegar and sugar. It is eaten with meat. It is first documented in the 12th century in the writings of Alexander Neckham. His recipe includes sage, parsley, dittany, thyme, garlic, salt, pepper, and a spice which is little-known nowadays, costus. Sorrel was so heavily used in greensauce that sorrel itself was sometimes called "greensauce".

== Argentina ==
Chimichurri is a green sauce used in Argentina and other parts of Latin America, usually served on grilled meat.

== See also ==
- Pesto
- Green goddess dressing – a salad dressing of green sauce with sour cream and mayonnaise
