= Pesto =

Italian food paste

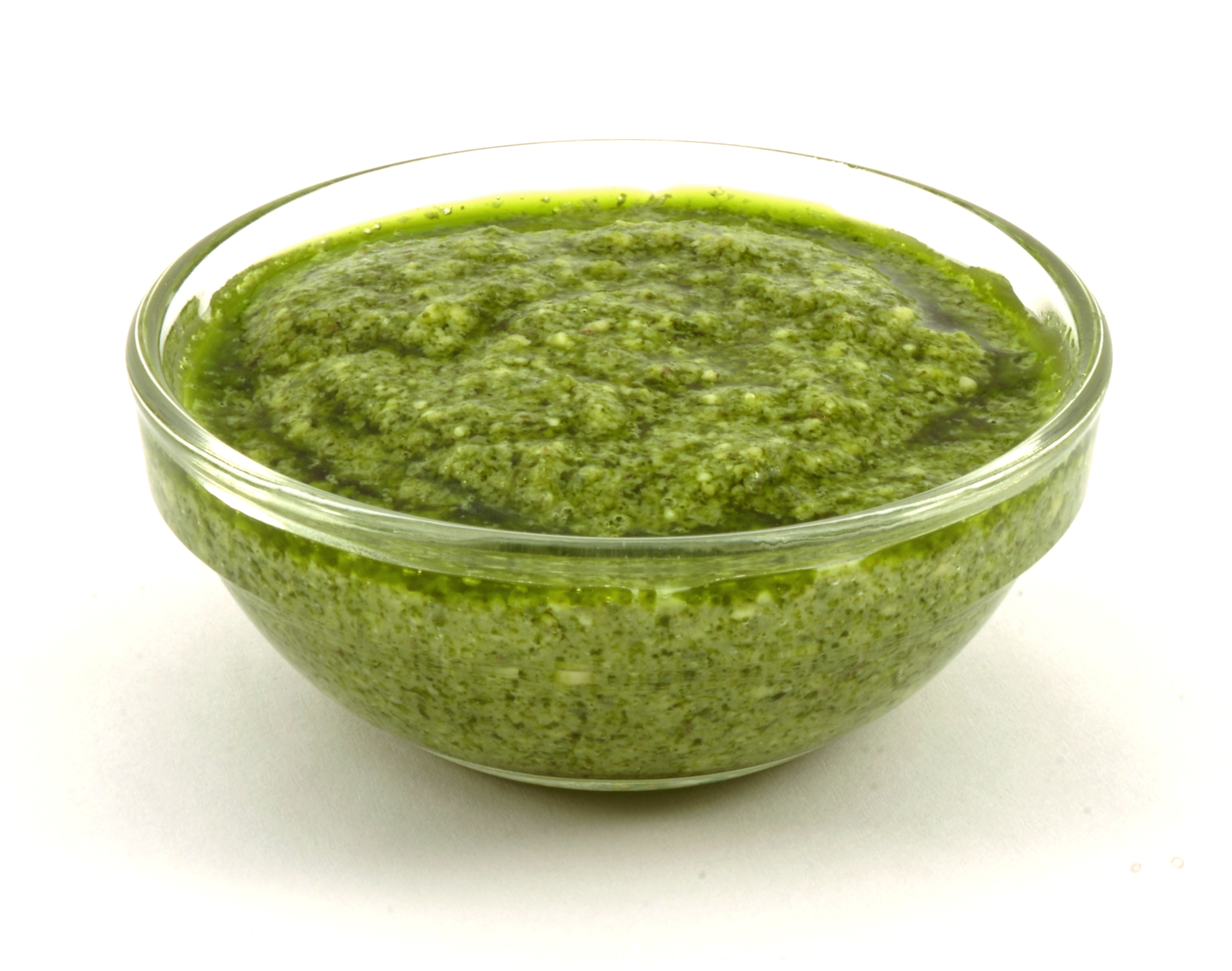
- Alternative names: Pesto genovese
- Type: Sauce
- Place of origin: Italy
- Region or state: Genoa, Liguria
- Main ingredients: Basil, extra virgin olive oil, Parmesan (alternatively Grana Padano), pecorino sardo, pine nuts, garlic

Pesto (Italian: [ˈpesto]), also known as pesto genovese, is an Italian paste traditionally made with leaves of Genovese basil, extra virgin olive oil, Parmesan (alternatively Grana Padano), pecorino sardo, pine nuts, and garlic. It originated in the Ligurian city of Genoa and is used to dress pasta.

== Etymology ==
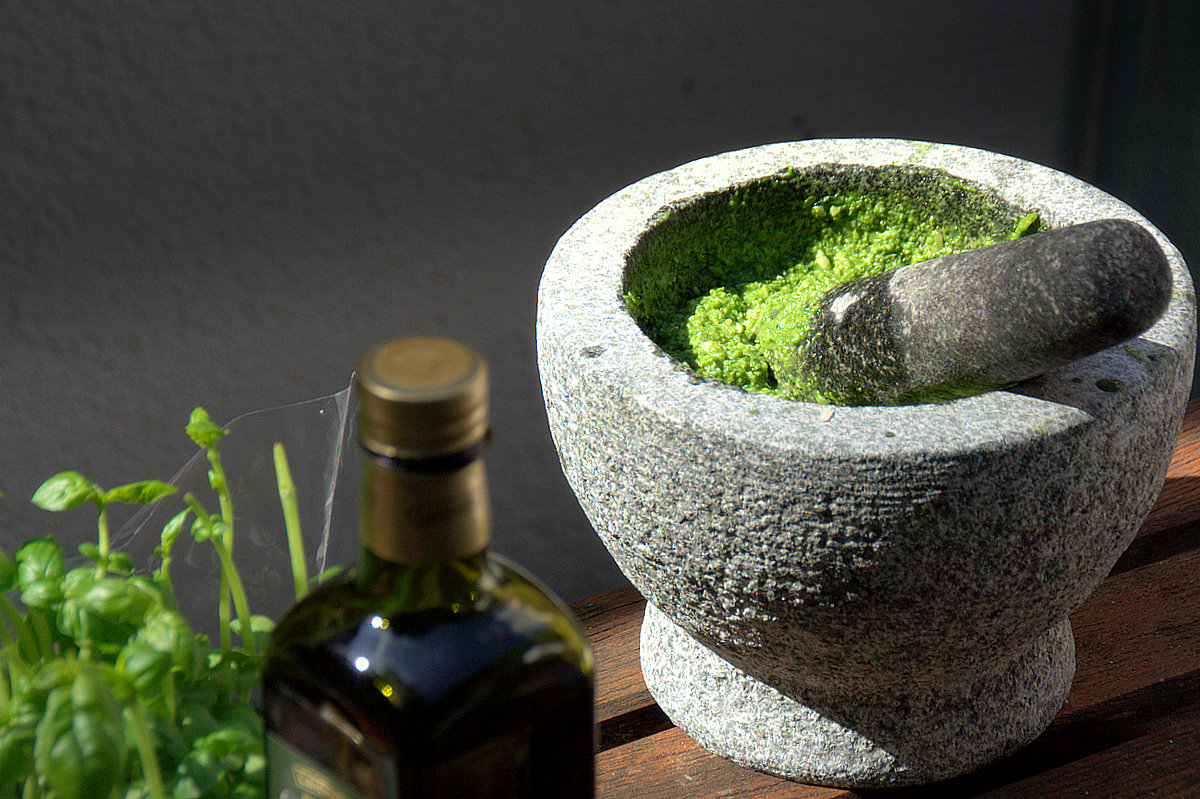
Pesto

The name pesto is the past participle of the Genoese verb pestâ (Italian: pestare), meaning 'to pound', 'to crush': the ingredients are "crushed" or ground in a marble mortar through a circular motion of a wooden pestle. The same Latin root is the basis for pestle. There are other foods called "pesto", but pesto by itself usually means pesto alla genovese.

== History ==
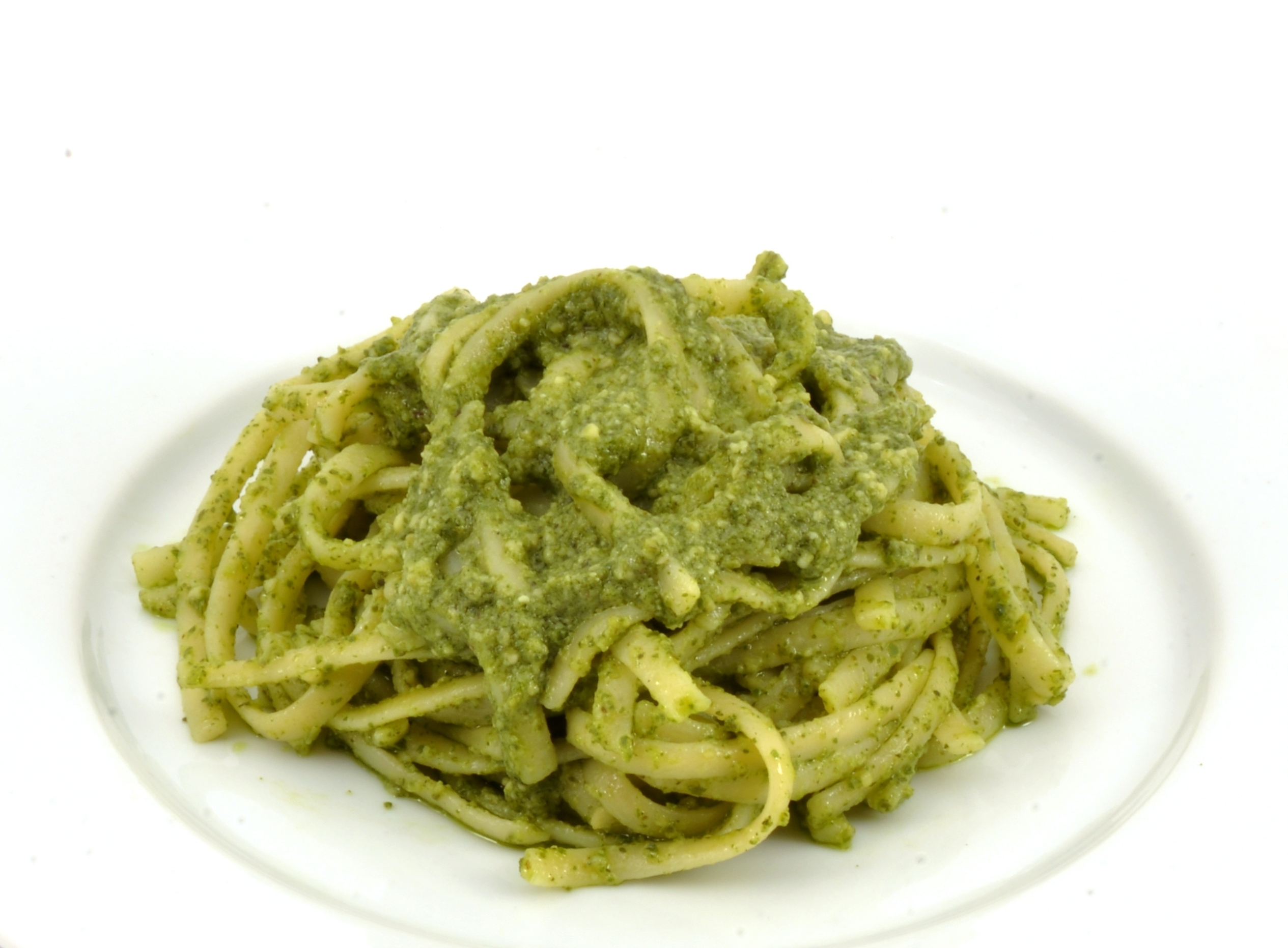
Trenette with pesto

Pesto is thought to have had two predecessors in ancient times, going back as far as the Roman age. The ancient Romans used to eat a similar paste called moretum, which was made by crushing garlic, salt, cheese, herbs, olive oil, and vinegar (and sometimes pine nuts) together. The use of this paste in the Roman cuisine is mentioned in the Appendix Vergiliana, an ancient collection of poems in which the author details the preparation of moretum. During the Middle Ages, a popular sauce in the Genoan cuisine was agliata, which was a mash of garlic and walnuts, as garlic was a staple in the nutrition of Ligurians, especially for the seafarers.

The introduction of basil, the main ingredient of modern pesto, occurred in more recent times and is first documented only from the 1850s. Emanuele Rossi published La Vera Cucineria Genovese in 1852 and gastronomist Giovanni Battista Ratto published La Cuciniera Genovese in 1863:

Take a clove of garlic, basil or, when that is lacking, marjoram and parsley, grated Dutch and Parmigiano cheese and mix them with pine nuts and crush it all together in a mortar with a little butter until reduced to a paste. Then dissolve it with good and abundant oil. Lasagne and trofie are dressed with this mash, made more liquid by adding a little hot water without salt.

Basil took the firmest root in the regions of Liguria, Italy, and Provence, France. It is abundant in these regions in season, and marjoram and parsley may be used when basil is out of season. Ratto mentions Dutch cheese (formaggio olandese) instead of pecorino sardo (Sardinian sheep's cheese), since Northern European cheeses were common in Genoa at the time, thanks to the centuries-long commercial trades of the maritime republic.

This recipe for pesto alla genovese was often revised in the following years (a noted revision by Emanuele Rossi occurred in 1865, only a couple of years after Ratto's Cuciniera), and it shortly became a staple in the Ligurian culinary tradition, with many variants.

An early American pesto recipe was published in 1928; it includes butter and cream. In 1946, Sunset magazine published a pesto recipe by Angelo Pellegrini. Pesto became popular in North America in the 1980s and 1990s.

== Ingredients and preparation ==
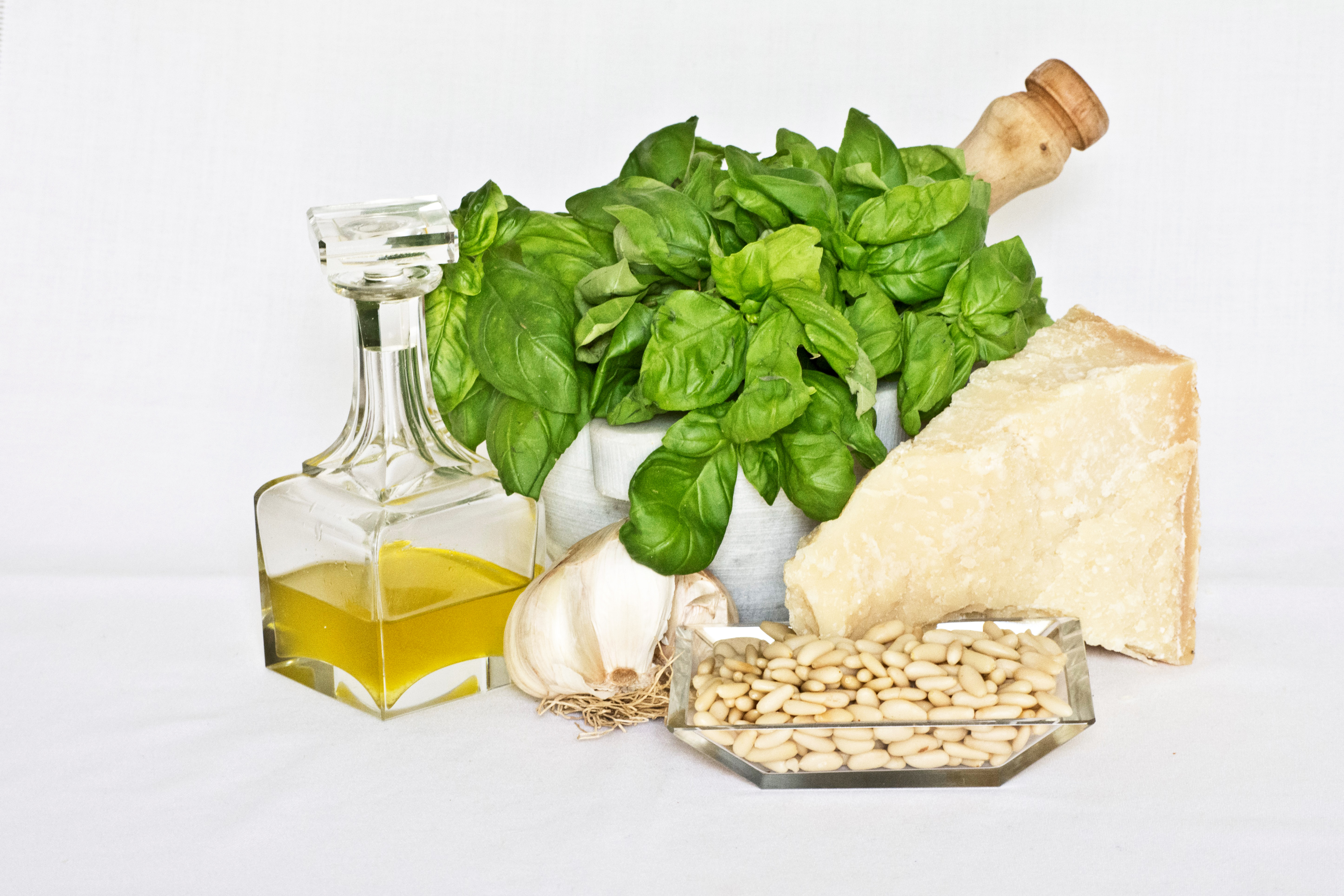
Ingredients for pesto alla genovese

Pesto is traditionally prepared in a marble mortar with a wooden pestle. First, garlic and pine nuts are placed in the mortar and reduced to a cream, and then the washed and dried basil leaves are added with coarse salt and ground to a creamy consistency. Only then is a mix of Parmesan and pecorino added. To help incorporate the cheese, a little extra-virgin olive oil is added. In a tight jar (or simply in an air-tight plastic container), covered by a layer of extra-virgin olive oil, pesto can last in the refrigerator for up to a week and can be frozen for later use.

=== Varieties ===
Pesto comes in a variety of recipes, some traditional and some modern, as the very noun pesto is a generic term for anything that is made by pounding.

The original pesto alla genovese is made with Genovese basil, coarse salt, garlic, Ligurian extra virgin olive oil (Taggiasco), European pine nuts (sometimes toasted), and a grated cheese such as Parmesan or Grana Padano and pecorino sardo or pecorino romano. A proposal is under preparation by the Palatifini Association to have pesto alla genovese included in the UNESCO intangible cultural heritage list.

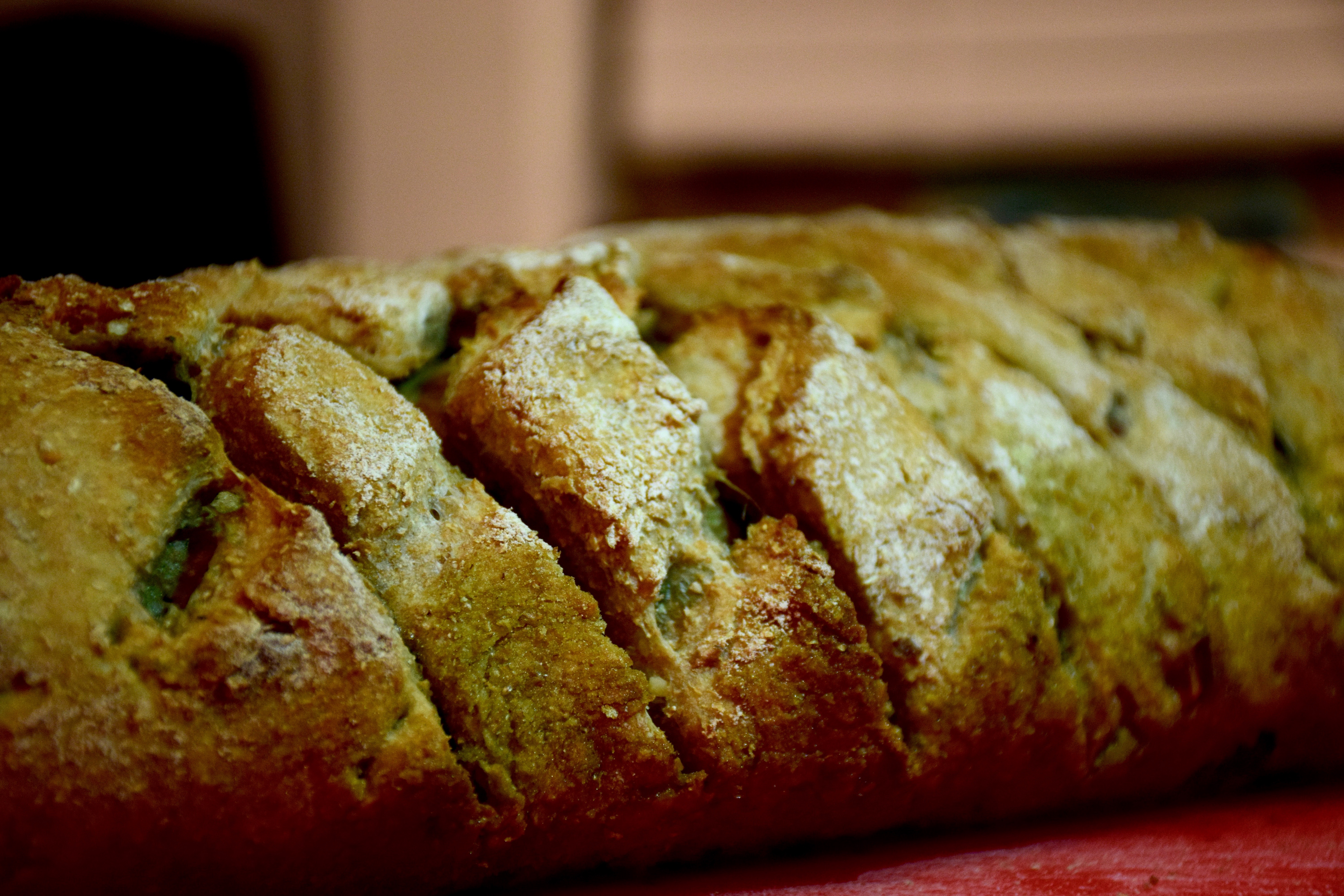
Freshly baked pesto bread

There is a slightly different version in Provence, where it is known as pistou (from pistar, 'to pound' in Occitan). Pistou is generally made with only olive oil, basil, and garlic, and not cheese, although some modern versions include it. Almonds or breadcrumbs can be used to give the final consistency. Pistou is used in the soupe au pistou, a hearty vegetable soup.

Outside of Italy, sometimes almond, Brazil nuts, cashew, hazelnut, macadamia, pecan, pistachio, walnut or even peanuts are used instead of pine nuts, and sometimes coriander, dill, kale, mint, parsley, rocket, spinach or wild garlic leaves are mixed in with the basil leaves. Any combination of flavourful leaves, oily nuts, hard cheese, olive oil, garlic, salt, and lemon juice can produce a pesto-like condiment.

Pesto alla siciliana, also known as pesto alla trapanese and sometimes called pesto rosso ('red pesto'), is a sauce from Sicily similar to pesto alla genovese but with the addition of fresh tomato and almonds instead of pine nuts, and much less basil.

Pesto alla calabrese is a sauce from Calabria consisting of (grilled) bell peppers, black pepper, and more; these ingredients give it a distinctively spicy taste.

Outside Italy, the name "pesto" has been used for all sorts of cold sauces or dips, mostly without any of the original ingredients: coriander, dill, kale, mint, parsley, rocket, spinach or wild garlic (instead of or in addition to basil), artichokes, black olives, green olives, lemon peel, lime peel or mushrooms. In more northern countries, ramson leaves are sometimes used instead of basil.

Vegan variations may substitute miso paste and nutritional yeast for cheese.

== Non-traditional variants of pesto ==
For reasons of expense or availability, almond, Brazil nut, cashew, hazelnut, macadamia, pecan, pistachio, walnut or even peanuts are sometimes substituted for the traditional pine nuts. Also, while the nuts are traditionally raw, some recipes call for prior toasting or roasting. Other nuts may be used due to the taste disturbances that some people may experience after consuming pine nuts (see pine mouth). Many online recipes in English for pesto include black pepper or white pepper, which are not present in the usual Genovese recipe. Prepared pesto sold in supermarkets often replaces the extra virgin olive oil with cheaper vegetable oils. Some manufacturers of pesto for European supermarkets also use fillers such as potato flakes or potato starch, which soften the strong flavour. Certain pesto recipes abroad replace basil or pine nuts with other herbs and greens, such as:

- Coconut
- Avocado and parsley
- Carrots, coriander, and cumin
- Turmeric
- Ginger
- Perilla leaf
- Spirulina
- Walnuts

== See also ==
Media related to Pesto at Wikimedia Commons Pesto at the Wikibooks Cookbook subproject

- Cuisine of Liguria
- Pesto alla trapanese
