= Gremolata =

Condiment for ossobuco

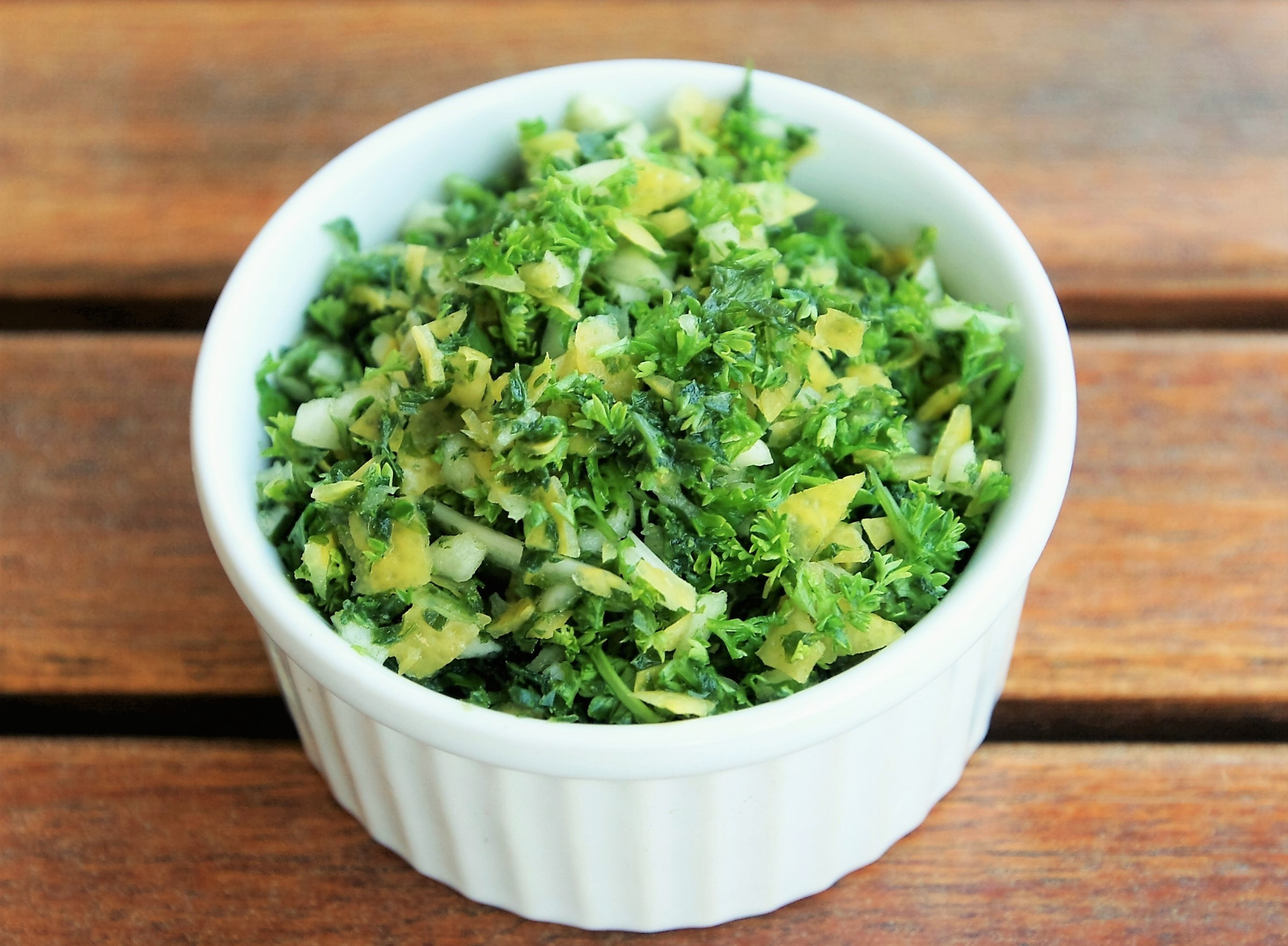
Diced gremolada ingredients (to be sprinkled as a garnish or blended into a green sauce)

Gremolata (Italian: [ɡremoˈlaːta]) or gremolada (Italian: [ɡremoˈlaːda], Lombard: [ɡremuˈlaːda]) is a green sauce made with chopped parsley, lemon zest, and garlic. It is the standard accompaniment to the Lombard braised veal shank dish ossobuco.

== Ingredients ==
Gremolata usually includes grated lemon peel, although the zest from other citrus fruits (lime, orange, grapefruit, etc.) may be used.

Variations include adding or substituting other herbs (such as cilantro/coriander, mint, and sage); leaving the herbs out (in favor of finely grated fresh horseradish and minced shallot); or adding another pungent ingredient (such as pecorino romano cheese, anchovy, toasted pinoles, and grated bottarga (dried salted fish roe)).

== See also ==
Media related to Gremolata at Wikimedia Commons

- List of sauces
