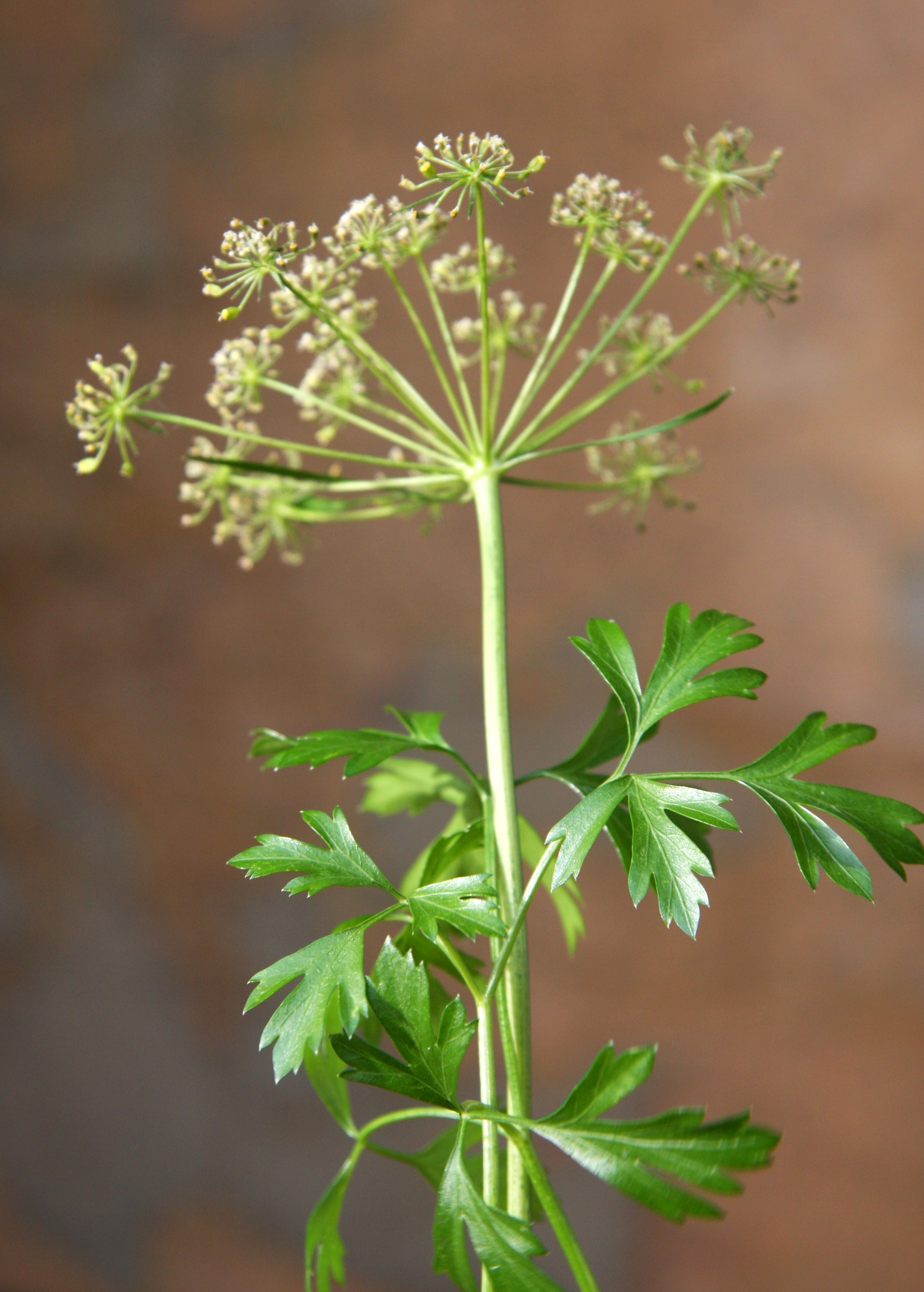
- Parsley leaves and flowers

Scientific classification
- Kingdom: Plantae
- Clade: Tracheophytes
- Clade: Angiosperms
- Clade: Eudicots
- Clade: Asterids
- Order: Apiales
- Family: Apiaceae
- Genus: Petroselinum
- Species: P. crispum

Binomial name
- Petroselinum crispum (Mill.) Fuss

Synonyms
- List: Ammi petroselinoides C.Presl ex DC.; Anisactis segetalis Dulac; Apium crispum Mill.; Apium laetum Salisb.; Apium latifolium Mill.; Apium latifolium Poir.; Apium occidentale Calest.; Apium peregrinum (L.) Crantz; Apium petroselinum L.; Apium petroselinum var. angustifolium Hayne; Apium petroselinum var. variegatum Nois.; Apium petroselinum var. vulgare Nois.; Apium romanum Zuccagni; Apium tuberosum Steud.; Apium vulgare Lam.; Bupleurum petroselinoides Spreng.; Carum peregrinum L.; Carum petroselinum (L.) Benth. & Hook.f.; Carum vulgare Druce; Cnidium petroselinum DC.; Ligusticum peregrinum L.; Petroselinum anatolicum Freyn & Sint.; Petroselinum crispum var. angustifolium (Hayne) Reduron; Petroselinum crispum f. angustifolium (Hayne) Danert; Petroselinum crispum f. breve (Alef.) Danert; Petroselinum crispum var. erfurtense Danert; Petroselinum crispum f. hispanicum (Alef.) Danert; Petroselinum crispum var. neapolitanum Danert; Petroselinum crispum var. petroselinum (L.) Reduron; Petroselinum crispum var. radicosum (Alef.) Danert; Petroselinum crispum f. tenuisectum (Danert) Danert; Petroselinum crispum subsp. tuberosum (Bernh. ex Rchb.) Soó; Petroselinum crispum f. variegatum (Nois.) Danert; Petroselinum crispum var. vulgare (Nois.) Danert; Petroselinum fractophyllum Lag. ex Sweet; Petroselinum hortense Hoffm.; Petroselinum hortense f. tenuisectum Danert; Petroselinum macedonicum Bubani; Petroselinum peregrinum (L.) Lag.; Petroselinum romanum (Zuccagni) Sweet; Petroselinum sativum Hoffm.; Petroselinum sativum Hoffm. ex Gaudin; Petroselinum sativum var. breve Alef.; Petroselinum sativum var. hispanicum Alef.; Petroselinum sativum var. longum Alef.; Petroselinum sativum convar. radicosum Alef.; Petroselinum sativum var. silvestre Alef.; Petroselinum sativum var. variegatum (Nois.) Alef.; Petroselinum sativum var. vulgare (Nois.) Alef.; Petroselinum selinoides DC.; Petroselinum thermoeri Weinm.; Petroselinum vulgare Lag.; Petroselinum vulgare Hill; Peucedanum intermedium Simonk.; Peucedanum petroselinum (L.) Desf.; Selinum petroselinum (L.) E.H.L.Krause; Siler japonicum (Thunb.) Tanaka; Sison peregrinum Spreng.; Sium oppositifolium Kit. ex Schult.; Sium petroselinum Vest; Wydleria portoricensis DC.

= Parsley =

Species of flowering plant in the celery family cultivated as an herb

Parsley, or garden parsley (Petroselinum crispum), is a species of flowering plant in the family Apiaceae that is native to Greece, the Balkans, Algeria and Morocco. It has been introduced and naturalized in Europe and elsewhere in the world with suitable climates, and is widely cultivated as a herb and a vegetable.

It is believed to have been originally grown in Sardinia, and was cultivated around the 3rd century BC. Linnaeus stated its wild habitat to be Sardinia, from where it was brought to England in 1548 according to historical horticultural sources though literary evidence suggests parsley was used in England in the Middle Ages as early as the Anglo-Saxon period.

Parsley is widely used in European, Middle Eastern, and American cuisine. Curly-leaf parsley is often used as a garnish. In central Europe, eastern Europe, and southern Europe, as well as in western Asia, many dishes are served with fresh green chopped parsley sprinkled on top. Flat-leaf parsley is similar, but is often preferred by chefs because it has a stronger flavor. Root parsley is very common in central, eastern, and southern European cuisines, where it is eaten as a snack, or as a vegetable in many soups, stews, and casseroles.

== Etymology ==
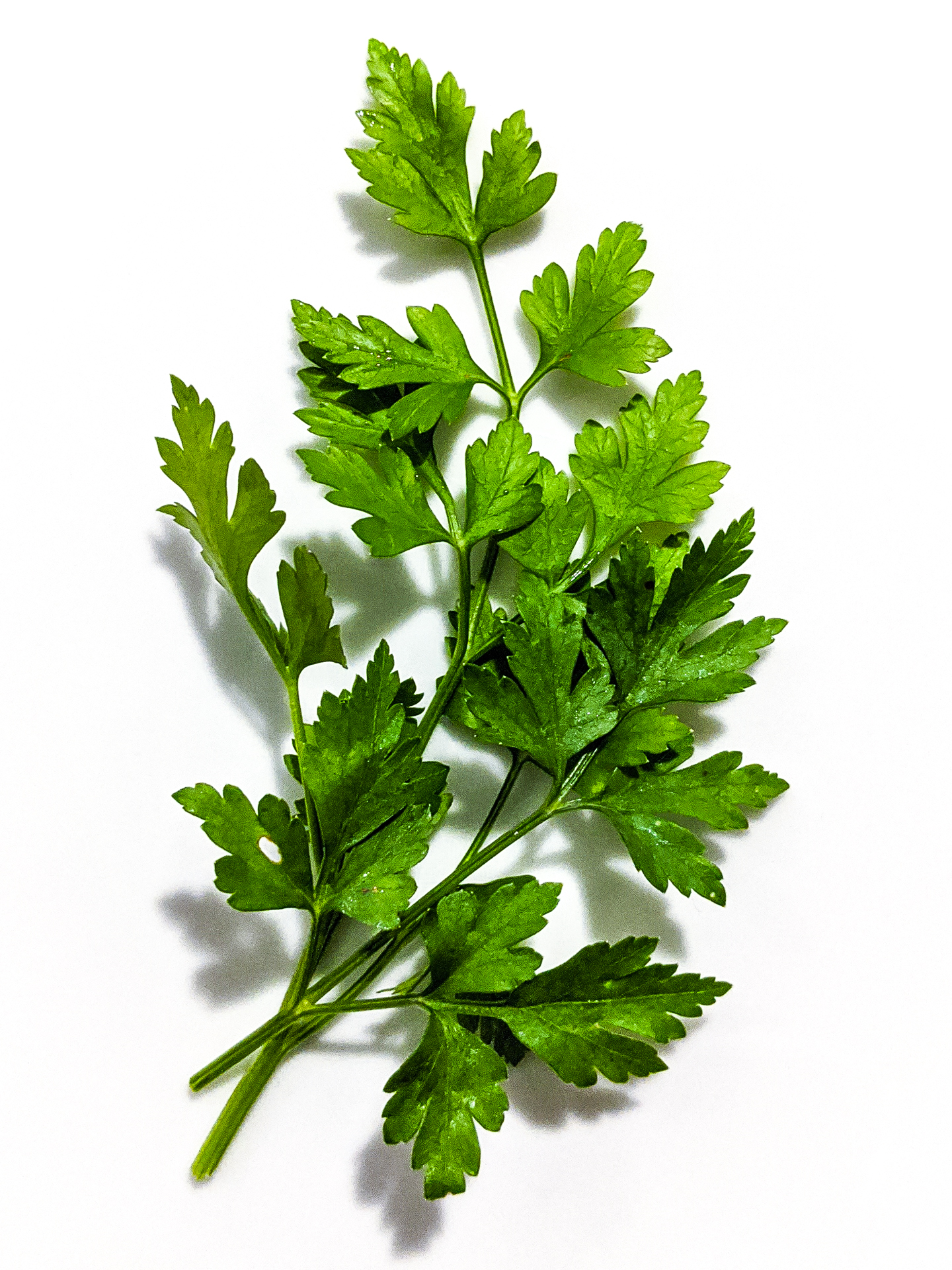
A parsley stem

The word "parsley" is a merger of Old English petersilie (which is identical to the contemporary German word for parsley: Petersilie) and the Old French peresil. Both of these names are derived from Medieval Latin petrosilium, from Latin petroselinum, which is the latinization of the Greek πετροσέλινον, petroselinon, 'rock-celery', from πέτρα, petra, 'rock, stone' and σέλινον, selinon, 'celery'. Mycenaean Greek se-ri-no, in Linear B, is the earliest attested form of the word selinon.

== Description ==
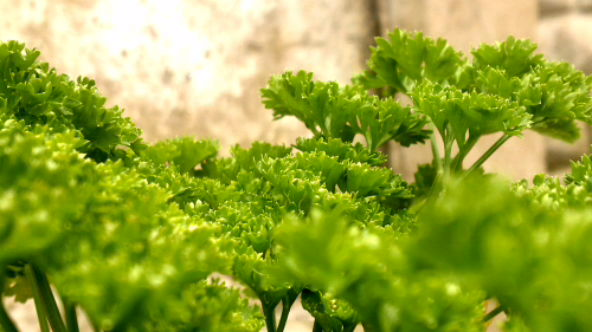
Curly parsley leaves

Garden parsley is a bright green, biennial plant in temperate climates, or an annual herb in subtropical and tropical areas.

Where it grows as a biennial, in the first year, it forms a rosette of tripinnate leaves 10–25 cm (3.9–9.8 in) long with numerous 1–3 cm leaflets, and a taproot used as a food store over the winter. In the second year, it grows a flowering stem to 75 cm (30 in) tall with sparser leaves and flat-topped 3–10 cm diameter umbels with numerous 2 mm diameter yellow to yellowish-green flowers.

The seeds are ovoid, 2–3 mm long, with prominent style remnants at the apex. One of the compounds of the essential oil is apiole. The plant normally dies after seed maturation.

== Uses ==
=== Culinary ===
Parsley is widely used in Middle Eastern, Mediterranean, Brazilian, and American cuisine. Curly leaf parsley is used often as a garnish. Green parsley is used frequently as a garnish on potato dishes (boiled or mashed potatoes), on rice dishes (risotto or pilaf), on fish, fried chicken, lamb, goose, and steaks, as well as in meat or vegetable stews (including shrimp creole, beef bourguignon, goulash, or chicken paprikash).

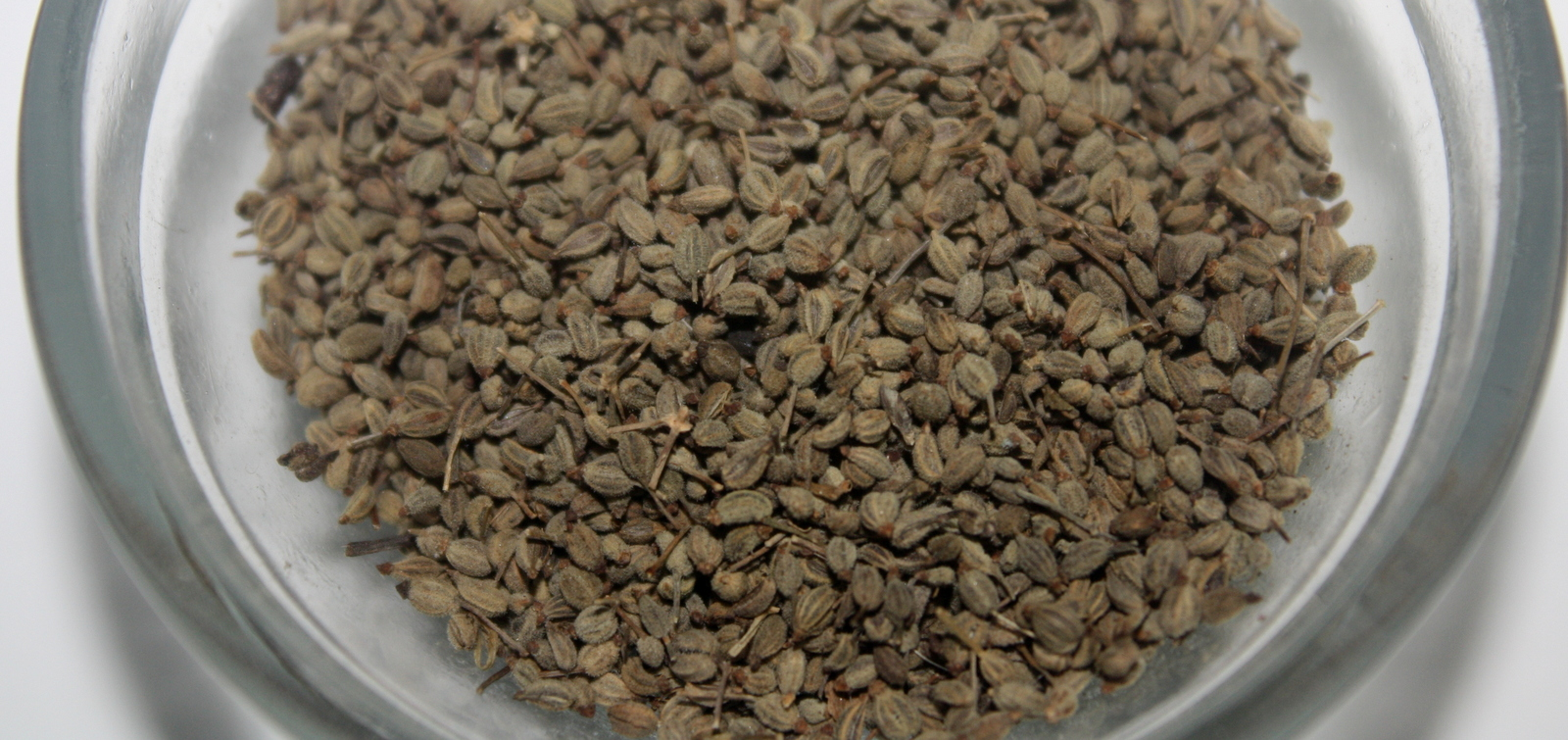
Parsley seeds

Parsley seeds are, by some people, used in cooking, imparting a stronger parsley flavor than leaves. However, seeds are toxic (containing high quantities of the compound apiol) and therefore their use should be avoided.

Parsley, when consumed, is credited with neutralising odours associated with garlic in cooking.

In central Europe, eastern Europe, and southern Europe, as well as in western Asia, many dishes are served with fresh green, chopped parsley sprinkled on top. In southern and central Europe, parsley is part of bouquet garni, a bundle of fresh herbs used as an ingredient in stocks, soups, and sauces. Freshly chopped green parsley is used as a topping for soups such as chicken soup, green salads, or salads such as salade Olivier, and on open sandwiches with cold cuts or pâtés.

Persillade is a mixture of chopped garlic and chopped parsley in French cuisine.

Parsley sauce is a cream sauce seasoned with parsley in British cuisine, with a variant called "liquor" served with a traditional pie and mash dish.

Parsley is the main ingredient in Italian salsa verde, which is a mixed condiment of parsley, capers, anchovies, garlic, and sometimes bread, soaked in vinegar. It is an Italian custom to serve it with bollito misto or fish. Gremolata, a mixture of parsley, garlic, and lemon zest, is a traditional accompaniment to the Italian veal stew, ossobuco alla milanese.

Root parsley is very common in Central, Eastern, and Southern European cuisines, where it is used as a snack or a vegetable in many soups, stews, and casseroles, and as ingredient for broth.

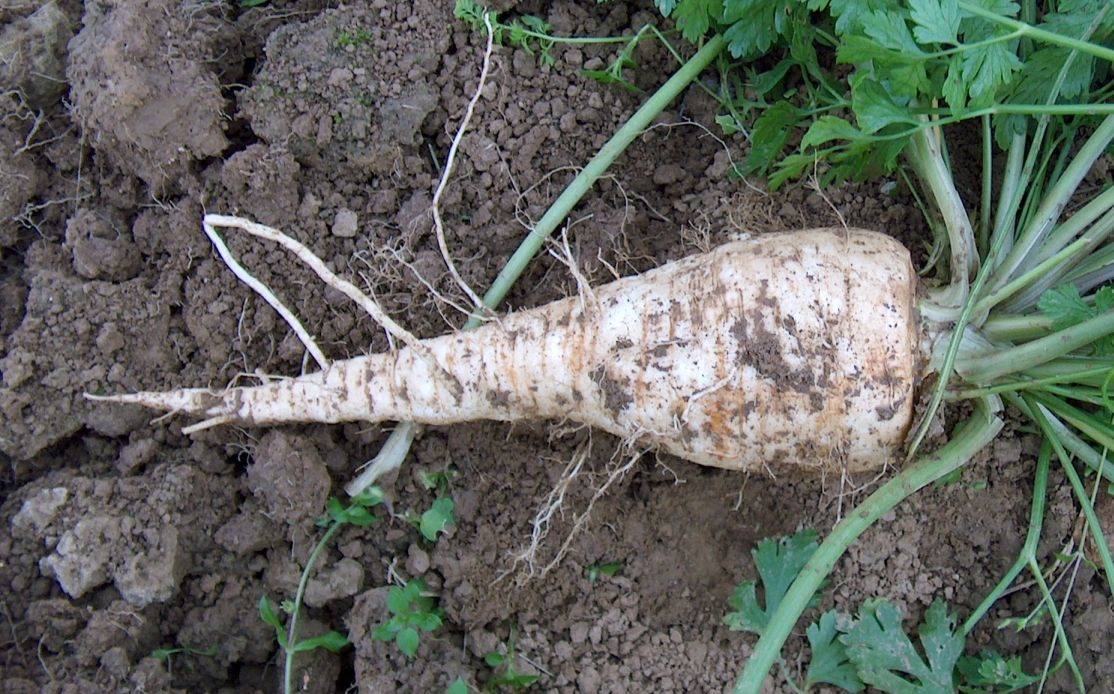
Parsley root

Freshly chopped parsley (salsa) and freshly chopped scallion (cebolinha) are the main ingredients in the herb seasoning called cheiro-verde (literally "green aroma"), which is used as key seasoning for major Brazilian dishes, including meat, chicken, fish, rice, beans, stews, soups, vegetables, salads, condiments, sauces, and stocks. Cheiro-verde is sold in food markets as a bundle of both types of fresh herbs. In some Brazilian regions, chopped parsley may be replaced by chopped coriander (also called cilantro, coentro in Portuguese) in the mixture.

Parsley is a key ingredient in several Middle Eastern salads such as Lebanese tabbouleh; it is also often mixed in with the chickpeas and/or fava beans while making falafel (that gives the inside of the falafel its green color). It is also a main component of the Iranian stew ghormeh sabzi.

Parsley is a component of a standard Seder plate arrangement, it is eaten to symbolize the flourishing of the Jews after first arriving in Egypt.

== Composition ==
=== Nutritional content ===
Parsley, fresh
Nutritional value per 100 g (3.5 oz)
- Energy: 151 kJ (36 kcal)
- Carbohydrates: 6.33 g
- Sugars: 0.85 g
- Dietary fiber: 3.3 g
- Fat: 0.79 g
- Protein: 2.97 g
Vitamins and minerals
Vitamins	Quantity %DV^{†}
Vitamin A equiv. beta-Carotene lutein zeaxanthin	47% 421 μg 47% 5054 μg 5561 μg
Thiamine (B1)	7% 0.086 mg
Riboflavin (B2)	7% 0.09 mg
Niacin (B3)	8% 1.313 mg
Pantothenic acid (B5)	8% 0.4 mg
Vitamin B6	5% 0.09 mg
Folate (B9)	38% 152 μg
Vitamin C	148% 133 mg
Vitamin E	5% 0.75 mg
Vitamin K	1367% 1640 μg
Minerals	Quantity %DV^{†}
Calcium	11% 138 mg
Iron	34% 6.2 mg
Magnesium	12% 50 mg
Manganese	7% 0.16 mg
Phosphorus	5% 58 mg
Potassium	18% 554 mg
Sodium	2% 56 mg
Zinc	10% 1.07 mg
- Other constituents: Quantity
- Water: 88 g
- Link to USDA Database entry
- ^{†}Percentages estimated using US recommendations for adults, except for potassium, which is estimated based on expert recommendation from the National Academies.

Fresh parsley is 88% water, 6% carbohydrates, 3% protein, and 1% fat (table). In a reference amount of 100 g (3.5 oz), raw parsley supplies 36 calories and is a rich source (20% or more of the Daily Value, DV) of vitamin K, vitamin C, vitamin A, folate, and iron, with moderate content of other dietary minerals (table).

Fresh parsley contains apigenin and myricetin.

=== Precautions ===
Excessive consumption of parsley should be avoided by pregnant women. Normal food quantities are safe for pregnant women, but consuming excessively large amounts may have uterotonic effects.

== Cultivation ==
Parsley grows best in moist, well-drained soil, with full sun. It grows best between 22–30 °C (72–86 °F), and usually is grown from seed. Germination is slow, taking four to six weeks, and it often is difficult because of furanocoumarins in its seed coat. Typically, plants grown for the leaf crop are spaced 10 cm (3.9 in) apart, while those grown as a root crop are spaced 20 cm (7.9 in) apart to allow for the root development.

Parsley attracts several species of wildlife. Some swallowtail butterflies use parsley as a host plant for their larvae; their caterpillars are black and green striped with yellow dots, and will feed on parsley for two weeks before turning into butterflies. Bees and other nectar-feeding insects also visit the flowers.

=== Cultivars ===
Parsley is subdivided into several cultivar groups. Often these are treated as botanical varieties, despite being cultivated selections, not of natural botanical origin.

==== Leaf parsley ====
The two main groups of parsley used as herbs are French, or curly leaf (P. crispum Crispum group; syn. P. crispum var. crispum); and, Italian, or flat leaf (P. crispum Neapolitanum group; syn. P. crispum var. neapolitanum). Flat-leaved parsley is preferred by some gardeners as it is easier to cultivate, being more tolerant of both rain and sunshine, and is said to have a stronger flavor—although this is disputed—while curly leaf parsley is preferred by others because of its more decorative appearance in garnishing. A third type, sometimes grown in southern Italy, has thick leaf stems resembling celery.

==== Root parsley ====
Another type of parsley is grown as a root vegetable, the Hamburg root parsley (P. crispum Radicosum Group, syn. P. crispum var. tuberosum). This type of parsley produces much thicker roots than types cultivated for their leaves. Although seldom used in Britain and the United States, root parsley is common in central and eastern European cuisine, where it is used in soups and stews, or simply eaten raw, as a snack (similar to carrots).

Although root parsley looks similar to the parsnip, which is among its closest relatives in the family Apiaceae, its taste is quite different.

== Gallery ==
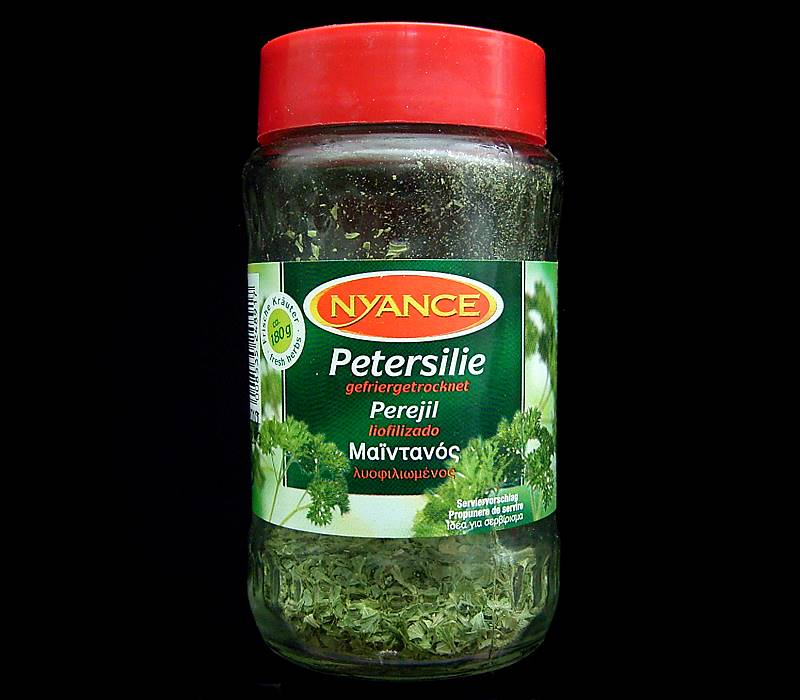
Freeze-dried parsley showing name in German, Spanish and Greek on the label

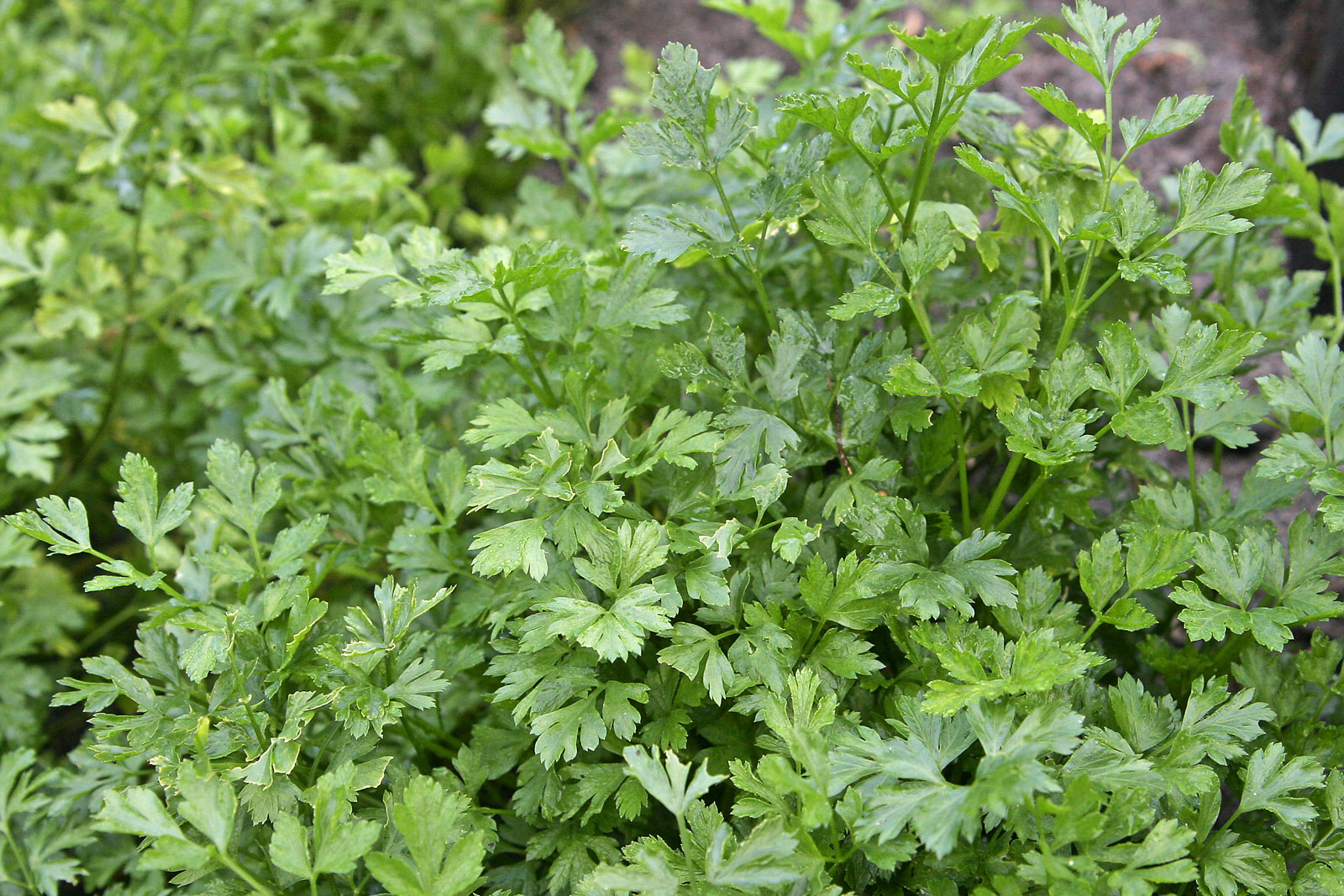
Flat-leaved parsley

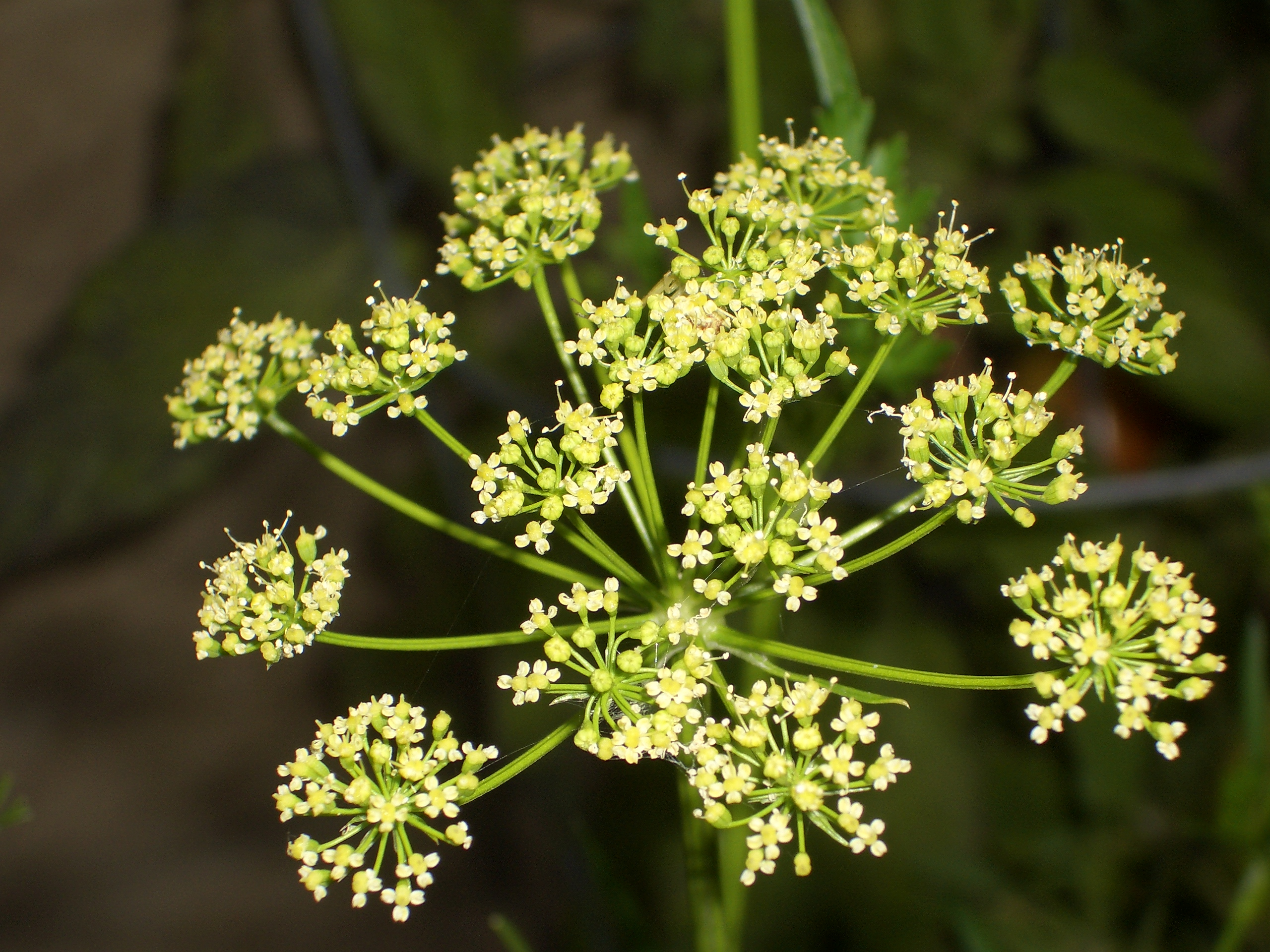
Flat-leaved parsley flower

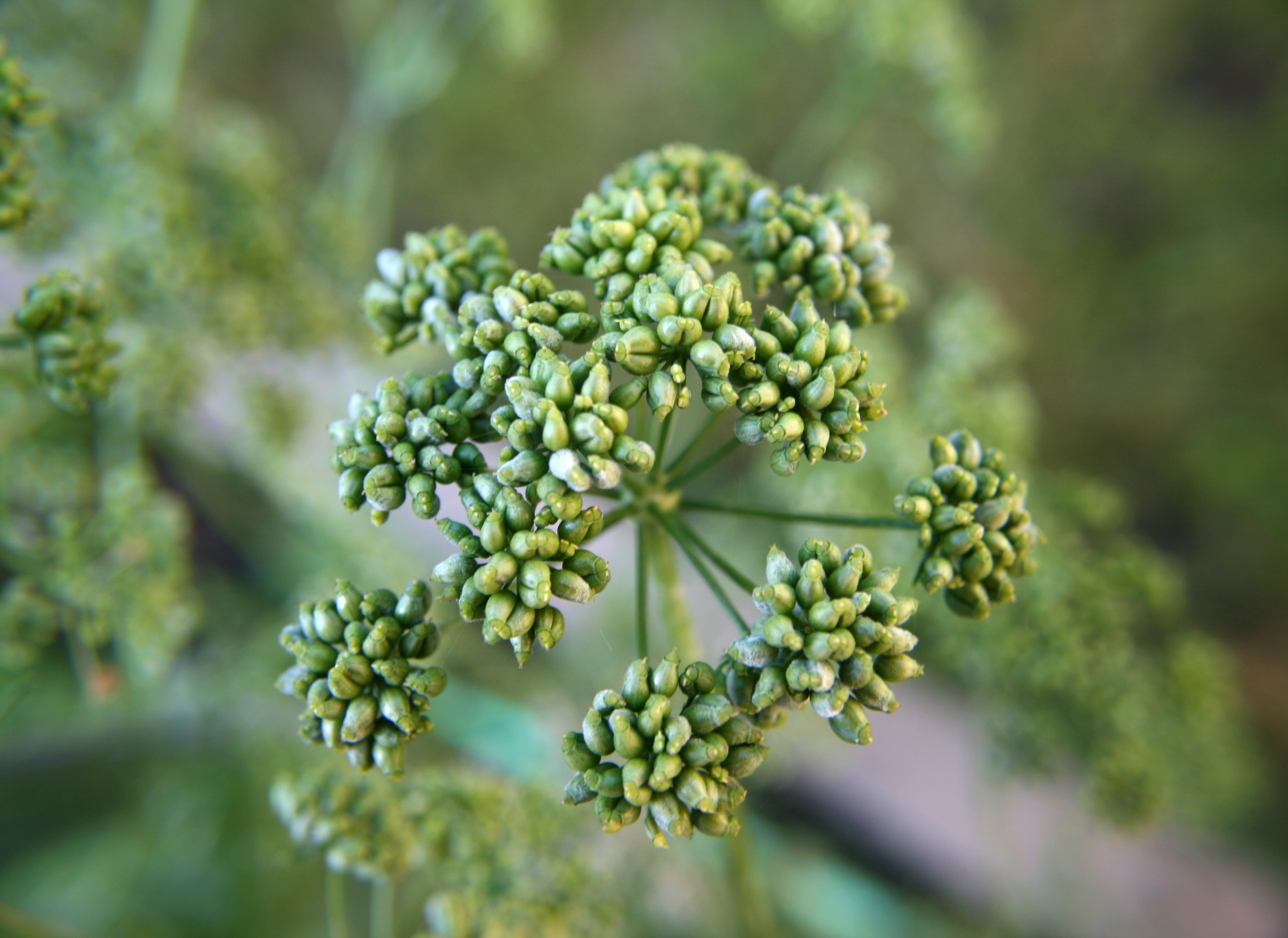
Immature seeds

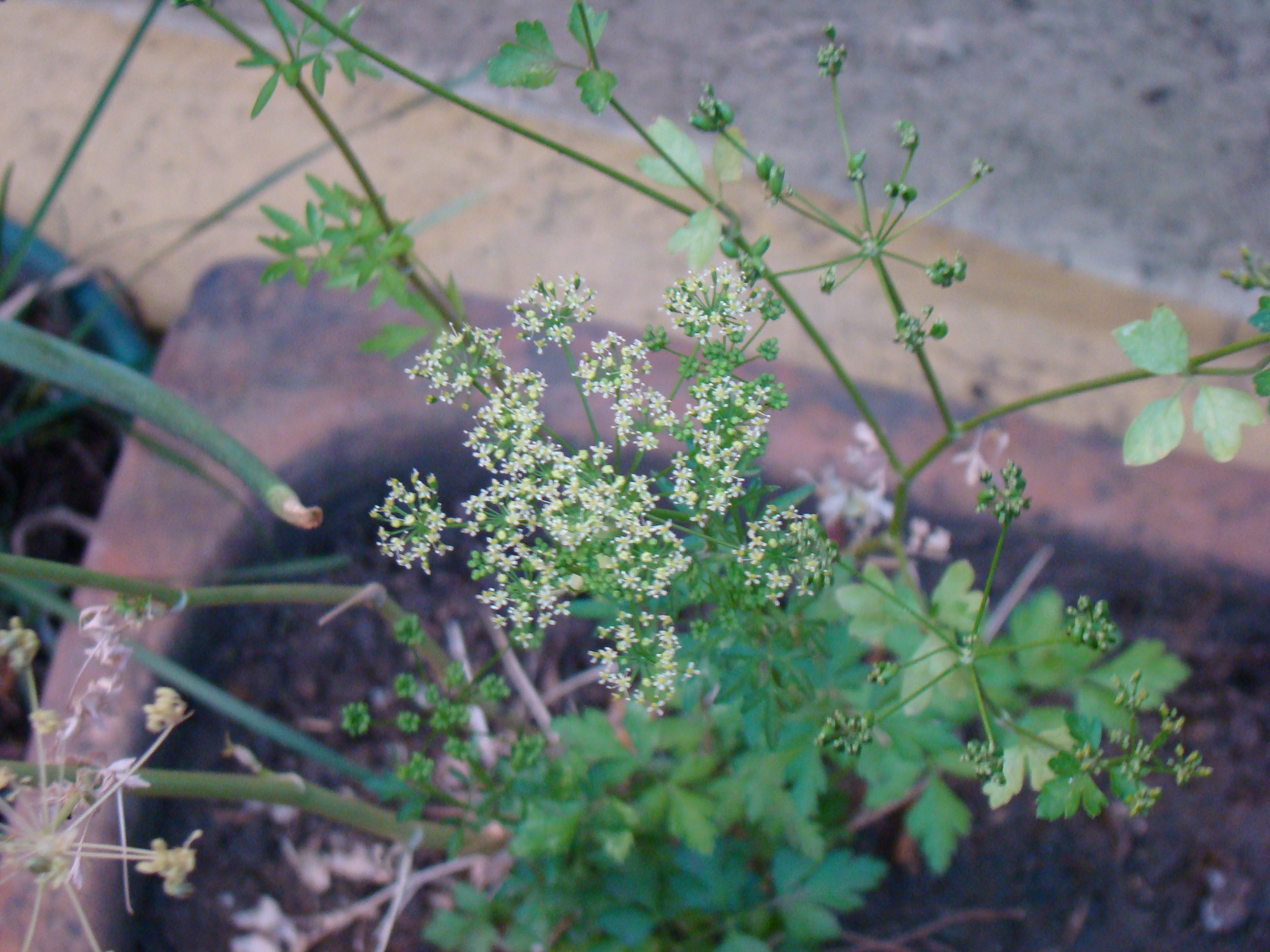
Flat-leaved parsley flower-Flor de perejil

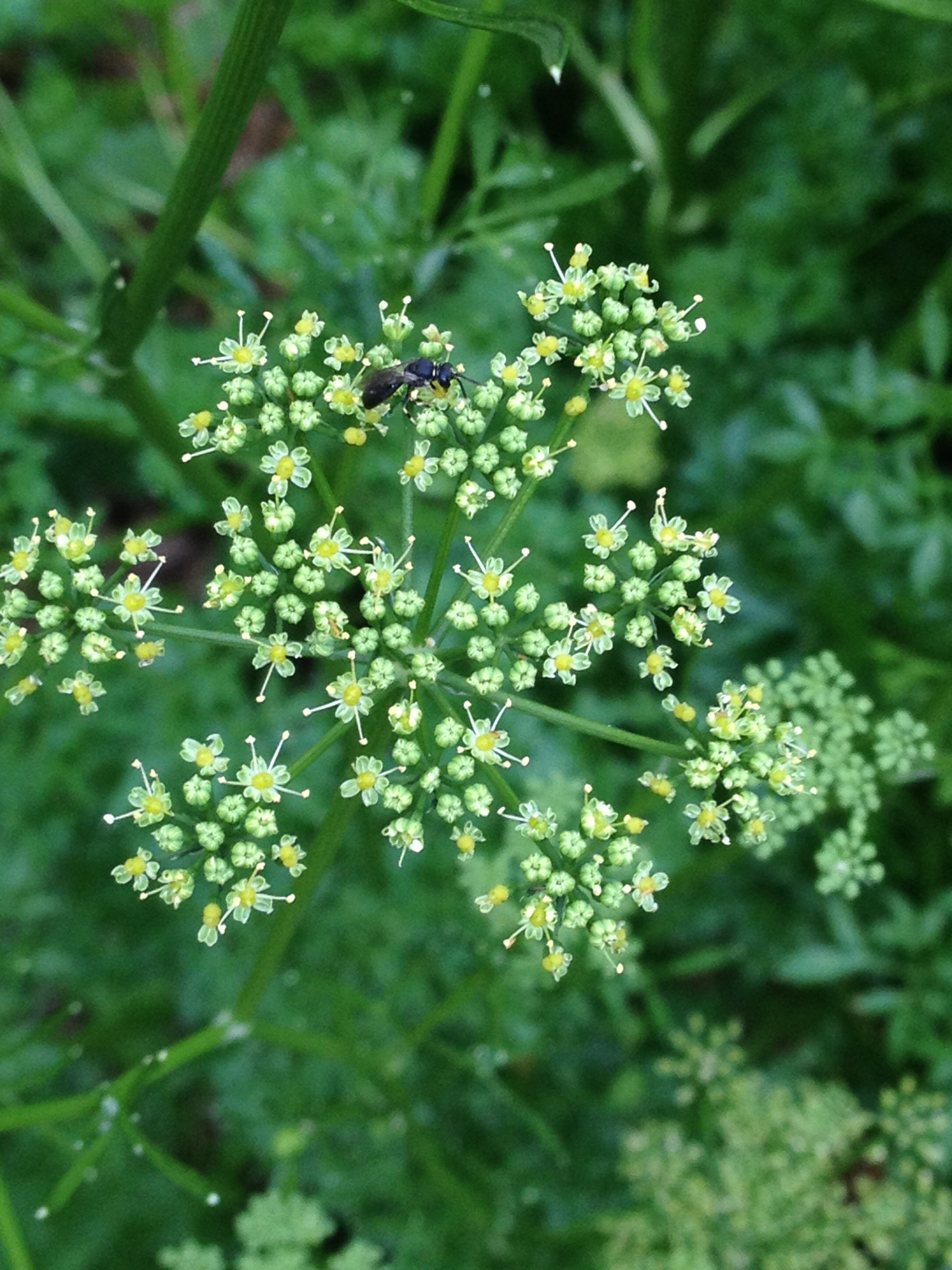
Bee pollinator on parsley Petroselinum crispum flower

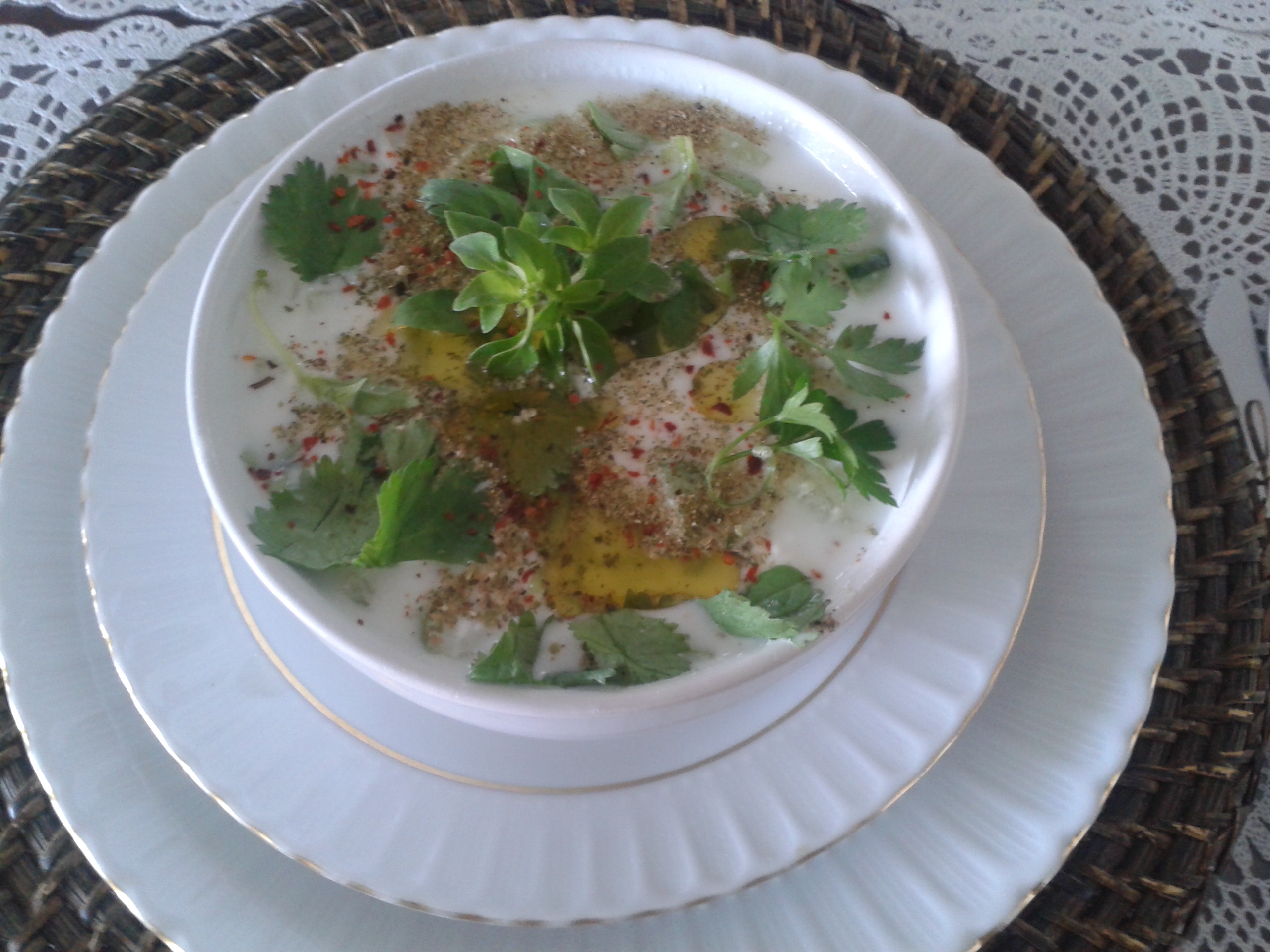
A yogurt-based soup garnished with parsley

== See also ==
- Apium virus Y
- List of culinary herbs and spices
- List of plants with edible leaves
- List of vegetables
- Oenanthe javanica
- Cryptotaenia japonica
