= Uruguayan cuisine =

Culinary traditions of Uruguay

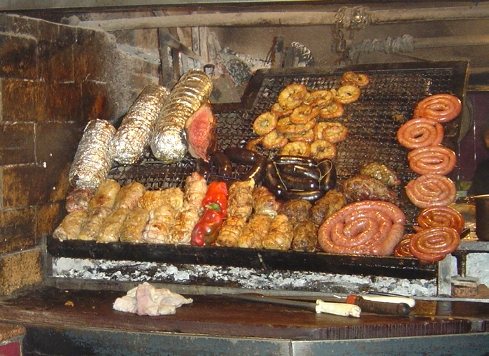
Asado with achuras (offal) and sausages

Uruguayan cuisine is a fusion of cuisines from several European countries, especially of Mediterranean foods from Spain, Italy, Portugal and France. Other influences on the cuisine resulted from immigration from countries such as Germany and Scotland. Uruguayan gastronomy is a result of immigration, rather than local Amerindian cuisine, because of late-19th and early 20th century immigration waves.

The base of the country's diet is meat and animal products: primarily beef but also chicken, lamb, pig and sometimes fish. The preferred cooking methods for meats and vegetables are still boiling and roasting, although modernization has popularized frying. Although Uruguay has considerable native flora and fauna, with the exception of yerba mate, native plants and animals are largely absent from Uruguayan cuisine. Popular sweets are membrillo quince jam and dulce de leche.

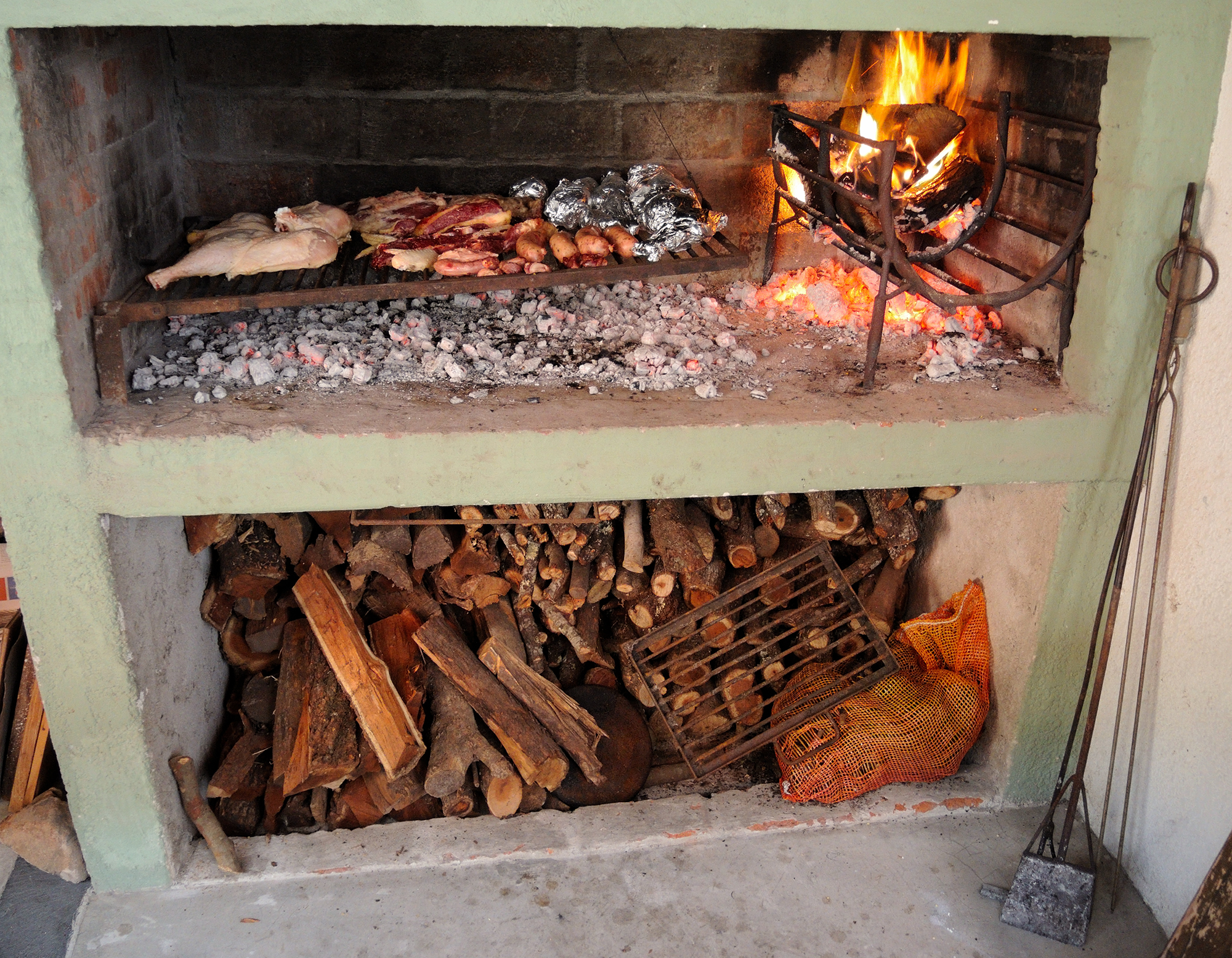
A typical Uruguayan parrillero

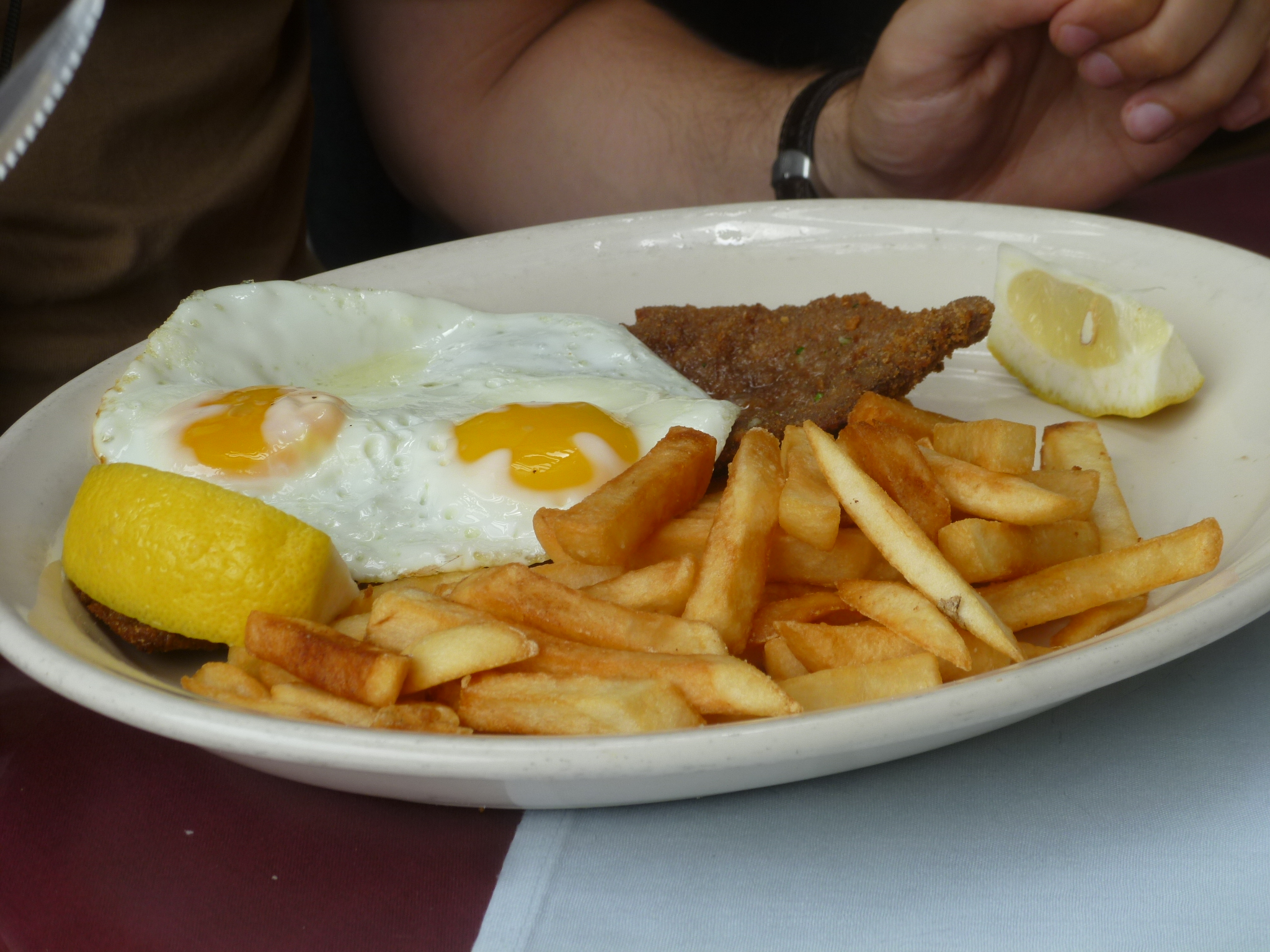
milanesa a caballo

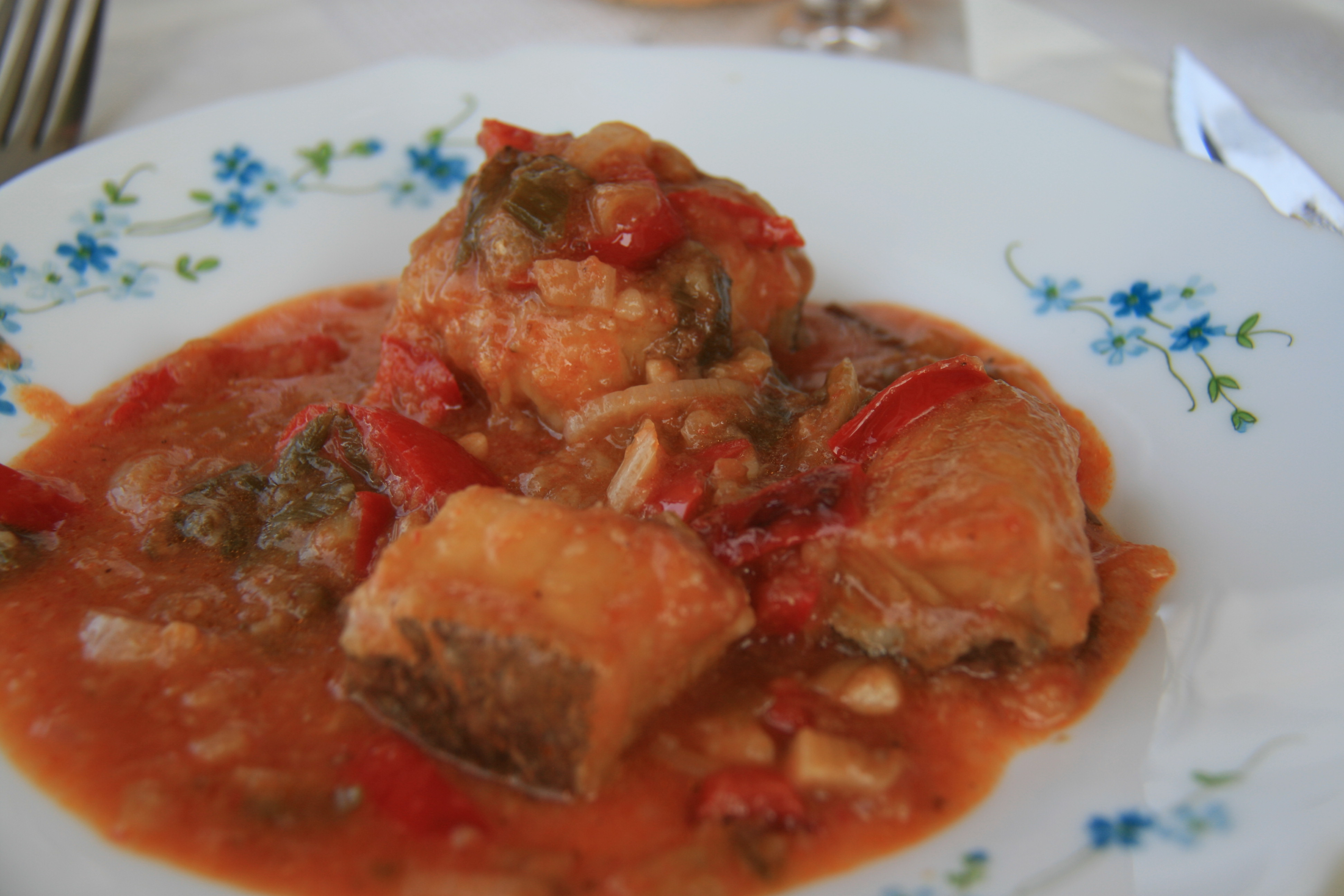
Bacalao typically served on Semana Santa (Easter).

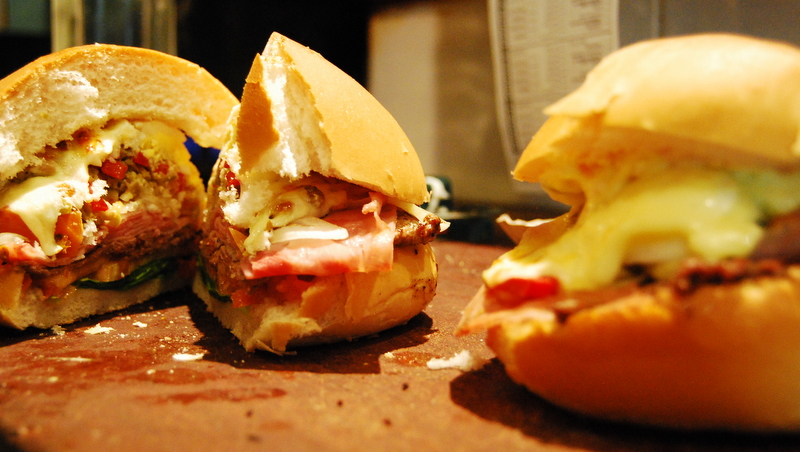
A chivito with lettuce, tomato, thin filet steak, bacon, ham, mushrooms, olives, mozzarella cheese, onion, egg, and garlic mayonnaise on a bun without sesame seeds

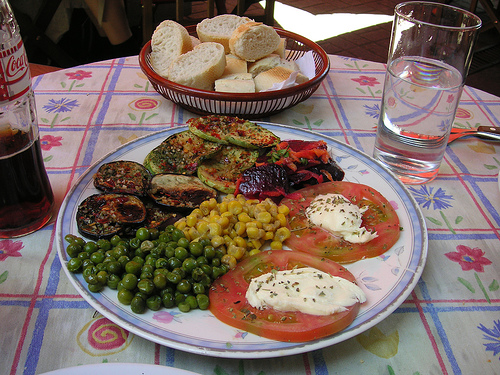
Vegetable starter with tomato, green peas, maize, eggplant and sweet peppers.

== Description ==
Uruguayan gastronomy is a result of immigration, rather than local Amerindian cuisine, because of late-19th and early 20th century immigration waves of, mostly, Italians. Uruguayan cuisine is a fusion of cuisines from several European countries, especially of Mediterranean foods from Spain, Italy, Portugal and France. Other influences on the cuisine resulted from immigration from countries such as Germany and Scotland. Although Uruguay has considerable native flora and fauna, with the exception of yerba mate, native plants and animals largely do not figure into Uruguayan cuisine.

The base of the country's diet is meat and animal products: primarily beef but also chicken, lamb, pig and sometimes fish. The preferred cooking methods for meats and vegetables are still boiling and roasting, although modernization has popularized frying (see milanesas and chivitos). Meanwhile, wheat and fruit are generally served fried (torta frita and pasteles), comfited (rapadura and ticholos de banana), and sometimes baked (rosca de chicharrones), a new modern style. Bushmeat comes from mulitas and carpinchos. Regional fruits like butia and pitanga are commonly used for flavoring caña, along with quinotos and nísperos.

Spanish influences are abundant: desserts like churros (cylinders of pastry, usually fried, sometimes filled with dulce de leche), flan, ensaimadas (Catalan sweet bread), and alfajores were all brought from Spain. There are also various kinds of stews known as guisos or estofados, arroces (rice dishes such as paella), and fabada (Asturian bean stew). All of the guisos and traditional pucheros (stews) are also of Spanish origin. Portuguese and Brazilian influence was also added during Portuguese colonization. Feijoada was incorporated into the rest of the guisos.

Uruguayan preparations of fish, such as dried salt cod (bacalao), calamari, and octopus, originate from the Basque and Galician regions, and also Portugal. Due to its strong Italian tradition, all of the famous Italian pasta dishes are present in Uruguay including ravioli, lasagne, tortellini, fettuccine, and the traditional gnocchi. Although the pasta can be served with many sauces, there is one special sauce that was created by Uruguayans. Caruso sauce is a pasta sauce made from double cream, meat, onions, ham and mushrooms. It is very popular with sorrentinos and agnolotti.

Additionally, there is Germanic influence in Uruguayan cuisine as well, particularly in sweet dishes. The pastries known as bizcochos are Germanic in origin: croissants, known as medialunas, are the most popular of these, and can be found in two varieties: butter- and lard-based. Also German in origin are the Berlinese known as bolas de fraile ("friar's balls"), and the rolls called piononos. The Biscochos were re-christened with local names given the difficult German phonology, and usually Uruguayanized by the addition of a dulce de leche filling. Even dishes like chucrut (sauerkraut) have also made it into mainstream Uruguayan dishes.

Polenta comes from Northern Italy and is very common throughout Uruguay. Unlike Italy, this cornmeal is eaten as a main dish, with tuco (meat sauce) and melted cheese and or ham.

== History ==
The current roots of Uruguayan cuisine can be traced back to a subsistence economy adopted by gauchos, and sustained on subsistence agriculture implanted by the Spanish and Criollos at the start of European colonization. The native peoples did not stay in one place, and Uruguay was used as a remote port, with few incursions for treasure hunting. The only permanent establishment at the time was constituted by Franciscan friars and was located in a territory now belonging to Brazil called Misiones, because their mission there was to Christianize the native peoples. The tradition of mate started during this time, with the monks brewing a beverage with the leaves of yerba mate that the Guarani people used to chew.

Cattle was later introduced by Hernando Arias de Saavedra. The first group of immigrants came from poor families from Buenos Aires and the Canary Islands, along with their empanadas and cocidos. Everything was sold from pulperias that were both stores and saloons. The asado tradition came with gauchos that lived in the country, descendants of those first families that having no land nor home, made cattle raiding their way of life.

Food was rudimentary and based on Spanish tradition until immigration at the end of the 19th century and the beginning of the 20th century when the first families came mostly from Italy and Spain. Immigration increased following World War I and World War II, when people from all over Europe and the Middle East came to Uruguay, including people from Germany, Russia, Italy, and Armenia. Such immigration enriched the importation of dishes, as there is now pasta, Russian salad and innumerable types of pastries from France and Germany, resulting in chajá and alfajores.

== Appetizers, entrees and snacks ==
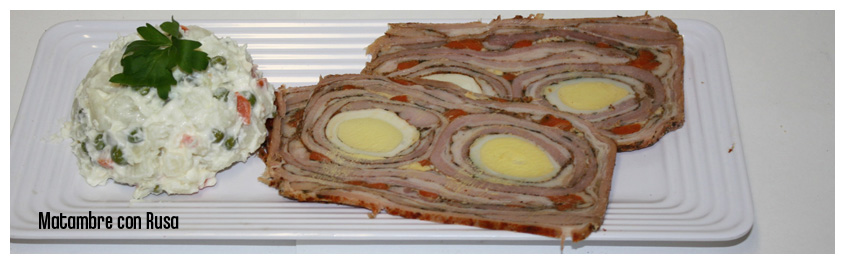
Matambre relleno with Russian salad

In Uruguayan cuisine, there is a significant list of preparations and dishes that are included in this category, the most typical or autochthonous is the picada, probably descending from the Spanish tapas, and as for everyday food there are also matambre relleno and lengua a la vinagreta.

=== Aperitif ===
Common spirits produced in Uruguay include grappa and caña; grappa is considered an excellent apéritif, and caña is considered a liqueur. Liquor made with caña has good digestive qualities and is mainly consumed as a drink and not as an aperitif. Apéritifs such as martini, vermouth, whisky, medio y medio (half and half) and also uvita, sangria and wine are popular.

Medio y medio is a special blend of dry wine and sparkling wine, or sparkling wine and caña (rum). Uvita is a fortified wine with caña that resembles marsala wine.

=== Entrees ===
==== Picada ====
Picada can be described as the main entrée of a typical asado (barbecue) and is consumed with aperitifs. It is constituted by cheese (typically Colonia, of Uruguayan origin), olives, longaniza, salami, chips and salted peanuts; peanuts and other snacks are served on small pots and all of the other ingredients are served on a wood table with slices of bread.

==== Matambre relleno ====
Matambre relleno is a common dish in Rio de la plata, both in Uruguay as in Argentina. It is one of two dishes prepared from matambre, a meat cut that is a flank steak. It is prepared as luncheon meat by rolling thin slices over spinach, carrots and boiled eggs, tied up and sewn with a strong string, boiled and later pressed and consumed cold.

==== Lengua a la vinagreta ====
Lengua a la vinagreta (Spanish for tongue with vinaigrette) is a cold preparation of beef tongue that is previously peeled and boiled and served with a vinagreta sauce made with chopped boiled eggs, parsley, garlic, onions, olive oil, and vinegar.

==== Pescado en escabeche ====
Escabeche is a preserved method common in Spain and Spanish-speaking countries. It consists of a mix of oil and vinegar that is used as a marination that also preserves the food.

Pescado en escabeche (escabeche fish) is a cold dish often made from Argentine hake that is buttered as in pescado a la marinera.

After being separately fried, it is parboiled on a vinaigrette made of oil and vinegar that is added to sliced onions and carrots and whole garlic cloves and black pepper.

== Side dishes ==
Food is mostly eaten with bread, and sometimes rice, salad or chips. Along with asado, accompaniments are chorizo, morcilla, offal, and also stuffed peppers, and papas al plomo (roasted potatoes).

== Sauces ==
The most notable sauces in Uruguayan cuisine are chimichurri, salsa criolla and salsa Caruso.

=== Picantina ===
Picantina is a spicy sauce commonly added to frankfurters (panchos), hungaras, choripanes and hamburgers. It is common to find in fast food dispensers in the street and is locally called 'carritos'. It resembles hot mustard or mayonnaise.

=== Mojo ===
Sharing the same name as the Spanish mojo, it is a simple sauce made with garlic, oil, parsley, oregano, paprika, water and salt, and is added to asado during the cooking process and optionally on the dish. Mojo differs from chimichurri in that it has water besides vinegar and less paprika.

=== Chimichurri ===
Chimichurri is between a vinaigrette and a pesto variant, made with parsley, chopped garlic, oregano, red pepper flakes, paprika, oil, vinegar, and salt. Along with salsa criolla it is preferred for asado.

=== Salsa criolla ===
Made with finely chopped tomatoes and onions, oil and salt, salsa criolla is used for garment of asado, choripán and sometimes panchos.

=== Salsa golf ===
Salsa golf is a cold sauce of somewhat thick consistency, common in Argentina. It is made from mayonnaise with a smaller amount of tomato-based sauce such as ketchup, as well as seasonings including pimento, oregano, and cumin.

=== Mostaza La pasiva ===
La Pasiva is a famous chain of restaurants in Uruguay, dedicated to fast food or minutas, as known in the region. Their specialties are panchos and hungaras and they are renowned for their chivito. Moustard La pasiva is a white-colored hot mustard served along with panchos. It is made with beer, starch, mustard grains, pepper, salt and vinegar. Though it has never been sold commercially, small quantities are sometimes given as a gift for clients.

Mostaza La pasiva is also used among other mustards as a sauce for puchero meat.

=== Salsa Caruso, estofado and tuco ===
All three are necessary pasta sauces among other foreign pasta sauces. Salsa Caruso was made in honor of the opera singer Enrico Caruso and became a popular sauce (especially for its main dish 'cappelettis a la Caruso'); estofado is a stewed version of ragu made from steaks and sometimes eaten alone; tuco, when it is with chopped meat, resembles a bolognese sauce.

== Barbecue and salads ==
=== Salads ===
Uruguayan cuisine has adopted and created many salads, the most typical being ensalada criolla.

==== Ensalada criolla ====
With slight variants, it is common for a family of salads that are widespread over the southern south cone region; most variants as in the Chilean salad always include onion and lettuce. The salad common to Uruguay contains tomato along with lettuce and onion and is served with a single vinaigrette made of oil, vinegar, salt, garlic, and oregano. As it is a basic form of salad, it is an ideal accompaniment for asado.

==== Ensalada rusa ====
More similar to the polish sałatka jarzynowa than the typical olivier salad, it contains potatoes, carrots, and peas with mayonnaise.

==== Ensalada de papa y huevo ====
This is a potato and egg salad or onion and potato salad or simply potato mayonnaise and parsley.

==== Ropa vieja ====
Resembling an old Spanish salpicon, ropa vieja (Spanish for old clothes) intends to include everything that exceeds from asado, mainly the best cuts of meat chopped with vegetables such as potatoes or ensalada criolla. It is not to be confused with the Cuban ropa vieja which is also a derivative dish but resembles more a sancocho than a salad.

==== Salpicon de ave ====
Another derivative salpicon, chicken salpicon is made with chicken, eggs, and potatoes.

==== Palmitos con salsa golf ====
Simply heart of palm sometimes rolled in ham slices and served with salsa.

==== Watercress salad ====
Basically watercress, olive oil and lemon juice.

== Asado ==
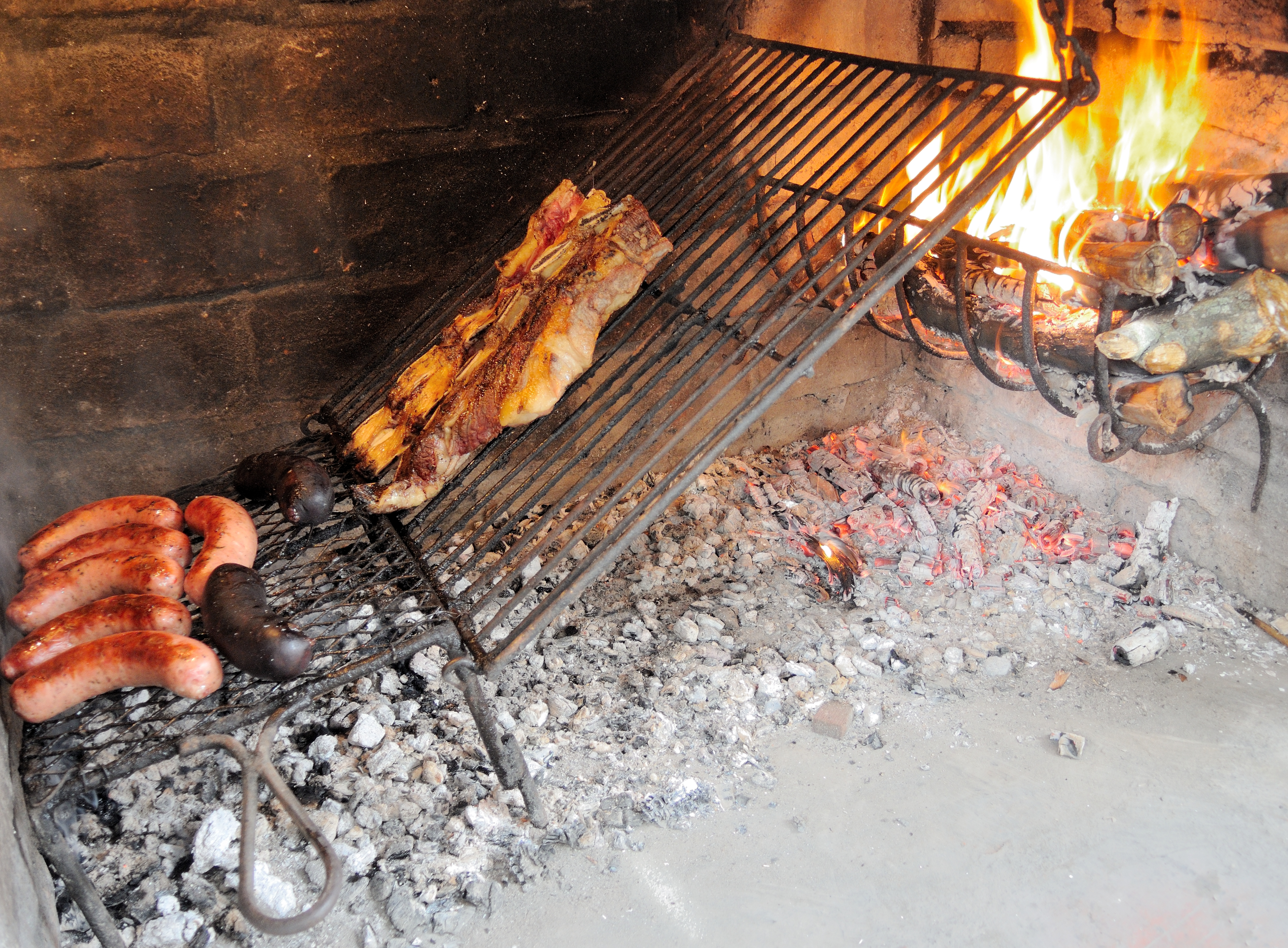
A typical parrilla with chorizos and morcillas

Barbecue asado can be said to make the meal or is the meal itself. The meal and cut of meat are also called asado or tira de asado.

In most Uruguayan homes, it is common to find a special grill on the patio called an asador. It is a structure made of iron and brick. Most asadores are at least two meters by one meter, have a chimney, a place for firewood and a large grill for the meat. Embers produced by the firewood are placed under the grill.

In many towns and cities, street vendors sell asado. These small barbecue grills are called medio tanque (half barrel), because they are made with on adaptation of a split steel drum. Asado cooked this way is sold often on the street as a snack or light lunch.

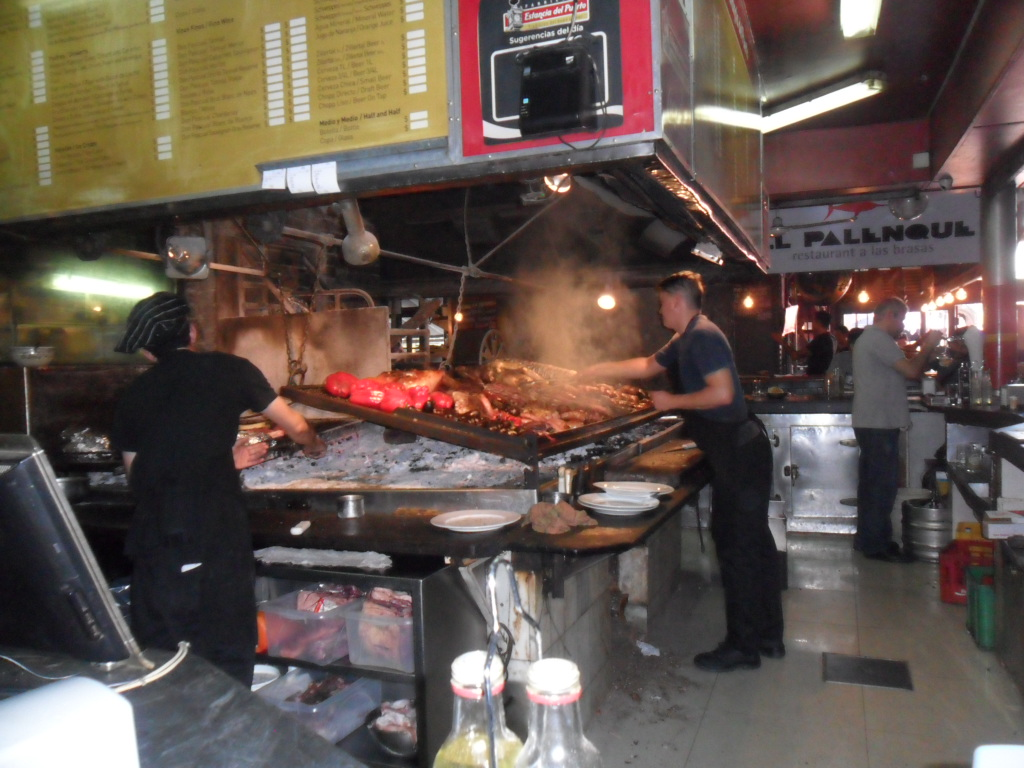
Line cooks grilling sausages and other meats in a market near the port of Montevideo, Uruguay.

In the larger cities, such as Montevideo, markets commonly have one or more grill stations where customers can order and eat asado directly at the bar, which may be served with offal, sausages, tapenades, and tapas. It is usually served with lager beer for lunch.

The person making the meal is also called asador.

Asado is often preceded by apéritives such as vermouth, uvita, and medio y medio, an entree called picada and some chorizos, morcillas, and some offal.

=== Ingredients ===
Ingredients of a complete Uruguayan asado include chorizo, morcilla, pulpon, entraña, tira de asado, cow gizzards, chinchulines, chotos, and kidneys. Poultry may also be included.

Sometimes, especially on festive days, pork, fish, and lamb are consumed as a substitute for beef, constituting a variant.

=== Preparation ===
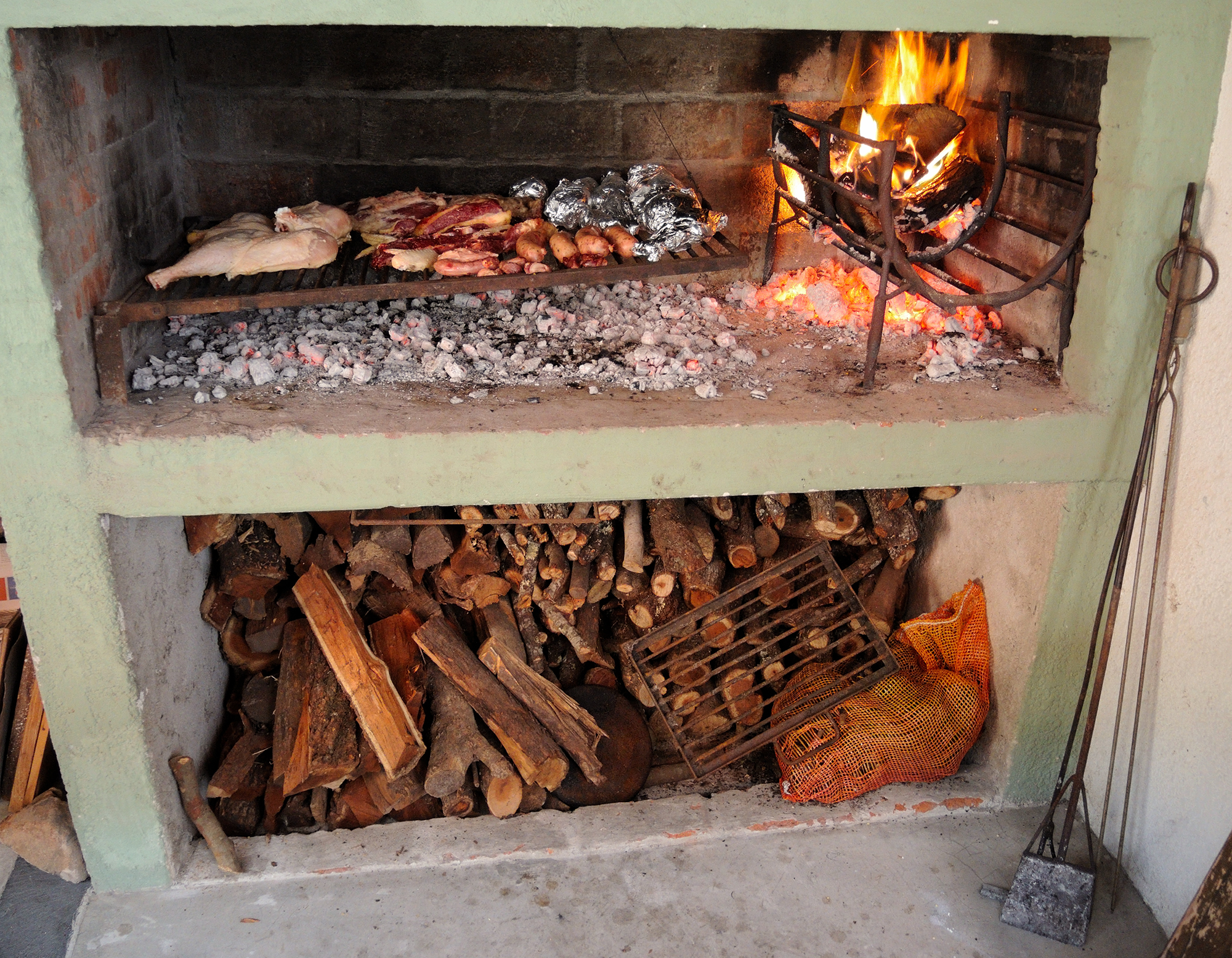
A parrilla

A typical asado takes from one hour to two hours to be prepared, and even more, if a different kind of meat is going to be barbecued (for example a whole pig takes at least four hours to be ready).

The asador starts the fire in the burner and, once the fire is started, the meat is salted and condiments added; condiments may include oregano, garlic, paprika, parsley and mojo. The first embers are put in place, the meat put on the grill and embers added to as they fall from the burner. The meat is slowly cooked and smoked on the asador and mojo is added periodically for flavor.

The meat is served with bread and salads, condiments such as mojo, chimichurri and Uruguayan salsa criolla and beverages such as wine, clerico and sangria.

=== Variants - Asado con cuero ===
Asado con cuero (barbecue with its leather), is a favorite variant rurally and is also appreciated in the capital. It requires a more complex technique than that employed for making asado in that the animal is barbecued whole and even with its hide, though the bones are discarded. This practice was initiated by the pampa people who, if they needed to move on in a hurry, could easily take with them the rolled-up meat.

== Beverages ==
Typical Uruguayan beverages are mate, caña, uvita, grappamiel and medio y medio (half and half). Although Uruguay has considerable native flora and fauna, with the exception of yerba mate, native plants and animals largely do not figure into Uruguayan cuisine. Wine is also a popular drink. Other spirits consumed in Uruguay are caña, grappa, lemon-infused grappa, and grappamiel (a grappa honey liquour).

=== Grappa ===
Grappa was brought by Italian immigrants as they kept coming at the immediation of SXIX. Grappamiel and grapa con limon were made in the Country from this Italian influence.

=== Uvita ===
A taste for wine was acquired from Mediterranean influence, also sangria and clerico. Uvita (little grape) is a fortified wine resembling marsala wine.

=== Medio y medio ===
Literally meaning half and half, medio y medio is a drink blend of caña and sparkling wine or dry wine and sparkling wine. It is made and sold under the trademark Roldos.

=== Mate ===
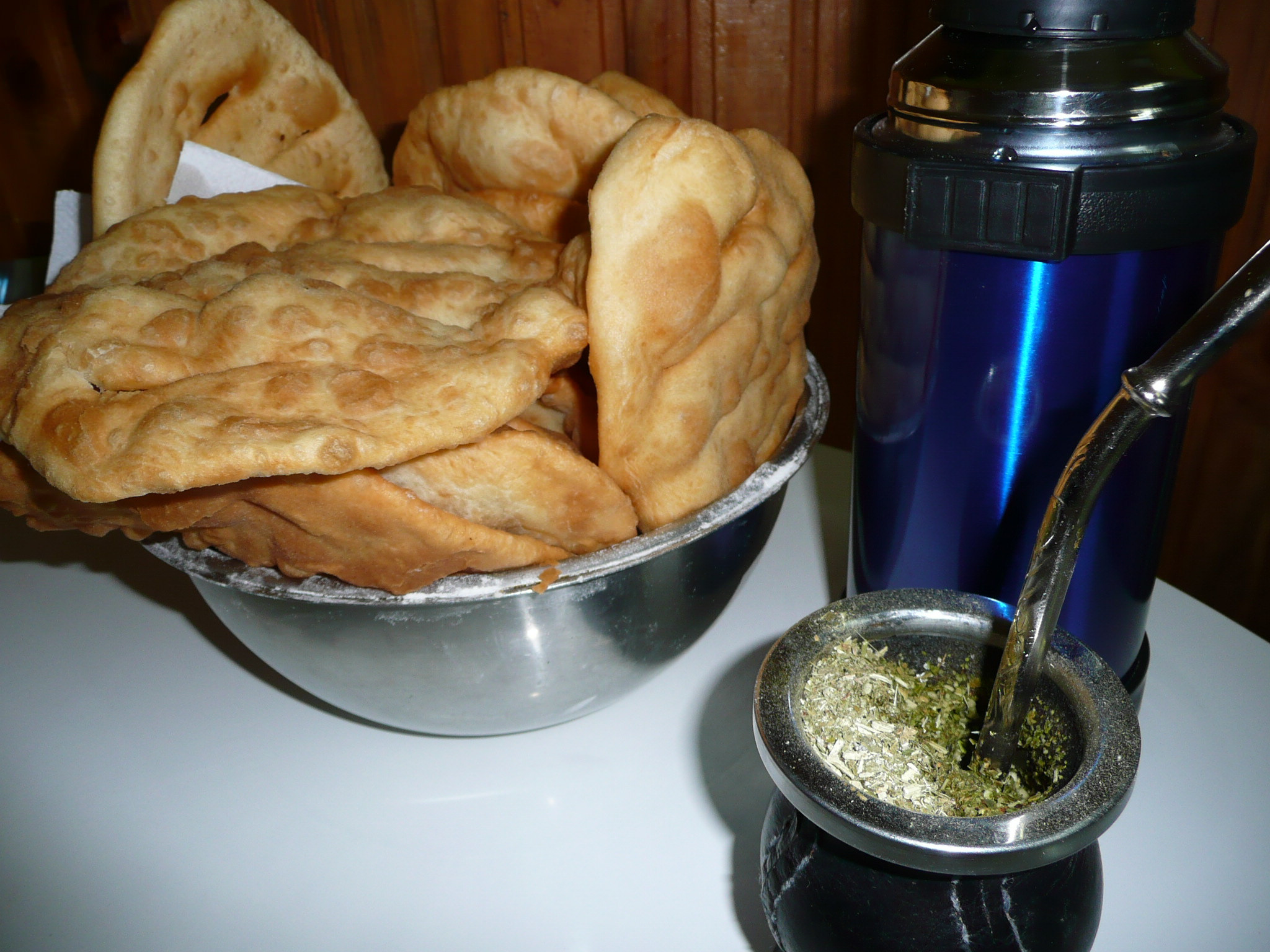
A typical Uruguayan mate with tortas fritas

Mate is consumed at any time and on any occasion, solely with tortas fritas or biscochos. It is so important that the act of drinking mate is a ritual of friendship between those involved. Even carrying a thermos of hot water facilitates this practice and on hot summer days it is still said to be refreshing.

The dried leaves and twigs of the yerba mate plant (Ilex paraguariensis) are placed in a small cup. Hot water is then poured into a gourd just below the boiling point, to avoid burning the herb and spoiling the flavor. The drink is sipped through a metal or reed straw, known as a bombilla.

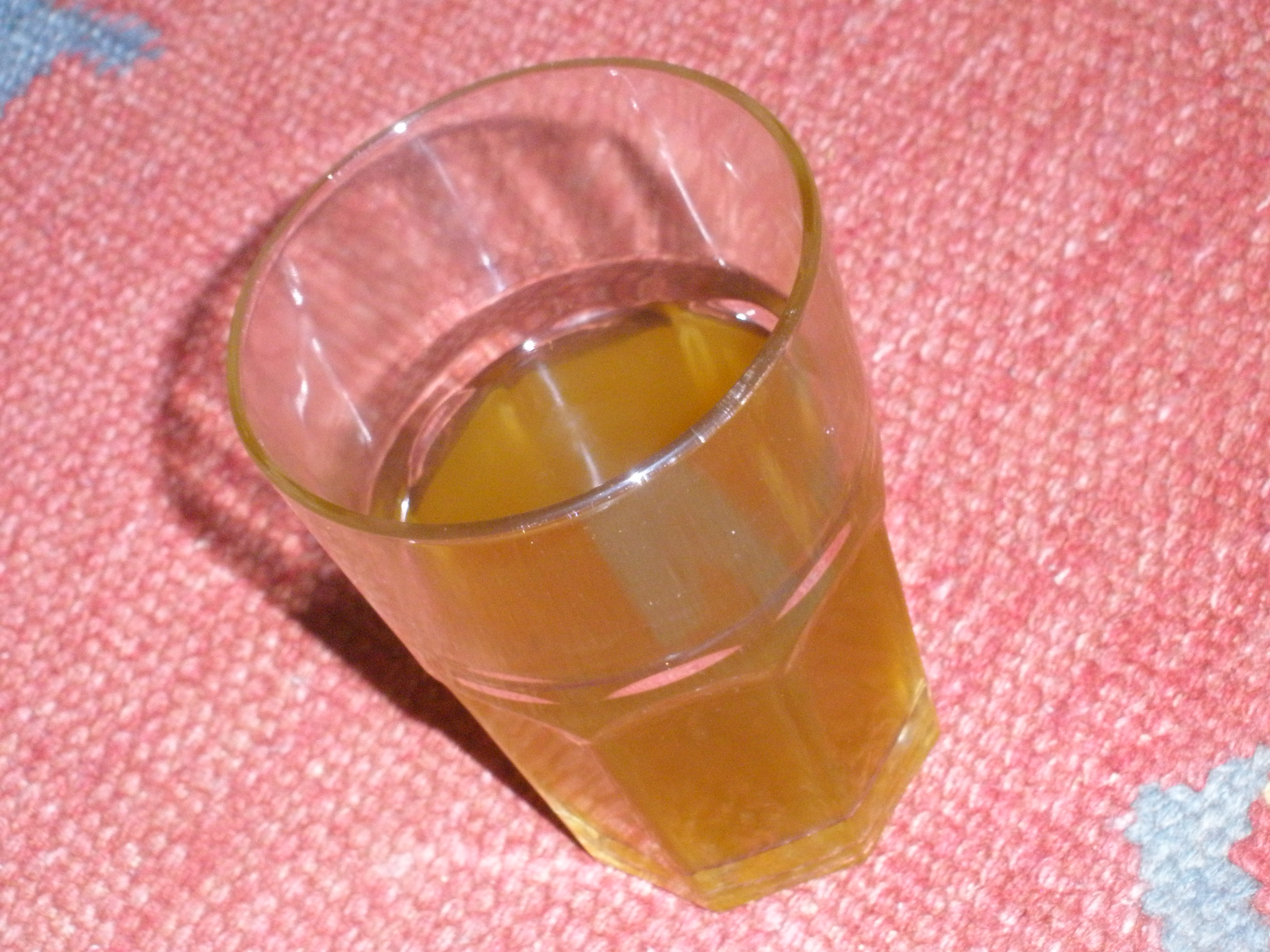
Mate cocido served in a glass

Uruguay is the first global consumer of mate, with a consumption of 6.8 kilograms of yerba mate per capita a year, surpassing Argentina by 1.2 kilograms per capita at year.

Yerba mate also is consumed as mate cocido. When it is prepared with milk it is called mate de leche and milk is added, it is called mate con leche.

=== Grapa con limon ===
Grappa is sold under various trademarks but the most significant one is San Remo. It is distilled and bottled by ANCAP and there was also an attempt to produce the original Italian grappa by some local cellars. When macerated with lemon it is called grapa con limon.

=== Caña ===
Caña is an amber-coloured drink distilled similar to aguardiente made from sugar cane mill. Its caramel colour is due to aging in barrels. It is distilled and bottled under the brand name De los 33.

=== Grappamiel ===
Grappamiel or Grapamiel is a mixed alcoholic beverage popular in Uruguay containing grappa, spirits obtained from various grains plus honey and water. In agreements with the European Union, the drink is a food protected by geographical indications. The definition is provided by CONSULTA Nº 4.548 of the Uruguay Government. Grappamiel is very popular in rural areas, and is often consumed in the cold autumn and winter mornings to warm up the body.

== Stews and puchero ==
Specially suitable for cold days, Uruguayan guisos or stews are highly revitalizing, especially for their puchero, followed by buseca, guiso carrero, guiso de fideos (noodle stew), estofado and feijoada.

Spanish culinary influence is marked in Uruguayan stews, Also there are Italian and Portuguese-Brazilian influences, this last coming from the Luso-Brazilian invasion of Uruguay.

=== Puchero ===
From Spanish tradition puchero, Uruguayan puchero differs not much from others of the region, it is like a rough soup where dry ingredients are separated from the broth after cooked to make two separate preparations, a new soup that is first consumed, and later the soup all the other succulent ingredients are consumed with bread.

A typical puchero may contain all type of cuts with bones, skirt steak, ossobucco, bacon, cabbage, sweet corn, rape, onions, celery, carrot, sweet potato, squash, and potatoes.

All these ingredients cut in big pieces are cooked and served, with the broth are made different soups containing small noodles, rice or any cereal of predilection.

It is usual that each commensal makes their puree on his dish with all the cooked vegetables that have been served, aligning it with oil if desired, and also to take off the caracu (bone marrow) from the ossobucco bone and spread it over pieced bread.

Mustards of the brand Savora and also La pasiva are used for garnishing puchero meat.

=== Ensopado ===
A dish for summer days and popular on rural areas, consisted on broth, noodles and gross slices of meat, chorizo sausage and tocino bacon boiled together.

Its vegetable composition is reduced due is pretended to not ferment on hot days, so it only has few onions and squash.

Its name comes from verb ensopar (to moist, to soup), participle ensopado (being souped).

=== Guiso carrero ===
Sometimes it is hard to say what is Argentinian and what is Uruguayan (history links people strongly). Guiso carrero is part of not only cuisine, but Uruguayan folklore. It is a succulent meal consistent of meat, butterbeans, and noodles.

Guiso carrero is a stew containing potato, sweet potato, noodles, squash, onion, tomato, beans, and meat.

Guiso carrero is served with red wine, bread and grated cheese.

When guiso carrero does not contain noodles, it is called guiso de porotos, and when it does not have beans, it is called guiso de fideos or ensopado.

=== Buseca ===
Buseca from Italian tradition also known as cazuela de mondongo in Spain.

Its main ingredient is the mondongo, which is a tripe from the cow's stomach, it is pre-cooked and boiled along with meat, chorizo, peachick, tomato and potato.

=== Feijoada ===
A dish originating from Portuguese Brazilian influence that takes a bit from the main Rioplatense culture.

Very popular all over Brazil, feijoada also is popular in Uruguay (though not in Argentina). Consumed not only on the northeast but also all along with the country, it is a black bean stew that, unlike the Brazilian feijoada, comes with potatoes (besides bananas and fariña), and made with beef more often than pork. It is also common to find chorizo and chorizo Colorado in Uruguayan feijoada.

=== Bacalao ===
Bacalao is a dry fish stew made from dried and salted cod, chickpeas, onions, potatoes, tomato sauce, and parsley, it is usually consumed on Uruguay over Easter, as it is a Spanish catholic tradition.

=== Italian-style stews ===
Also very popular on Uruguayan cuisine, ragu-style stews still are very popular, such as albondigas con papas and estofado.

==== Niños envueltos ====
Literally meaning wrapped children, a stew consisting of small wraps the length of a human finger. They are made of loin slices that are filled with bacon, spinach, and carrots, and later boiled in a tomato sauce and served with peas and boiled potatoes.

==== Estofado ====
Made from poultry or cow meat, it is called estofado de pollo when made with poultry and estofado de carne when it has cow meat. It is a dish that contains meat and chorizo or chicken, stewed in tomato sauce, and sometimes served with a side of boiled potatoes or pasta.

==== Albondigas con papas ====
Spanish for meatballs with potatoes, albondigas con papas is a dish made from meatballs boiled in tomato sauce with potatoes and peas.

Albondigas con papas are eaten with cheese and parsley.

== Minutas ==
Minuta is the local name for Río de la Plata's fast food.

Common side dishes are fried eggs, croquetas, French fries, purée, and salads.

The most notable minutas are milanesas, refuerzos such as choripanes, chivitos and pizza and faina; also, the bauru is common along the Brazilian border.

=== Choripan ===
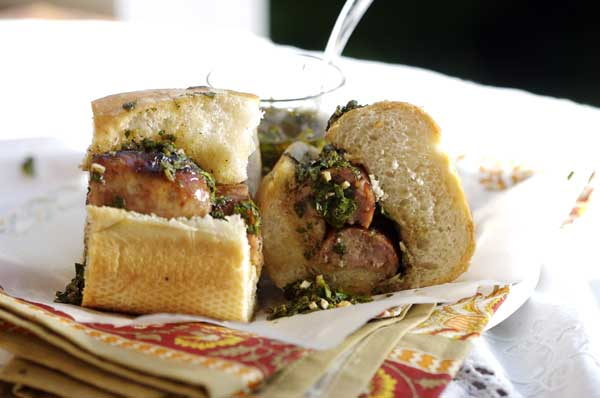
A Choripan sandwich

Choripan, Spanish portmanteau for sausage (chorizo) and bread (pan) also called chorizo al pan (sausage on bread), is a sandwich made with barbecued chorizo (that is sliced in half to fit), mayonnaise, ketchup, tomato, lettuce, onions, etc.

=== Hungaras ===
Hungaras are like panchos, boiled sausages but more spicy and thinner and longer; like panchos also they come served on bread and they are found on the street served as fast food and also sold apart in supermarkets.

=== Milanesas ===
Milanesa (from Italian cotoletta alla milanese) is a thin breaded cutlet that can be veal, chicken or fish.

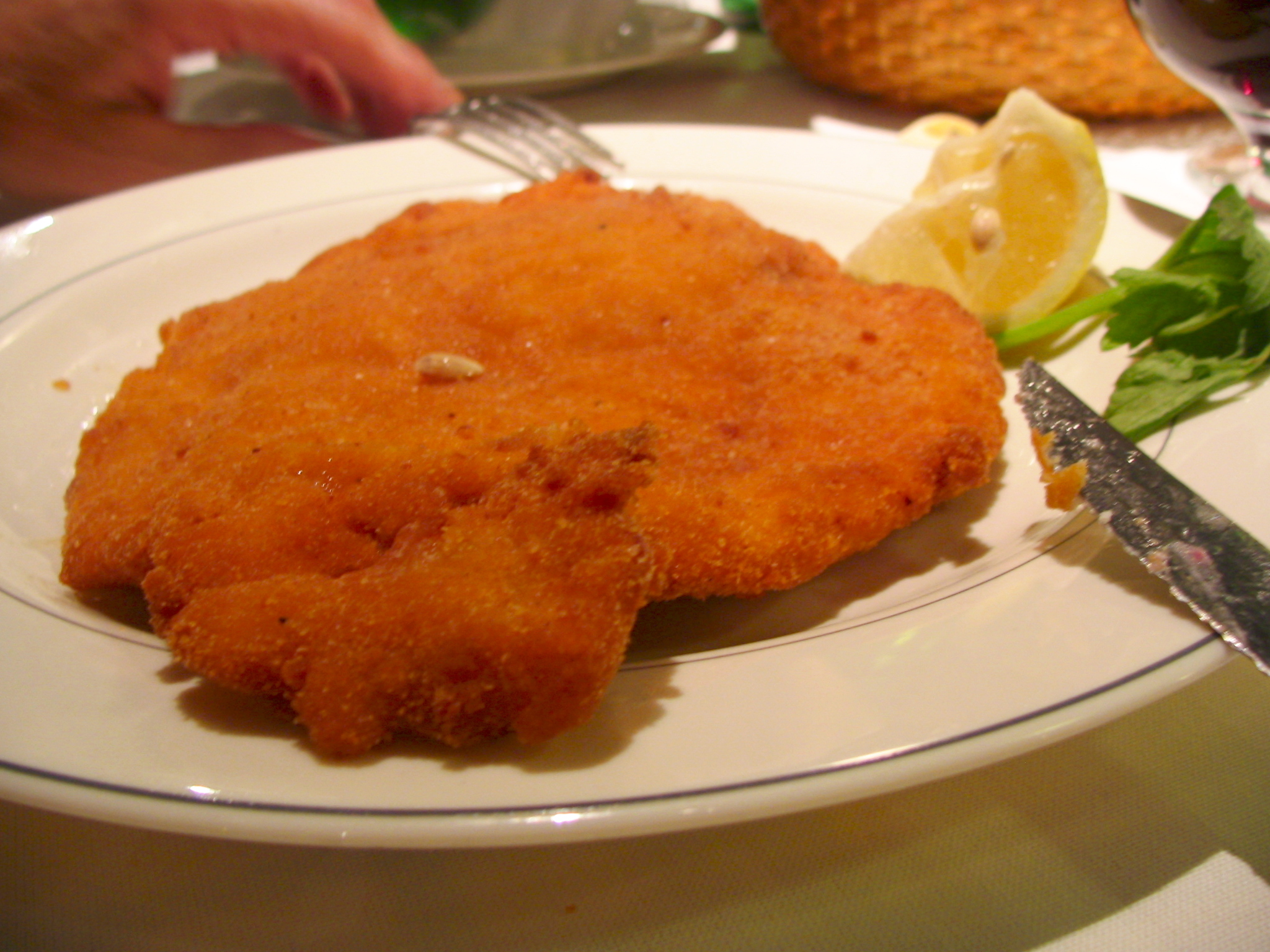
Milanesa

Breading consists of three successive steps that its order defines mostly the character of the milanesa, most of Montevideo's bars and old style restaurants make breading starting with egg so that the latest dip is also egg, this method generated by galician and Spanish barists leaves a coat of egg that turns into a film at frying, it is a curious variation that is often served on those restaurants because the main breading has inverse order and is the type of milanesa that is served everywhere else including homemade milanesas.

Also milanesas are sold on butcher shops on every step previous to frying: sliced, tendered or breaded and ready to fry.

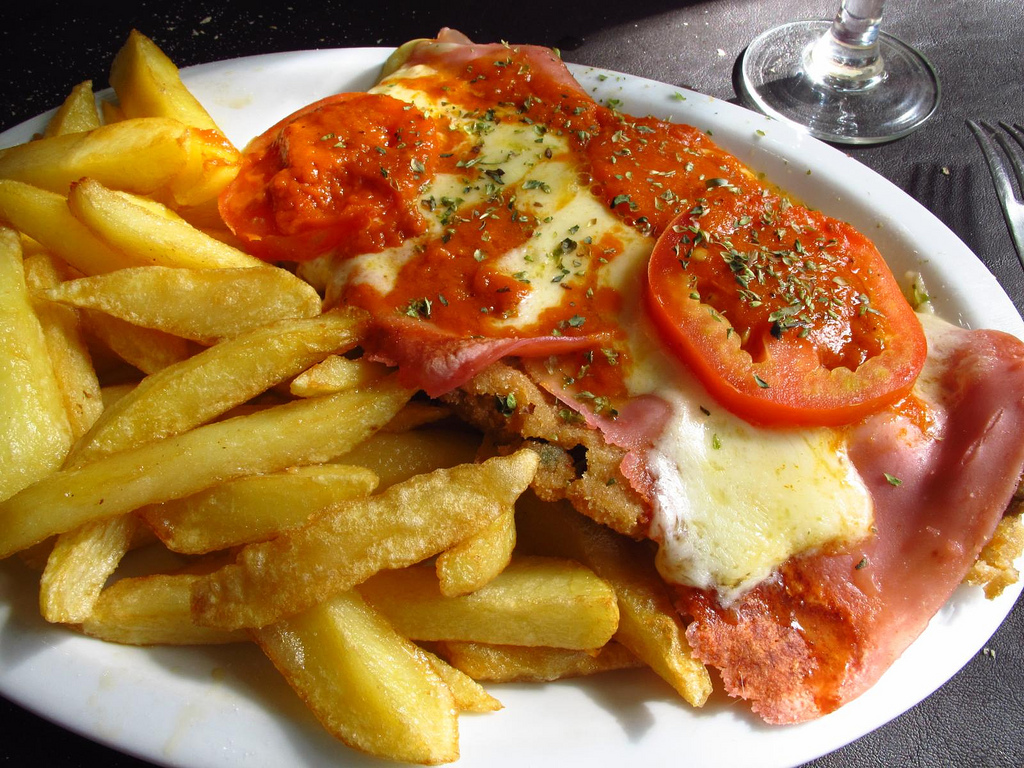
Milanesa a la napolitana does not come from Naples.

A typical dish of milanesa is sided with fried eggs (or "a caballo" -horse riding- when egg garn besides siding), french fries or salad, The way that milanesa is served determinates the name of the dish that can be served "a caballo" or "a la napolitana" (Naples style) or "al pan" (milanesa sandwich).

A milanesa a la napolitana, not original from Naples, consists of a milanesa garnished with tomato sauce, ham and mozzarella cheese slices (on that order) that is finely grated.

Milanesa al pan consists of a sandwich made with milanesa, felipe bread (a type of bread roll), tomato slices, lettuce, mayonnaise, bacon, ham, cheese and olives, when a milanesa al pan is mayor in size it is cut in half and called milanesa en dos panes (double bread), home made and street versions of this dish are called refuerzo de milanesa and it differs in that it is made with baguette besides felipe bread.

=== Postas de pescado a la marinera ===
Often served on portuary sides of the country, pescado a la marinera battered fish fry that it is commonly served sided with lemon slices.

Battering is made from beer (preferably from brand Patricia), flour and salt.

=== Panchos ===
Hot dogs are referred to as panchos, coming in two sizes: cortos (short ones) and largos (longer ones).

La Pasiva is a restaurant chain in Uruguay that specializes in serving panchos and with time, was renowned by its La Pasiva mustard sauce for panchos that comes among every pancho order and also serves local specialities as panchos con panceta (panchos with bacon) and panchos porteños.

- Panchos con panceta. Grilled frankfurter that is previously wrapped on a spiral with sliced bacon and served on bread.
- Panchos porteños. frankfurter wrapped with mozzarella cheese and served on bread.

=== Croquetas ===
Croquetas are croquettes made with potato and ham, rice and ham, béchamel and ham.

=== Empanadas ===
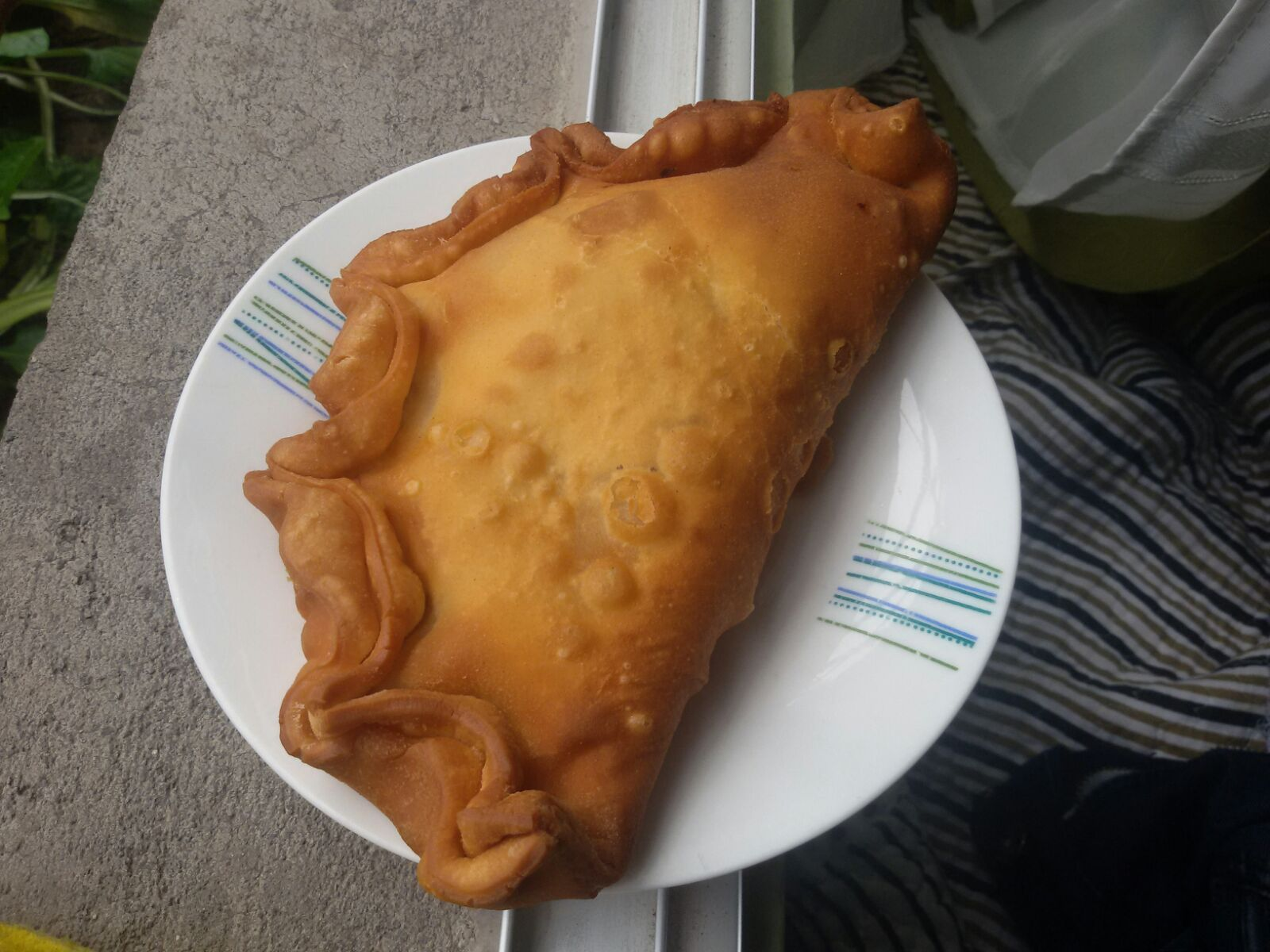
Empanada de pino frita

Empanadas are a kind of pastry that originated in Spain. In Uruguay, empanadas are more commonly baked and usually include a filling of choice. Empanadas de carne are filled with ground meat, chopped boiled eggs, garlic and onions, Empanadas de carne may also be "dulces" (sweet, filled with raisins) or "saladas" (salty, filled with olives). Empanadas de pollo are made with ground poultry meat. Empanadas de jamon y choclo or humitas are filled with ham and corn. Empanadas de queso y cebolla are filled with onion and cheese. Empandas de dulce, or empanadas de membrillo are filled with quince cheese.

Empanadas are not to be confused with pasteles, a similar baked good.

=== Buñuelos ===
Buñuelos are fried dough balls of different types, the most common one are buñuelos de acelga, buñuelos de sesos (doughs that contains brain), buñuelos de manzana (apple dough) and buñuelos de banana (banana dough).

Sweet buñuelos are served powdered with cane sugar.

== Pizzas, pastas and breads ==
Pizza-like bread and pasta are part of everyday food.

Pizza (locally pronounced pisa or pitsa) has been wholly included in Uruguayan cuisine, and in its Uruguayan form more closely resembles an Italian calzone than it does its Italian ancestor. Typical Uruguayan pizzas include pizza rellena (stuffed pizza), pizza por metro (pizza by the meter), and pizza a la parrilla (grilled pizza). While Uruguayan pizza derives from Neapolitan cuisine, the Uruguayan fugaza (fugazza) comes from the focaccia xeneise (Genoan), but in any case its preparation is different from its Italian counterpart, and the addition of cheese to make the dish (fugaza con queso or fugazzeta) started in Argentina or Uruguay.

Sliced pizza is often served along with fainá, made with chickpea flour and baked like pizza. For example, it is common for pasta to be eaten with white bread ("French bread"), which is unusual in Italy. This can be explained by the low cost of bread, and that Uruguayan pasta tends to come together with a large amount of tuco sauce (Italian: suco - juice), and accompanied by estofado (stew). Less commonly, pastas are eaten with a sauce of pesto, a green sauce made with basil, or salsa blanca (Béchamel sauce). During the 20th century, people in pizzerias in Montevideo commonly ordered a "combo" of moscato, which is a large glass of a sweet wine called (muscat), plus two stacked pieces (the lower one being pizza and the upper one fainá). Despite both pizza and faina being Italian in origin, they are never served together in Italy.

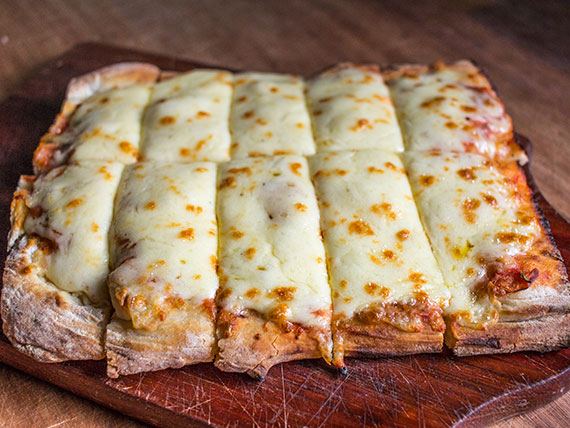
Typical Muzzarella Pizza

=== Pizza ===
Uruguayan style pizza, usually rectangular in shape, has a thicker crust and this rising higher than the usual Neapolitan pizza. It is commonly sliced squared, resembling pizza al taglio or Sicilian pizza. Pizzas with an even thicker crust are referred to as "pizza de cumpleaños" (birthday party pizzas) as it is common to serve to guests on such occasions.

Pizza can come with a lot of ingredients, but most common are pizza (without cheese nor topings) and pizza-muzzarella.

=== Fainá ===
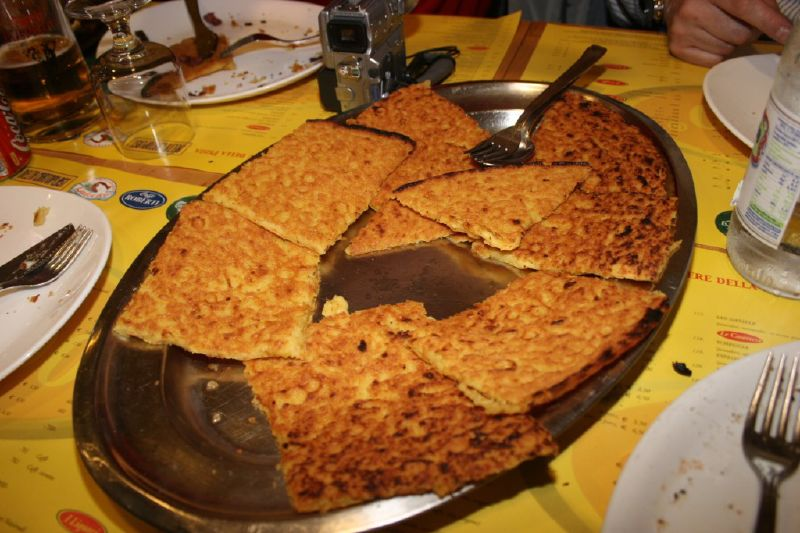

Fainás are often served in pizza bars and restaurants throughout the country.

It consists of a thin, round chickpea flour baked crepe paste than can be ordered as "fainá de orilla" (fainá from the border) when is the thinnest part of the border. that is desired or "fainá del medio" (faina from the middle) when it is referred to the taller middle part of a fainá.

Unlike the common use in Italy that fainá is peppered on the plate by the crust, Uruguayan use implies peppering on the plate with white chopped pepper by the other side.

When fainá is served upside a pizza it is called "pizza a caballo" that may be translated as horse-riding pizza.

=== Figazza ===
A figazza is a pizza bread not containing tomato sauce, topped with onions and often also muzzarella. It is probably descended from the Genoese focaccia (where it is known as fügàssa), and it is also consumed in Argentina under the name fugazzeta.

Typical ingredients of a figazza are onions, peppers, and olives.

=== Lahmajun ===
Lahmajun (locally known as "lehmeyún") was brought by Armenian immigrants. Nowadays it is very popular, found at several small restaurants and pizzerias.

=== Fideos con tuco ===
Tuco is an Uruguayan tomato sauce made with chopped meat, tomato sauce, onions, oreganon and garlic, fideos meaning noodles.

Tuco can be served with any pasta, fresh or dry, but most common are tallarines con tuco (spaghetti with tuco), ñoquis con tuco (gnocchi), moñitas con tuco (farfalle), raviolis con tuco (ravioli), and canelones con tuco (cannelloni).

Canelones con tuco are covered with bechamel and later covered with tuco.

=== Fideos con estofado ===
Estofado and tuco are interchangeable for any of the mentioned noodles though estofado can serve also as a dish by itself when served alone or with potatoes.

Estofado is made by cooking meat pieces in tomato sauce by long coctions.

=== Ñoquis ===
Gnocchi, or ñoquis of the 29th is a tradition of having gnocchi every 29, brought in by the immigration from Veneto, the tradition of Saint Pantaleo, who had many miracles attributed to him, is said to honor him.

Families and friends gather on the 29th to eat gnocchi, the tradition is that everyone at the table puts money under the plate for good fortune.

=== Capeletis a la Caruso ===
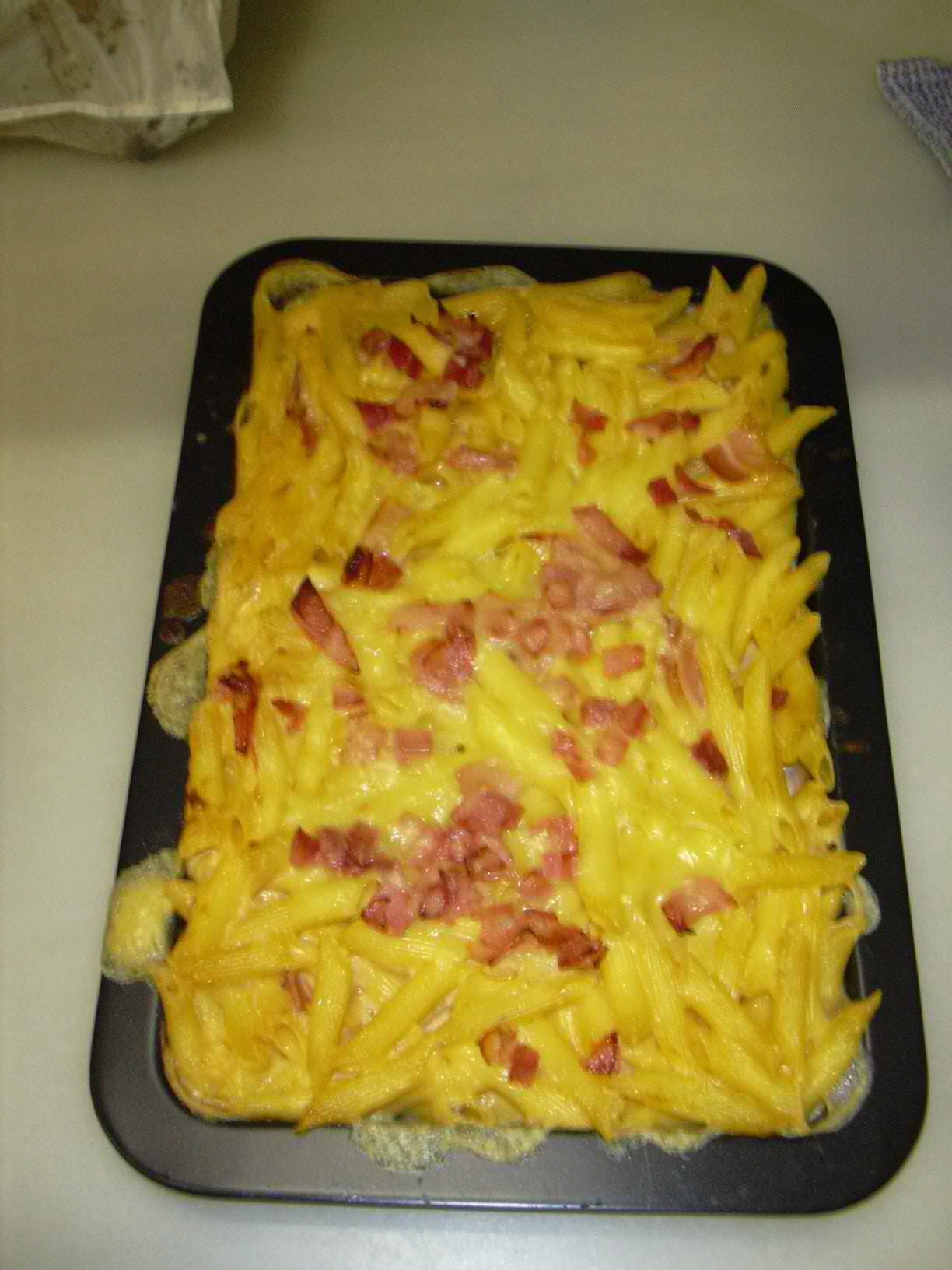

Caruso sauce was invented by chef Raymundo Monti and takes its name from the famous tenor Enrico Caruso. It is a warm sauce that is made of cream, sliced onions, ham, cheese, nuts, and mushrooms and is served with cappelletti.

=== Breads ===
- Pan de chicharrones

Literally meaning rind bread, also rosca de chicharrones, is a leavened bread made of cow lard and added with small rinds made of cow fat, commonly found on local bakeries among with sweet variations without rinds such as rosca de membrillo, (quince (cheese-filled) bread) and rosca de dulce de leche (dulce de leche (filled) bread).

- Flauta

Pan flauta (flute bread) is an elongated bread that is a variant of baguette.

- Tortuga

Pan tortuga it is a small round-shaped bread with a soft crust, thus its name tortuga (Spanish for turtle).

- Felipe

Felipe is a hard-crusted small bread.

- Porteño

Porteño is called after the eponym of the inhabitants of Buenos Aires and is similar to Felipe but with a smaller crumb.

- Marsellés

Marsellés is named after the city of Marseille and resembles a pair of twin Vienna bread with harder crust and covered with maize flour.

- Pan de sándwich

Pan de sándwich is a soft crumb mold bread specially made for making sandwiches.

== Sandwiches ==
There is a wide variety of sandwiches in Uruguay which are locally classified into two types called refuerzo (reinforcement) and sándwich (sandwich) respectively. Sandwiches in Rio de la Plata are particular and different of those from other parts of the world because of the bread with which are made that is pan de sándwich, this type of sandwiches are simply called sándwiches and are commonly sold on local bakeries. Also note that the Spanish distinction between refuerzo and sándwich which is also present in Mexico with torta and sándwich, which differentiates common bread sandwich from others similar to the British train sandwich, is not so pronounced on the Argentinian dialect where difference is simply made by adding de miga (crumby) to the latter. Notable types of refuerzos are chivito, choripán and milanesa al pan.

=== Chivito ===
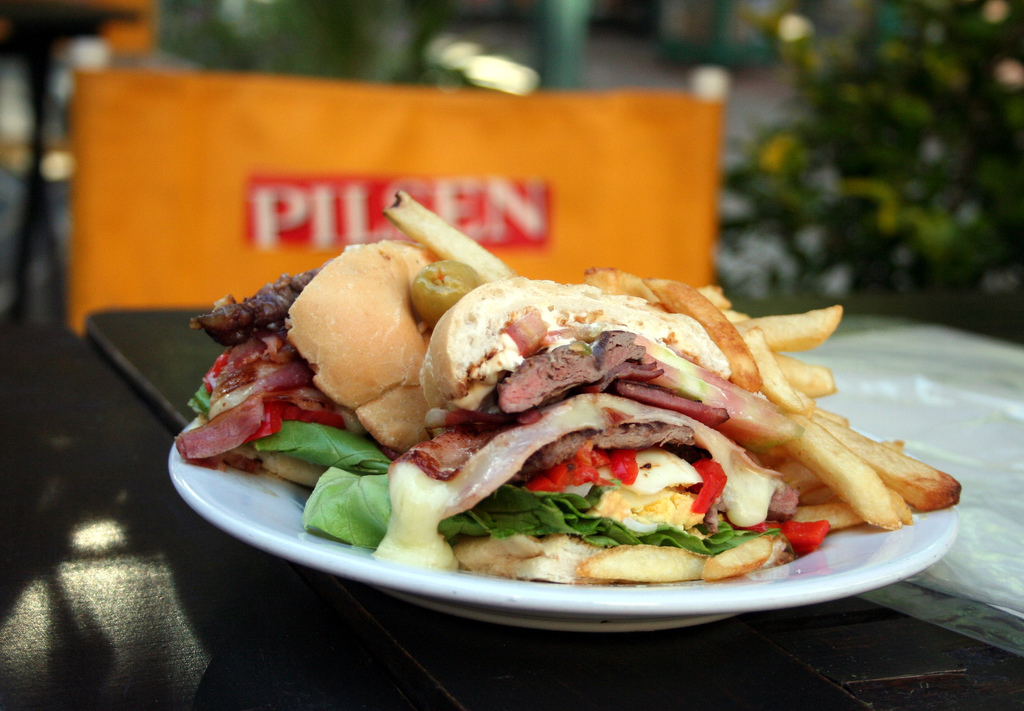
A complete chivito

Chivito meaning literally small goat is a popular type of sandwich originated in Uruguay, its name comes from an unaccomplished desire from a client that literally wanted a beef of small goat or a chivito, being that goat is not consumed in Uruguay client had to be satisfied anyway with this now popular dish.

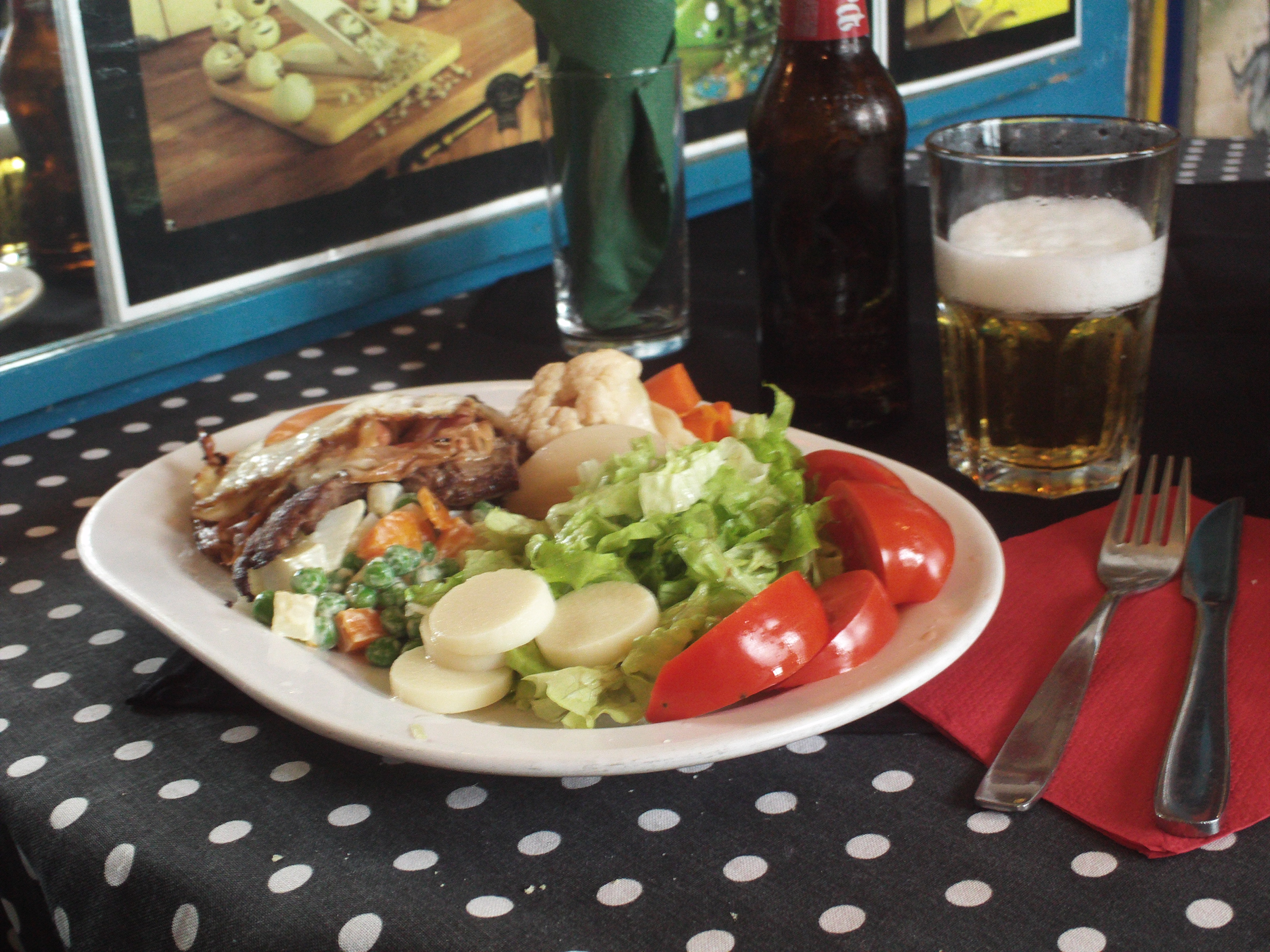
Platted chivito with Russian salad, ensalada criolla and heart of palm

. Hence a thin slice of filet mignon substituted the beef of small goat, nowadays it is uncertain if bacon, mozzarella, ham, onion, Hard-cooked eggs, tomato slices, mayonnaise, olives and bread really complement the goat flavour.

Variants from chivito are, as milanesa en dos panes, chivito en dos panes, chivito canadiense (added with Canadian bacon), chivito canadiense al plato and chivito al plato (platted chivito).

A complete chivito is served with french fries and when is dished is also sided with ensalada rusa and ensalada criolla.

=== Choripán ===
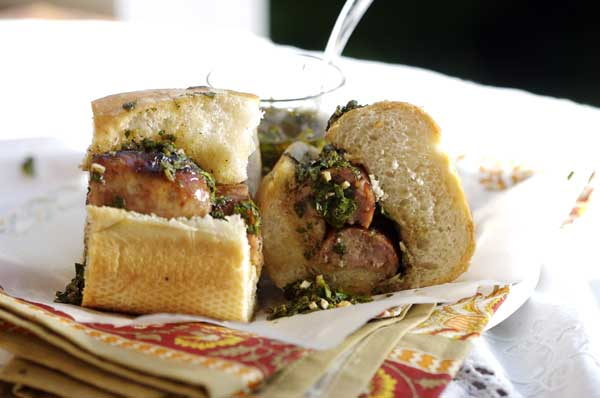

Choripán, Spanish portmanteau for sausage (chorizo) and bread (pan) also called chorizo al pan (sausage on bread), is a sandwich made with barbecued chorizo (that is sliced in half to fit), mayonnaise, ketchup, tomato, lettuce, onions, etc.

=== Sándwich Olímpico ===
Sándwich Olímpico (Olympic sandwich) is a very popular sandwich in Uruguay made with three slices of pan de sándwich filled with ham, cheese, olives tomato and lettuce.

=== Sándwich caliente ===
Sándwich caliente (hot sandwich) or "tostado" (toasted) as it is called in Argentina is a variant of the croqué monsieur made with two slices of pan de sánguche filled ham and cheese and toasted.

=== Jesuitas ===
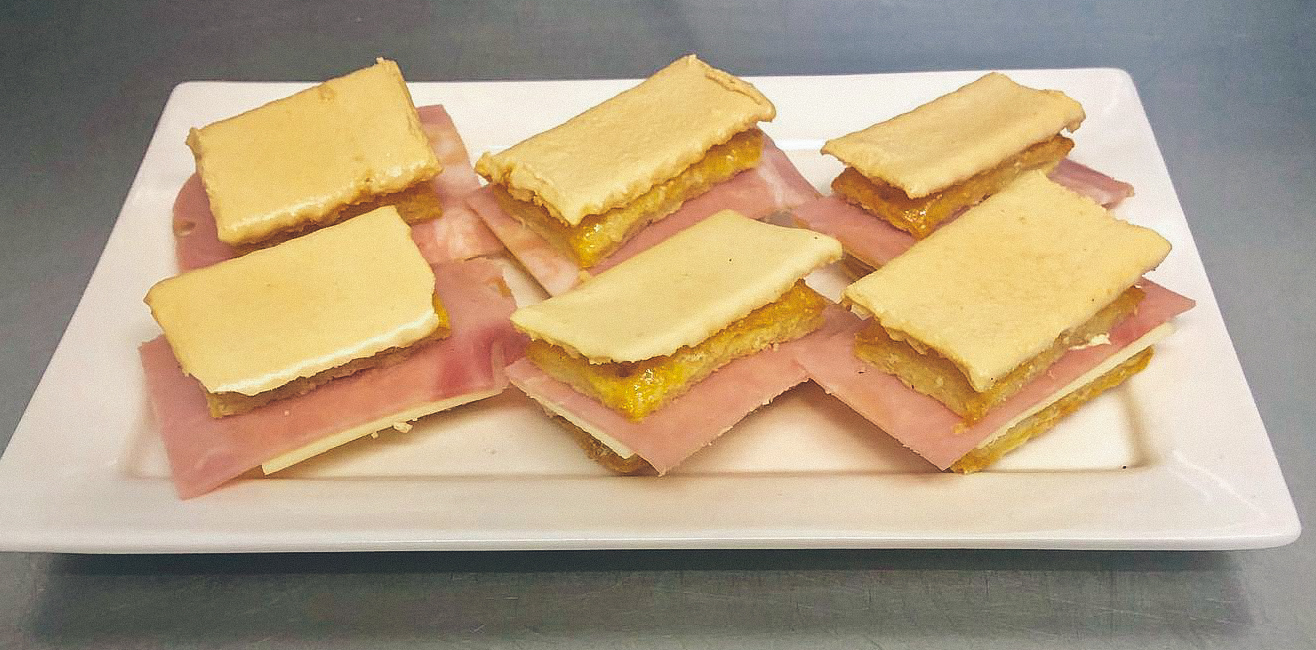
Jesuitas

Jesuitas are made with two layers of puff pastry filled with ham and cheese and covered with meringue icing. This is a sweet and salty taste. The same sandwich in Argentina is known as a fosforito.

== Confectioneries for mate ==
Uruguayan food often comes with fresh bread; bizcochos and tortas fritas are a must for drinking mate, the national drink.

=== Tortas fritas ===
Tortas fritas (fried cakes) are a simple pastry, typical from Uruguay and Argentina and which has many variants along South America. The recipe for the sopaipilla, from which it descends, is argued to be from what is now Germany but they were introduced to Spain by the Arabs at the times of the invasion.

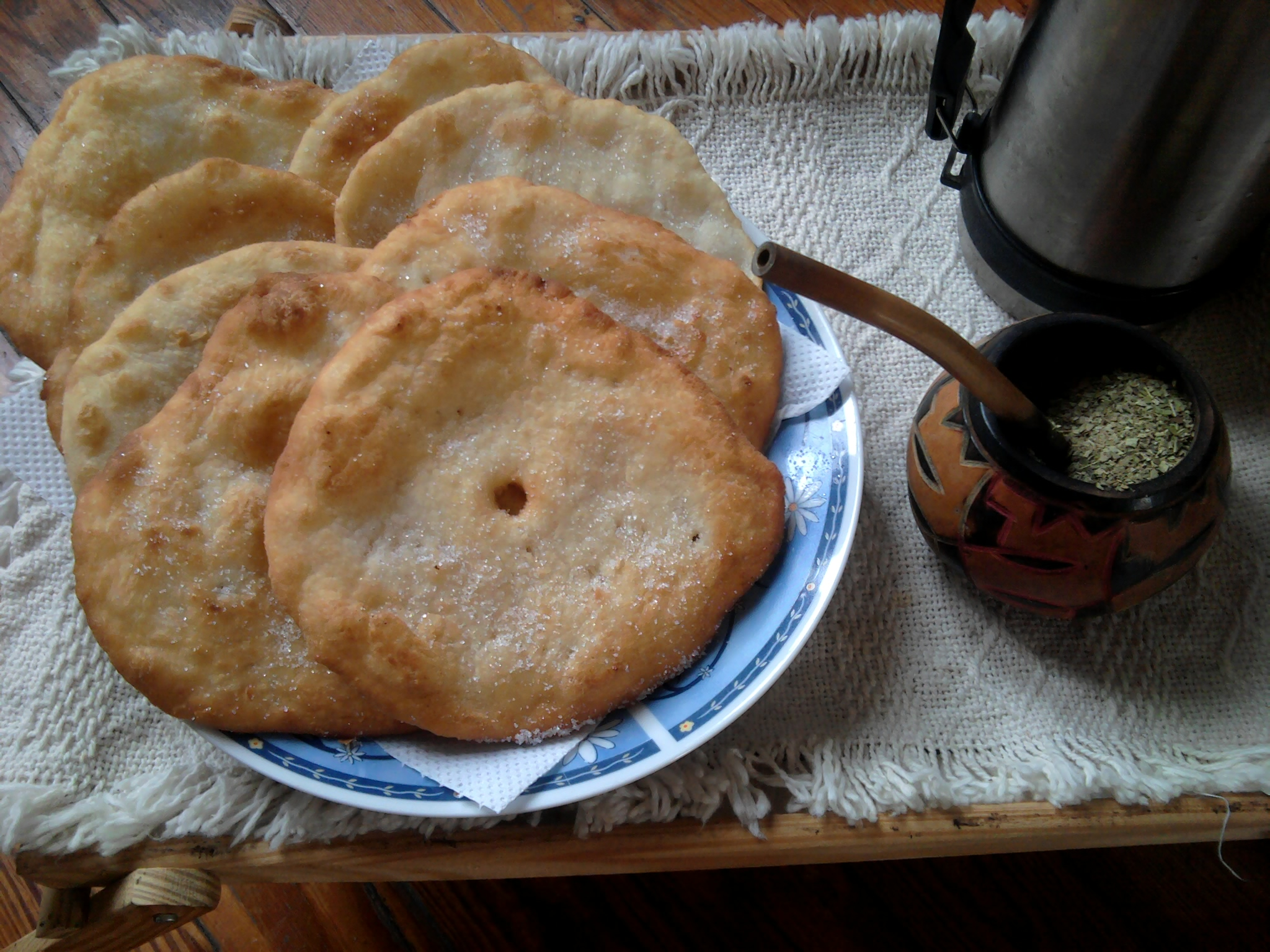

Specifically Tortas fritas are leavened fried thin round pieces of bread but the aspects that describe them best is the flourishing with sugar, its distinctive hole in the center and the use of cow fat, both for frying and for making the batter.

- Within Uruguayan folklore is stated that tortas fritas are better if made and eaten on rainy days.

=== Bizcochos ===
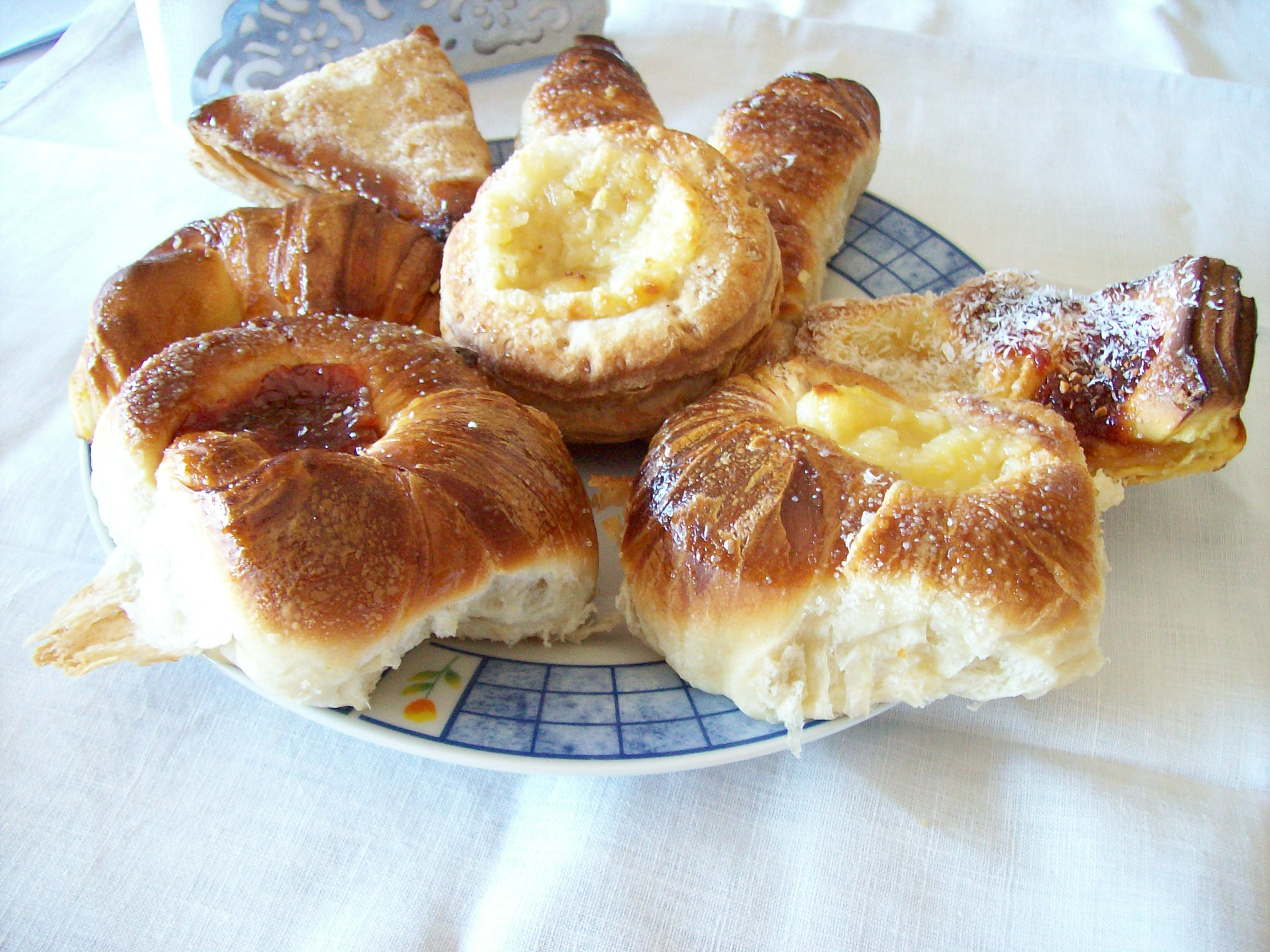
Assorted bizcochos, a buttery flaky pastry

Uruguayan bizcochos are small pastries different from the Spaniard sponge cake of the same name that in Uruguay is called bizcochuelo.

Bizcochos are consumed with mate, coffee and tea, they are the more common pastry of Uruguay, and commonly sold on local bakeries.

Bizcochos come in various kinds, like corazanes, margaritas and pan con grasa.

=== Pasteles ===
Pasteles (pastries) are triangular-shaped empanadas that are made from a batter identical to such of tortas fritas with the addition of being puffed using cow fat. As tortas fritas they are also flourished with sugar after frying. Pasteles are filled only with quince jam or dulce de leche.

- Tortas fritas and pasteles are commonly sold on streets.

=== Alfajores ===
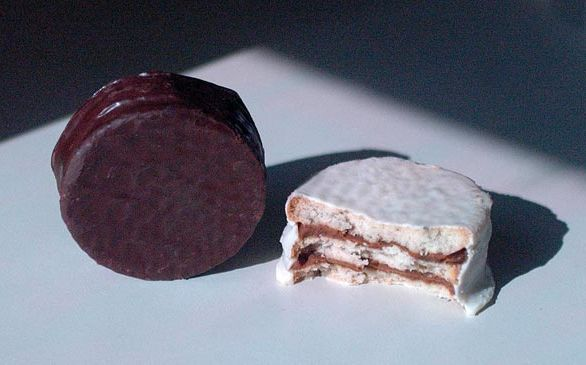
Triple layered alfajores

Alfajores consist of two round sweet spongy doughs poured together filled with dulce de leche and covered onto two variants: ″chocolate″ and ″nieve″ (snow).

Nieve variant is called due to its white snowy aspect conferred by the meringue covering.

- Yo-yo: Layered pastry filled with Dulce de Leche and coated with chocolate on the upper half. It is shaped like a yo-yo.

== Desserts ==
Popular sweets are membrillo quince jam and dulce de leche, which is made from caramelized milk. A sweet paste, dulce de leche, is used to fill cookies, cakes, pancakes, milhojas, and alfajores. The alfajores are shortbread cookies sandwiched together with dulce de leche or a fruit paste. Dulce de leche is used also in flan con dulce de leche.

=== Cakes ===
- [[Chajá (postre)]]: a dessert with meringue, sponge cake, "Chajá" cream and peaches. It is created by a well known firm in the city of Paysandú.
- Isla Flotante, made with egg white and sugar, and served with zabaione.
- Massini: Made of two layers of pionono (a thin sponge cake), filled with whipped cream and topped with caramelized sabayon.
- Bizcocho borracho: a dessert from Spanish origin, it is a spongy dough dipped with a syrup made of liquor

=== Confectioneries ===
- Garrapiñadas: a very popular treat, made with peanuts covered with cocoa, vanilla and sugar, resembling whole-nut pralines. It is sold in little bags in the downtown streets.
- Damasquitos: Jelly apricot candies, a delicacy from the city of Minas.
- Yemas acarameladas: Egg candy made mainly with egg yolks, vanilla, and sugar. It has a spherical shape of about one-inch diameter and covered with a thin layer of hard, transparent, caramelized sugar coating.
- Zapallo en almíbar: Squash in syrup.

=== Cookies ===
- Churros: came from Spain, and are just like those, except some have fillings, like custard cream or Dulce de Leche.

=== Custards and ice creams ===
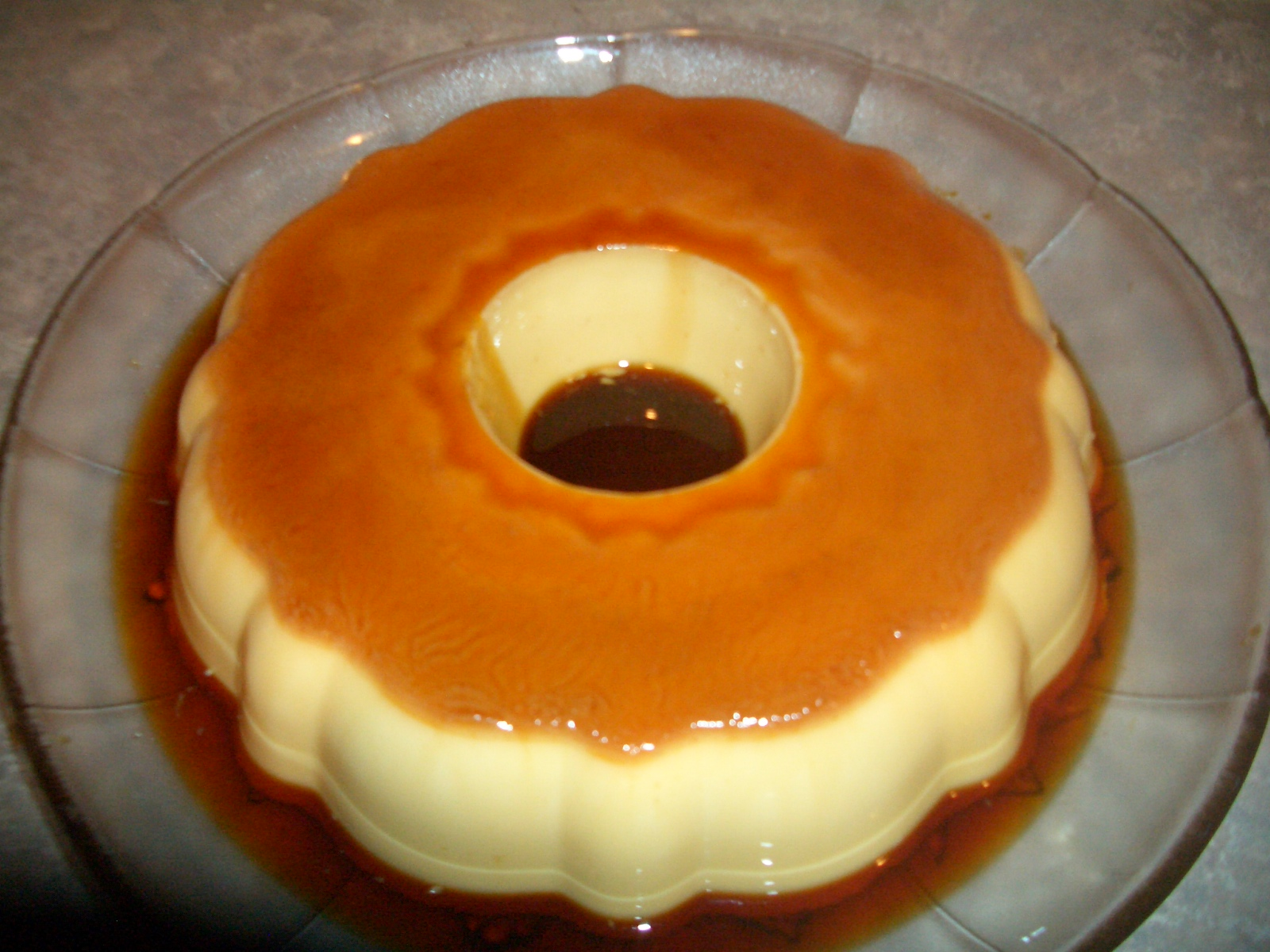
Homemade oven-steamed crème caramel

- Dulce de leche: a sweet treat made of milk and sugar. It is used in many Uruguayan desserts.
- Dulce de membrillo: a sweet quince jelly-like preserve.
- Budín inglés: in English, 'English pudding'. A pudding with fruits and nuts, very popular on Christmas and New Year's Eve.
- Flan: a kind of rich custard dessert with a layer of soft caramel on top. as opposed to crème brûlée.
- Martín Fierro: a slice of cheese and a slice of quince preserve (dulce de membrillo).
- Ricardito: Also as popular, this is a cream-filled treat, covered with chocolate on a waffle base. It has different variants and it is sold in most kiosks in individual boxes.

=== Pastries ===
- Pastafrola: pie made of quince paste (dulce de membrillo).

== See also ==
- Cuisine of Argentina
- Cuisine of Montevideo
- List of Uruguayan cheeses
