= Fosforito (disambiguation) =

Fosforito is a Spanish flamenco singer born in 1932. It may also refer to:

- Fosforito (sandwich), a popular sandwich in Argentina, known as a Jesuita in Uruguay
- Francisco Lema Ullet (1869–1940), a Spanish flamenco singer known as Fosforito or Fosforito el Viejo
