= Cuisine of Montevideo =

Culinary traditions of Montevideo, Uruguay

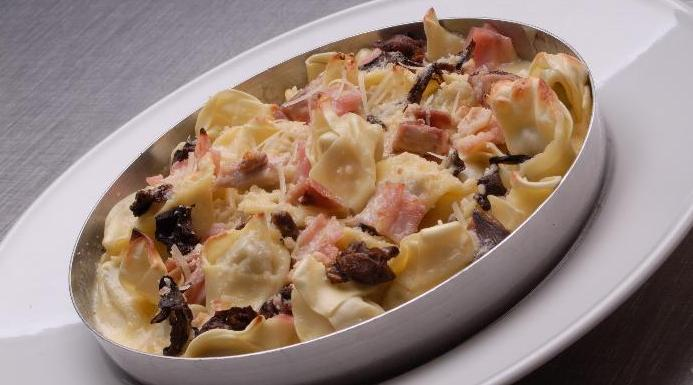
Pasta with Caruso sauce, which was created in Montevideo in the 1950s.

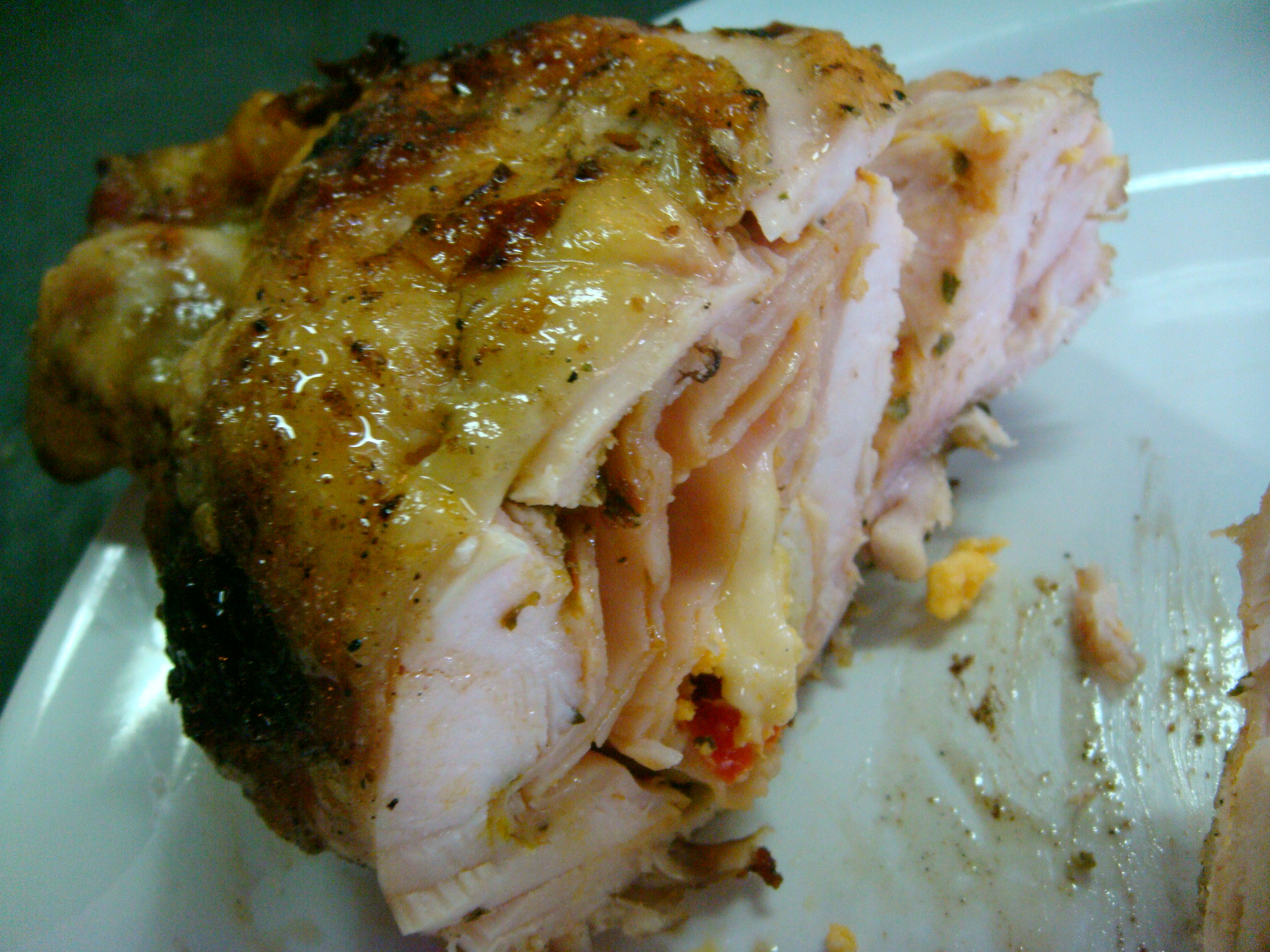
Chicken served in a restaurant in Montevideo

The cuisine of Montevideo encompasses various aspects of the city’s culinary culture. It largely reflects that of the rest of Uruguay and is strongly influenced by Italian and Spanish cuisines, owing to significant immigration from those countries since the 19th century.

Lonely Planet has described the Montevideo culinary scene as "just starting to get exciting" with a variety of restaurants, expanding from traditional Uruguayan cuisine to Japanese and Middle Eastern cuisine.

== Cuisine ==
A torta frita is a pan-fried cake consumed in Montevideo and throughout Uruguay. It is usually circular, with a small cut in the centre for even cooking, and is made from wheat flour, yeast, water and sugar or salt. Beef is very important in Uruguayan cuisine and an essential part of many dishes. Many of the restaurants serve beef steaks, pork or chicken dishes. Given that Montevideo is a coastal city, it has a plentiful supply of fresh fish. Some restaurants, specialise in fresh seafood.

== Mercado del Puerto ==
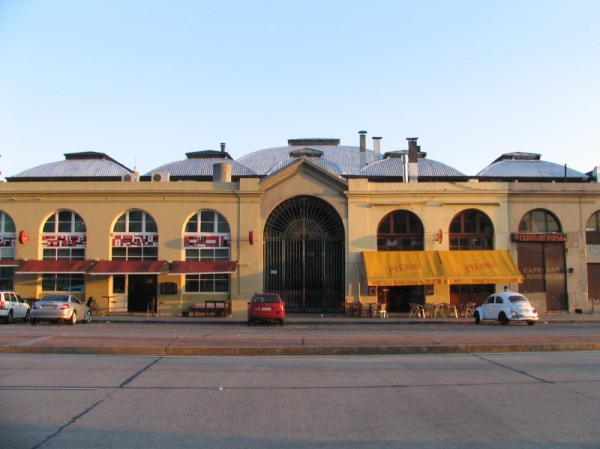
Mercado del Puerto

The historic centre of traditional food and beverage in Montevideo is the Mercado del Puerto ("Port Market"), which contains restaurants and cafes catering to international visitors. The La Palenque restaurant serves Uruguayan and Spanish cuisine with a variety of lamb, pork and cold meats dishes with vegetables, paella, rice and shellfish. Additionally, the market is host to various cultural events on Saturdays.

The Mercado del Puerto is the city's most famous area for parrillas (barbecues). The open-aired building which houses the market was built in 1868. While originally a venue for fresh produce, it is now filled with parrillas. The structure was built in the style of a nineteenth-century British Railway station. It is listed among "The Best Markets" in South America by Frommer's.

== Restaurants ==
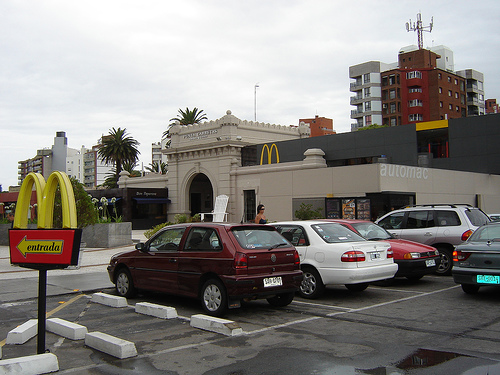
A McDonald's in Montevideo

Montevideo has a variety of restaurants, from traditional Uruguayan cuisine to Japanese cuisine such as sushi. Western fast-food chains such as McDonald's, and Burger King are present in the city.

== Bars and pubs ==
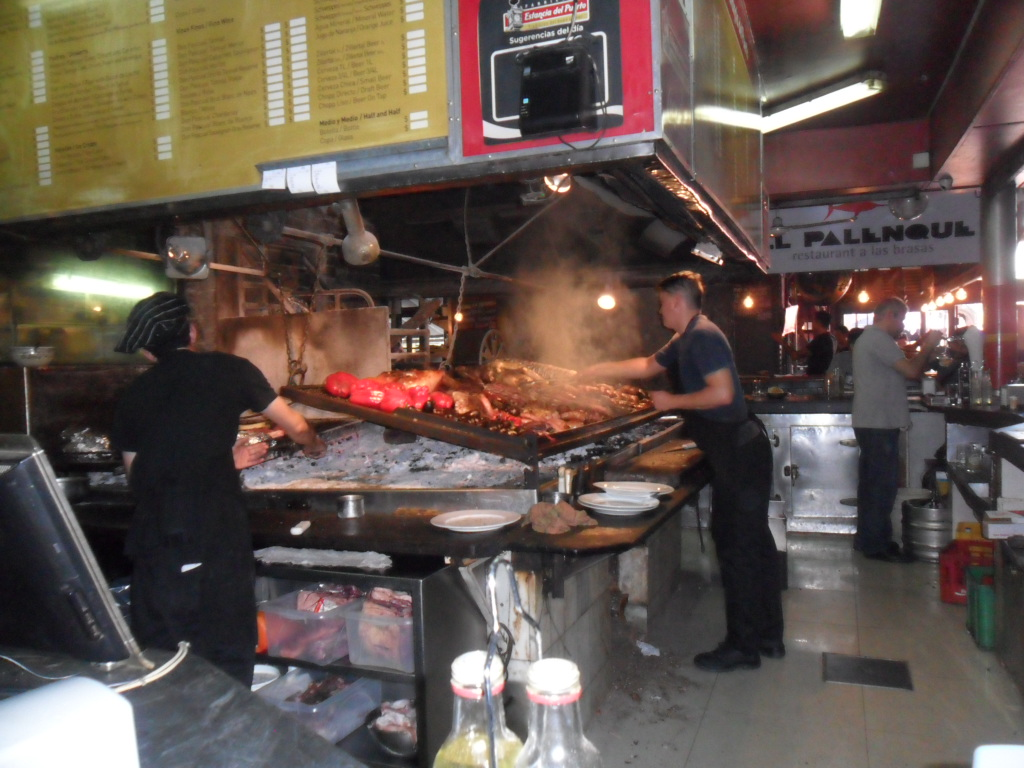
Line cooks grilling sausages and other meats in a market near the port of Montevideo, Uruguay.

Many of the notable bars in the city are located in the barrio of Pocitos near the sea.

Many bars and pubs are located inside community markets. Customers at markets may sit at bars to order sausages, offal, asado, and other meats that are being grilled right in front of them. Meats, especially cheap cuts of beef and pork such as sausages and organs, are a large part of the ordinary diet in Montevideo. The various meats are served with simple side dishes such as crusty bread, tapenades, fried potatoes, and tapas. During lunch, local lager beer is the most common choice of accompaniment, although soft drinks such as colas are widely available. In addition to having bars and pubs, markets in Montevideo also sell fresh produce, mate, coffee, kitchenware, and other basic consumer goods.

== Former world record barbecue ==
On 13 April 2008, 12,500 cooks in Montevideo together grilled 12 tonnes (26,500 lb) of beef, setting a new Guinness world record. The event required a grill nearly 1.6 km (1 mi) long and 6 tonnes of charcoal. The barbecue surpassed the previous record of 8 tonnes, which was set by Mexico in 2006. Montevideo's record held until March 2011, when 13.713 tonnes (30,232 lb) of beef were grilled in General Pico in Argentina.
