= Jésuite =

French puff pastry snack

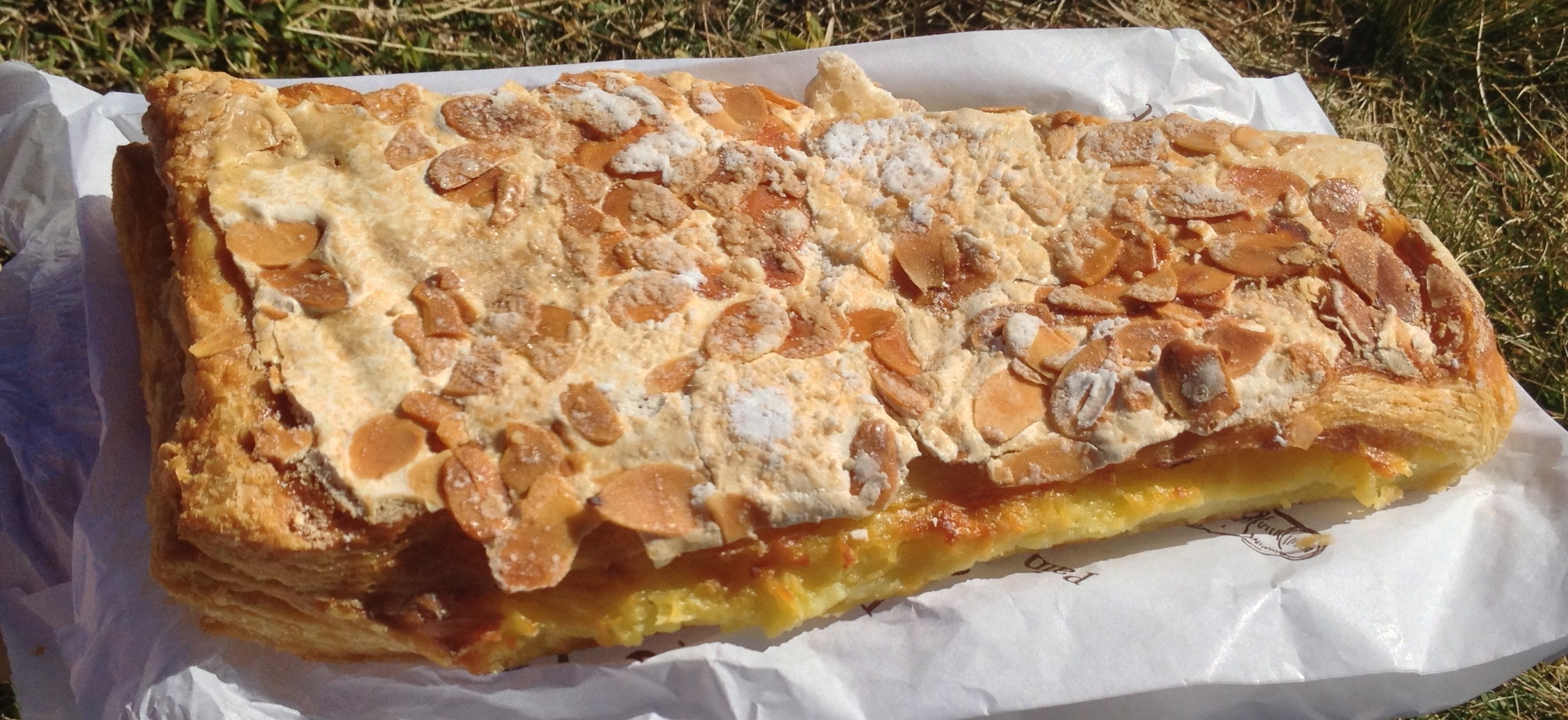
- Jésuite
- Type: Pastry
- Place of origin: Bordeaux
- Main ingredients: Puff pastry, frangipane cream, slivered almonds, powdered sugar
- Similar dishes: galette des rois; tarte conversation

A Jésuite (French pronunciation: [ʒezɥit]) is a triangular, Puff pastry filled with frangipane cream and topped with sliced almonds and powdered sugar. The pastry originated in France and the name refers to the triangular shape of a Jesuit's hat. A similarly-named sweet pastry known in Portugal and Spain, the jesuíta, consists of puff pastry filled with custard. In Germany, Jesuitermützen are a custard-filled pastry traditionally cut into triangles.

A similarly-named Uruguayan dish is the jesuita, a baked ham and cheese sandwich with a puff pastry crust commonly eaten in parts of South America and considered a classic of Argentinian cuisine, where it is known as a fosforito. In Argentina, jesuita is a very popular dish in many provinces. Rectangular in shape, it is made from puff pastry stuffed with ham and cheese, and is covered with a sweet crust.

== See also ==
- List of pastries
- List of almond dishes
