= Conversation tart =

French dessert tart

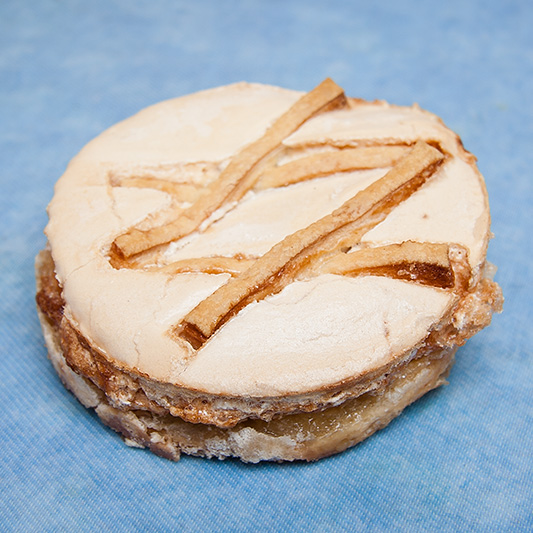
- Type: tart
- Course: dessert
- Place of origin: France
- Associated cuisine: French
- Invented: late 18th century
- Main ingredients: Flour; Sugar; Butter; Almonds; Cream
- Similar dishes: Galette des rois; Jésuite

A conversation tart (French: tarte conversation) is a type of tart made with puff pastry that is filled with frangipane cream and topped with royal icing. The recipe was created in the late 18th century to celebrate the publication of les Conversations d'Émilie by Louise d'Épinay.

== See also ==
- List of almond dishes
- List of pastries
- List of pies, tarts and flans
