= Chajá =

Uruguayan dessert

chajá cake
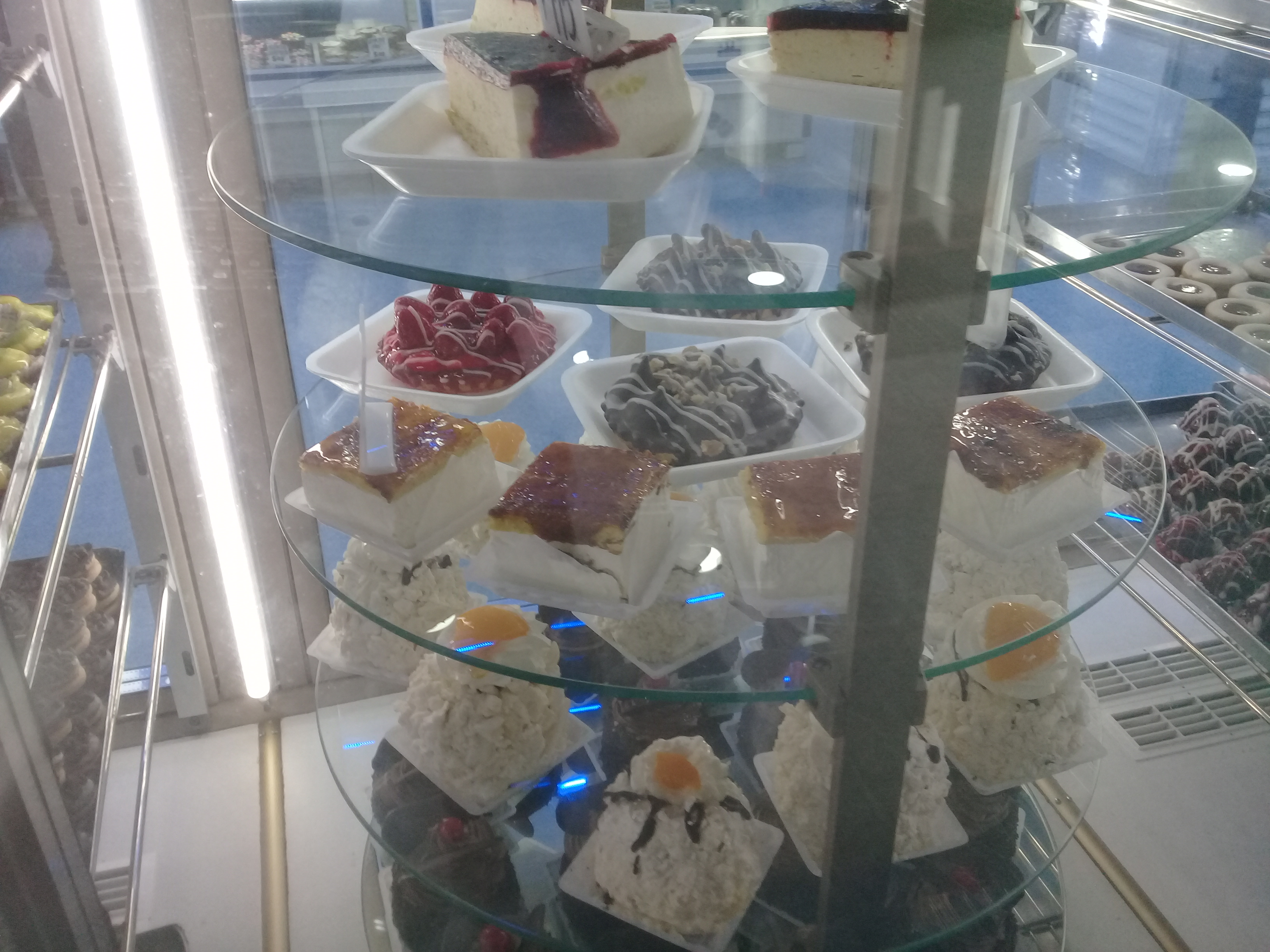
- Confectionery showing chajás on the bottom and masinis (another Uruguayan dessert) on the middle.
- Course: Dessert
- Place of origin: Uruguay
- Region or state: Paysandú
- Serving temperature: cold
- Main ingredients: meringue, sponge cake (bizcochuelo), crema doble, peaches or strawberries

The chajá (Spanish: [tʃaˈxa]) cake, or postre chajá, is a typical dessert in Uruguayan cuisine. It was created on April 27, 1927 by Orlando Castellano, the owner of the Confitería Las Familias in the city of Paysandú. It originated as a semi-industrialized confectionery, and is exported to Argentina, Brazil, Paraguay and United States

This dessert owes its name to the Southern screamer, a bird (locally known as the chajá) native to the central and southern parts of South America.

The main ingredients to this dessert are meringue, sponge cake (bizcochuelo), cream (crema de leche; crema doble) and fruits (typically peaches and strawberries are added). Variations of this dessert can be elaborated on by adding dulce de leche or chocolate.
