= Caruso sauce =

Cream sauce for pasta

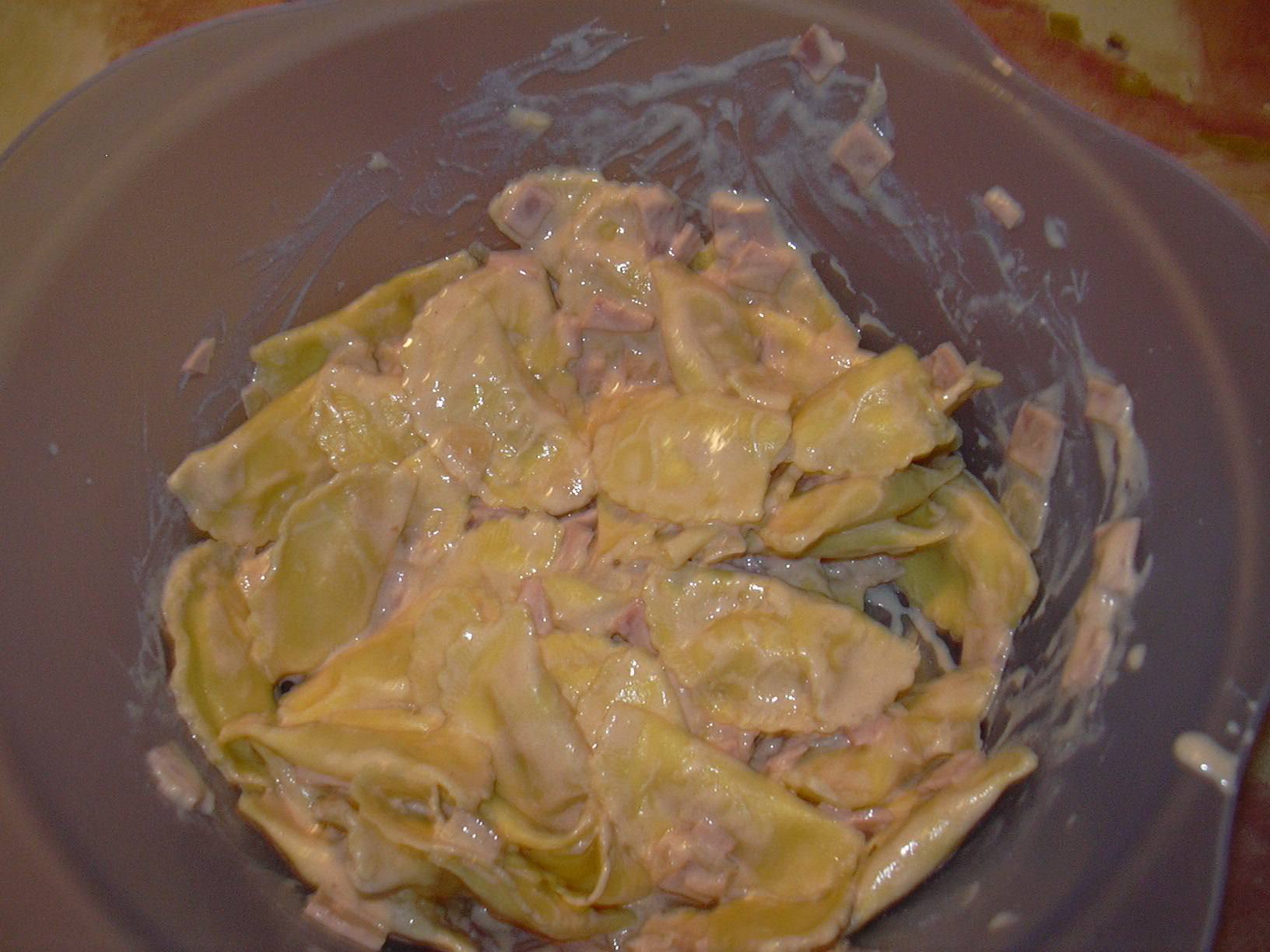
Tortellini with Caruso sauce

Caruso sauce or salsa Caruso is a warm sauce in Uruguayan cuisine made of cream, ham, cheese, beef extract, and mushrooms, and sometimes nuts or onions. A simpler version is a Béchamel sauce with spices, walnuts, and ham. It is served with pasta, typically cappelletti.

A different Caruso sauce, unrelated to the Uruguayan one and also served with pasta, is made of tomato, chicken giblets and mushrooms.

== History ==
Caruso sauce was created in the 1950s in Uruguay by Raymundo Monti of the restaurant Mario y Alberto in Montevideo. Monti wanted to create a new recipe in the style of Italian cuisine. The dish was named in honor of the Neapolitan tenor Enrico Caruso who was popular in South America during his tours of the 1910s.

The sauce was originally considered to be a variant of bechamel but its flavor is distinctly different. Several culinary seminars referred to Caruso sauce as "the new invention", and it gained international culinary recognition. In recent decades, the sauce has been included in the menu of some South American and Western European restaurants, but it is unknown in Italy.

== See also ==
- List of sauces
- Chimichurri
