= Grappamiel =

Uruguayan mixed alcoholic beverage

Grappamiel or Grapamiel is a mixed alcoholic beverage popular in Uruguay containing grappa, spirits obtained from various grains plus honey and water. In agreements with the European Union, the drink is a food protected by geographical indications. The definition is provided by CONSULTA Nº 4.548 of the Uruguay Government.

== Preparation ==
The process includes distillate of the bagasse and lees of grapes and grains which is then mixed with natural honey, water and sugar. Grappamiel contains between 20% and 25% alcohol by volume. The name come from Italian "Grappa" (a distilled liquor) and Miel (honey in spanish, native language from Uruguay).

== Serving ==
It is enjoyed principally in bars served in a classic 25cl copa. Because it is a strong drink, it is popular with Uruguayan street musicians in the winter, and is traditionally drunk before taking the stage in the summer.

During hot weather, it is customary to take it in a tall 30cl glass with plenty of ice cubes.

In the past two decades, some cocktail bars have mixed the drink with a variety of flavors, for example:

- Chocolate
- Coffee
- Lemon
- Mint
- Blueberry
- Peanuts
- Strawberry
- Orange
- Vanilla
