= Chivito (sandwich) =

Beef sandwich from Uruguay

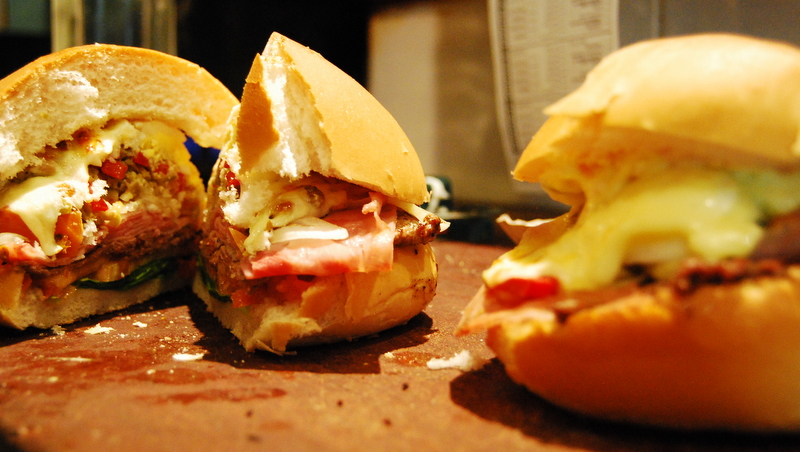
- Type: Sandwich
- Place of origin: Uruguay
- Created by: Antonio Carbonaro
- Main ingredients: Bun, churrasco beef, bacon, fried or hard-boiled eggs, ham, green olives, mozzarella, tomatoes, mustard, mayonnaise

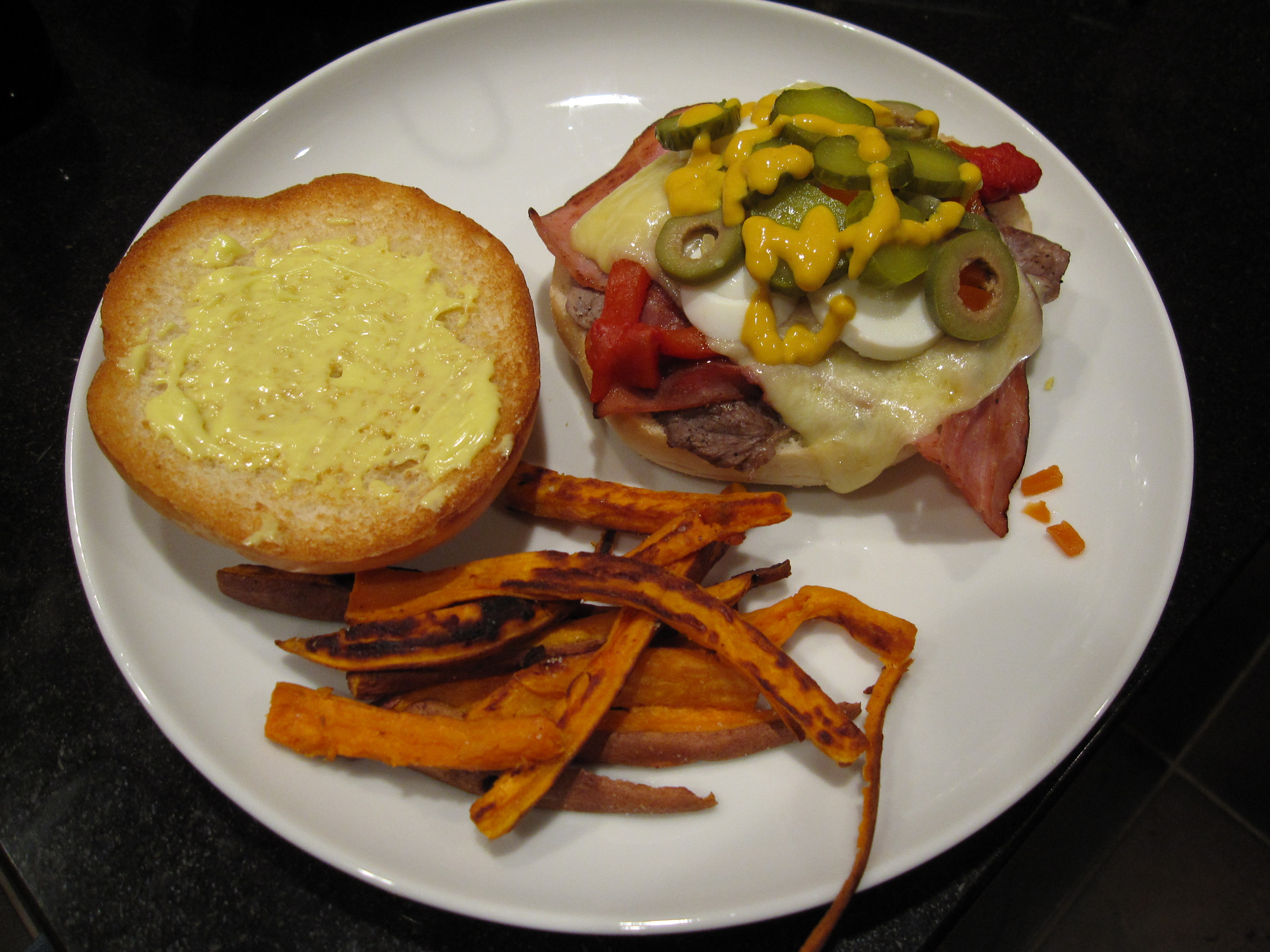
Ingredients in a chivito sandwich

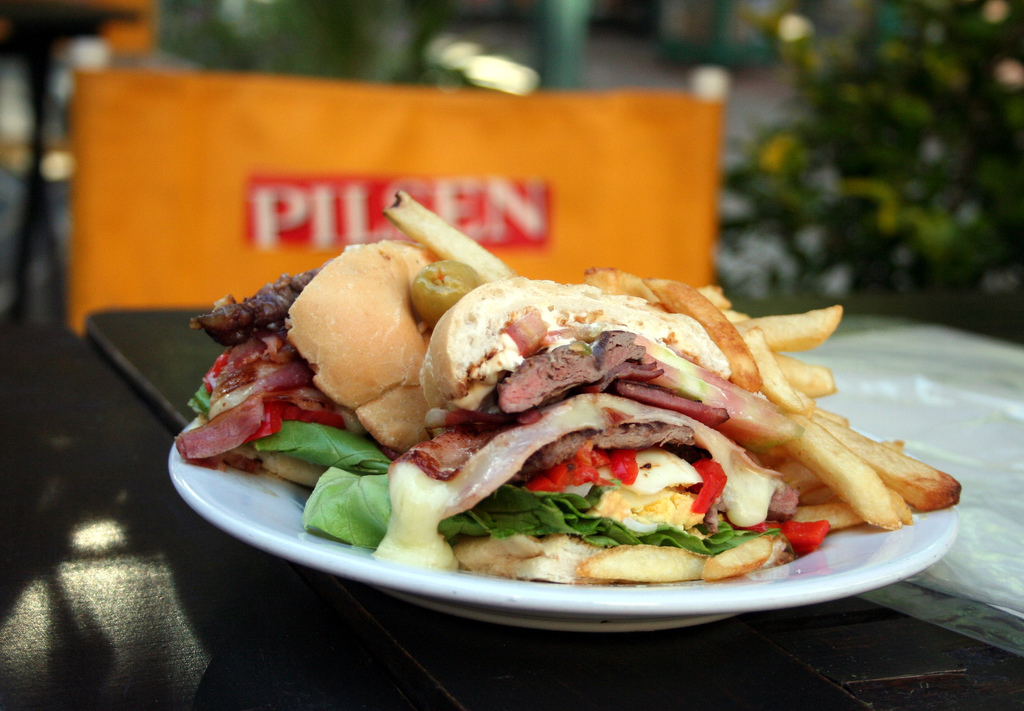
A chivito sandwich with all the trimmings

Chivito is the national dish of Uruguay. It is a sandwich of sliced beefsteak (churrasco), mozzarella, ham, tomatoes, mustard, mayonnaise and black or green olives. A chivito commonly also includes bacon and fried or hard-boiled eggs. It is served in a bun, often accompanied by French-fried potatoes. Other ingredients, such as arugula, green peas, Catalan peppers, caramelized or diced onions, pan-fried or cured red peppers.

== History ==
Chivito is the diminutive of chivo, goat, and means kid (young goat). In neighboring Argentina, chivito, barbecued kid, is a popular asado dish; it is reported that the Uruguayan chivito arose in Punta del Este, Uruguay, at a restaurant called "El Mejillón Bar" in 1946, when a woman from northern Argentina ordered a sandwich of chivito for a hurried, meal-expecting kid. The restaurant owner, Antonio Carbonaro, did not have this meat and used beef fillet steak instead.

== Variations ==
The Canadian chivito (in Spanish chivito canadiense) is a variation of the sandwich, with the addition of panceta.

The chivito can be served as a platter rather than a sandwich (chivito al plato). It is usually served with French fries.

== See also ==
- List of sandwiches
- Roast beef sandwich
