= Francisco Lema Ullet =

Spanish flamenco singer (1869–1940)

Francisco Lema Ullet (Cádiz, 1869 – Madrid, 1940) was a Spanish flamenco singer, known as Fosforito or Fosforito el Viejo, with no relation to another singer of the same name: Antonio Fernández "Fosforito".

== Biography ==
The nickname of Fosforito – later "Fosforito el Viejo" – came from his height and extreme thinness. He performed, almost always with Antonio Chacón, in the main singing cafés of his time. A disciple of Enrique Jiménez "el Mellizo" (1825–1903), he began singing at the age of fourteen in the Café del Palenque in Jerez de la Frontera.

After marrying the dancer Mariquita Malvido, succeeding in Malaga, and traveling half of Spain with his performances, he settled in Madrid in 1891, where he enjoyed his greatest success. He performed in the Café de Monedero and later moved to the Teatro Novedades, the cafés of Romero and Naranjeros, and inaugurated the Café del Brillante. In 1898 he returned to his native Cádiz to perform in the Circo Teatro Gaditano with Rafael Pareja, El Morcilla, El Quiqui, Patiño, and Habichuela. A year later, on March 4, 1899, he received a tribute in the same place with the participation of La Rondalla Aragonesa, the Comparsa Los Relojes and the Sociedad Coral Frégoli, the singer El Quiqui and the guitarist El Pollo. On his return to Madrid, he took part again in the intimate parties and meetings of the colmaos Los Gabrieles, Villa Rosa, and Fornos.

In his best years, he was almost as popular as Chacón. There was a great rivalry between Chacón and Fosforito when one worked in the Café de Silverio and the other in the Café del Burrero. This rivalry led to the businessmen agreeing on schedules so that the public of one place could move to the other and have the opportunity to listen to the two singers on the same night.

In the middle of the 1920s, he stopped singing, dying in the greatest poverty in a pension in the Madrid street Mesón de Paredes, in the early 1940s.

He stood out for siguiriyas and achieved notable success with his interpretations of malagueñas.
