= Jesuita (sandwich) =

Argentinian and Uruguayan sandwich

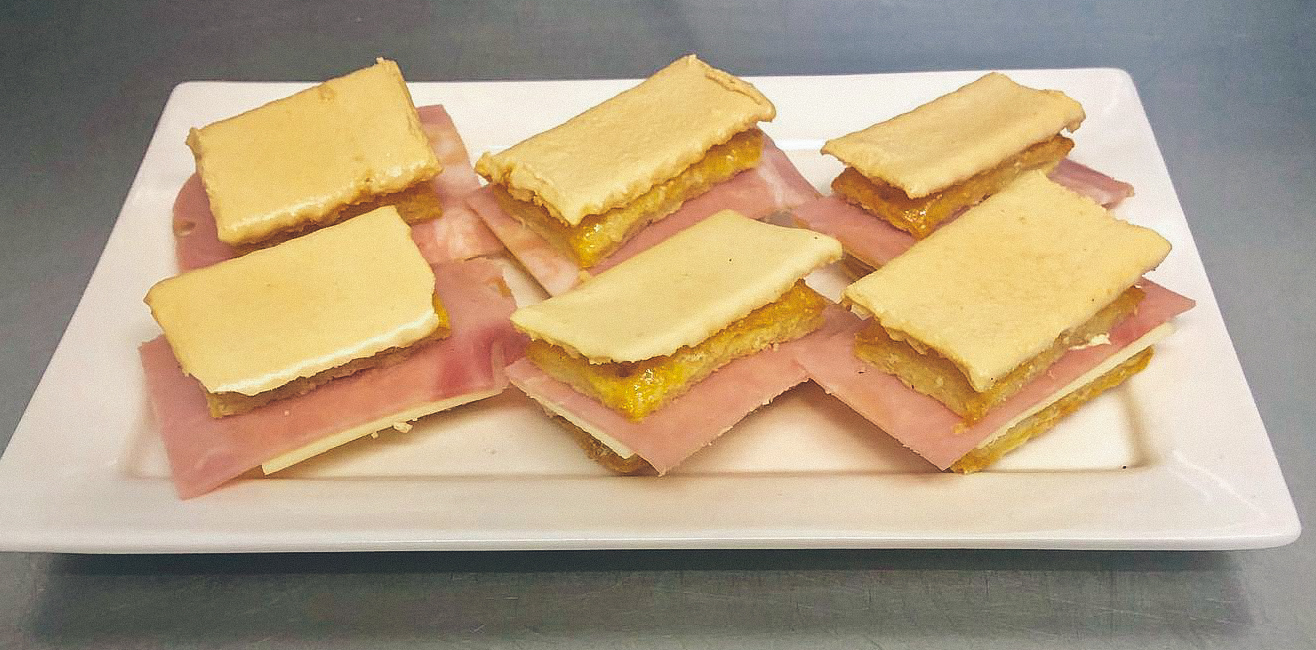
- Type: Sandwich
- Course: Appetizer, snack, or main
- Region or state: South America
- Associated cuisine: Argentine
- Main ingredients: Ham, cheese, puff pastry
- Ingredients generally used: Sugar, egg white

A jesuita (as known in Uruguay) or fosforito (Argentina, lit. "matchstick") is a baked sandwich commonly eaten in parts of South America and considered a classic of Argentinian cuisine. It consists of two pieces of puff pastry filled with thin slices of ham and cheese.

== Origins ==
The origins of the dish are European, brought to Argentina and Uruguay by colonizers. Although long commonly available in Argentinian bakeries, their popularity had waned until an interest in home baking and professional interest among pastry chefs in traditional dishes resurged in 2020.

== Ingredients and preparation ==
The puff pastry is typically lightly glazed with a sugary egg-white mixture similar to royal icing. Some recipes call for the sandwiches to be assembled with the pastry raw, brushed with the glaze, and baked until the puff pastry is browned and crispy and the cheese has melted. Others call for baking the pastry separately and filling the baked sheets with ham and cheese.

== Serving ==
They are small in size and often served as a party food; they also can be served as an appetizer, snack, or meal. They can be served hot or cold. The flavor is both sweet and salty.

== Similarly-named dishes ==
A similarly named sweet pastry known in Portugal, Spain and parts of South America, the jesuit, consists of puff pastry filled with custard. In Germany, Jesuitermützen are a custard-filled pastry traditionally cut into triangles. In France the pastry is filled with frangipane and called a jésuite.

== See also ==
- Ham and cheese sandwich
- List of sandwiches
