= Argentine pizza =

Pizza variants in Argentina

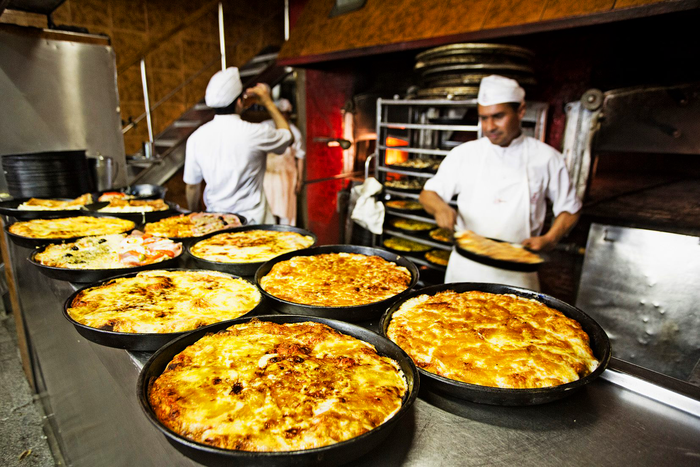
- Traditional pizzas al molde being prepared at a pizzeria in Buenos Aires
- Type: Pizza
- Place of origin: Argentina
- Region or state: Buenos Aires
- Invented: c. 1890–1930
- Main ingredients: Pizza dough; wheat flour; salt; water; yeast; oil; tomato sauce; mozzarella
- Ingredients generally used: Typical toppings: olives; sliced tomatoes and garlic (napolitana); ham and bell peppers; chorizo or longaniza (calabresa); heart of palm and salsa golf; provolone; arugula and dry-cured ham
- Variations: Pizza al molde; pizza a la piedra; fugazza (and the derivative fugazzeta); pizza de cancha or canchera
- Other information: Commonly eaten algonside fainá

Argentine pizza, also known as Porteño-style pizza (Spanish: pizza porteña, i.e., Buenos Aires-style pizza), is a mainstay of the country's cuisine, especially of its capital Buenos Aires, where it is regarded as a cultural heritage and icon of the city. Argentina is the country with the most pizzerias per inhabitant in the world and, although they are consumed throughout the country, the highest concentration of pizzerias and customers is in Buenos Aires, the city with the highest consumption of pizzas in the world (estimated in 2015 to be 14 million per year). As such, the city has been considered one of the world capitals of pizza.

Pizza was introduced to Buenos Aires in the late 19th century with a marked influx of Italian immigration, as part of a broader European immigration wave to the country. Thus, around the same time that the pizza Margherita was being invented in Italy, pizzas were already being cooked in the Argentine capital. The impoverished Italian immigrants who arrived in the city transformed the originally modest dish into a hefty meal, motivated by the abundance of food in Argentina. In the 1930s, pizza was cemented in Buenos Aires culture, with the new pizzerias becoming a central space for sociability for the working-class people who flocked to the city.

A typical custom is to accompany pizza with fainá, a pancake made from chickpea flour.

== Characteristics and variants ==
=== Traditional styles of pizza ===
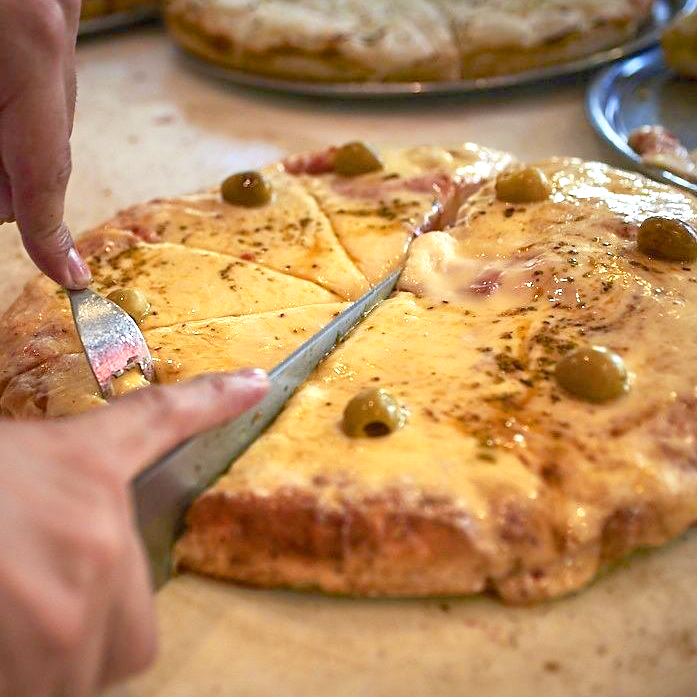
A traditional pizza al molde in Buenos Aires, characterized by its thick, bready crust and large amount of mozzarella cheese

The most characteristic style of Argentine pizza—which almost all the classic pizzerias in Buenos Aires specialize in—is the so-called pizza al molde (Spanish for 'pan style pizza'), characterized by having a "thick, spongy base and elevated bready crust". Writing for Saveur in 2016, Allie Lazar defined the pizza al molde style:

[It] consists of a high-rising alta masa (high dough), generally reaching at least 2 cm, or a media masa (half dough) coming in at around 1.5 cm in height, and cooked in... yes, a pan. It's similar to focaccia bread in which both the crust and inner dough have the same thick, spongy texture. When made right, the base has a sturdy crunch and the top overflows with a small amount of sauce and a lot of bubbling cheese that dreamily crisps at the bottom of the pan. Because pizza al molde is so thick and cheesy, the average eater only consumes about two slices.

Another of the most typical styles of pizza in the country is the so-called pizza a la piedra (piedra meaning 'stone' in Spanish), which began to become popular in the mid-1970s and especially in the 1980s. Unlike the pizza al molde, this pizza is characterized by a thin, crispy, and crumb-free crust, and is baked directly on the base of a stone oven and not in a pan (hence its name). According to Lazar:

Made in a wood-fired or a gas oven, this lighter slice comes out with a crispy thin crust that is slightly chewy. A good amount of tomato sauce is spread on top, along with a healthy helping of cheese and fresh toppings. Many consider this type of pizza to be more modern, and pizzerias have adapted their original concept to add this style to its repertoire.

Most pizza menus include standard flavor combinations, including the traditional plain mozzarella, nicknamed muza or musa; the napolitana or napo, with "cheese, sliced tomatoes, garlic, dried oregano and a few green olives", not to be confused with Neapolitan pizza; calabresa, with slices of longaniza; jamon y morrones, with sliced ham and roasted bell peppers; as well as versions with provolone, with anchovies, with hearts of palm, or with chopped hard-boiled egg.

A unique tradition from Buenos Aires is to eat pizza alongside fainá (known in Italy as farinata), a baked pancake made of chickpea flour, a custom that also spread to Uruguay due to its close cultural ties to the city. Like pizza, fainá was introduced by Italian immigrants, particularly the Genoese that settled in La Boca, and the combination of both dishes probably developed in that working-class neighborhood in the early 20th century. According to Amy Booth of the BBC, the "subtle, creamy texture of the fainá softens the acidity of the tomato sauce and moderates the greasy tang of the cheese".

==== Fugazza and fugazzeta ====
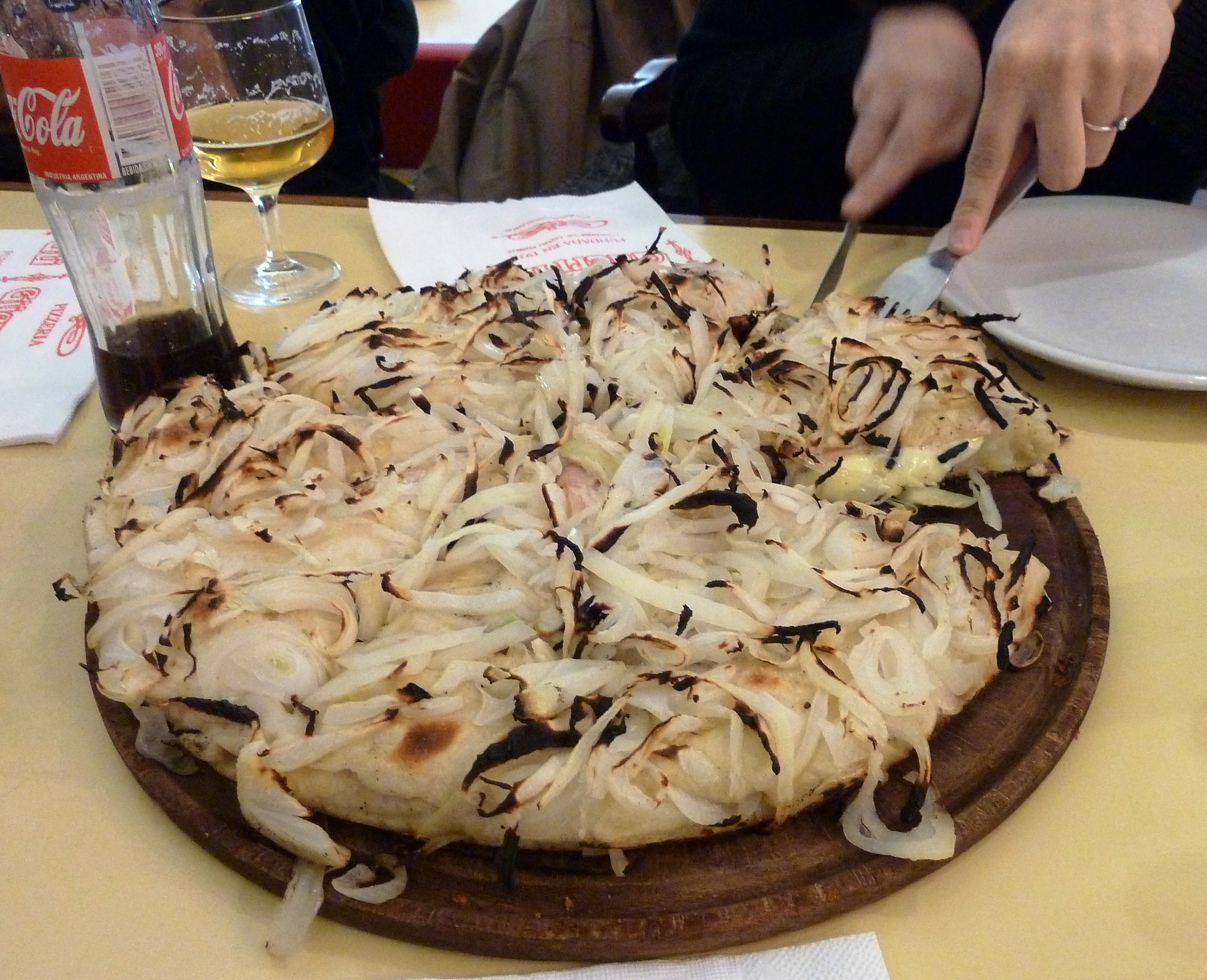
A typical fugazzetta, consisting of two discs of pizza dough with cheese in the middle and onion on top

Within the category of pizza al molde, other local creations include the fugazza and its derivatives fugazza con queso or americana, a terminology that varies depending on the pizzeria, and fugazzeta. The fugazza—named after fugassa, the Genoese word for focaccia—is a cheese-less pizza, consisting of a disk of dough topped with onions, oregano and grains of salt; the fugazza con queso (lit. 'fugazza with cheese') is the same with added mozzarella on top. Fugazzeta consists of two discs of pizza dough with cheese in the middle and onion on top, hence its original name. According to Lazar, fugazza con queso or fugazza americana is a fugazza with "an added mozzarella cheese-bonus on top", while the original fugazzeta is "stuffed with an obscene dose of queso cuartirolo (a local version of the Italian quartirolo Lombardo) and covered in sweet, soft onions".

The origin of fugazzeta is attributed to Juan Banchero, son of Genoese baker Agustín Banchero, who transformed the family business into one of the first pizzerias in the Buenos Aires, Banchero, which is still in operation. According to legend, Juan Banchero "tried to save [his father's] dry, sub-par fugassa alla genovese (Genoese focaccia) by slicing it down the middle and stuffing it with cheese". Regarding the correct terminology for this creation, researcher Jorge D'Agostini explained, "Strictly speaking, it is a fugazzeta, because the fugazza is a disk of dough with onion on top. I think that the confusion or the different ways of calling the pizzas has to do with the changes and transformations that the recipes had here. Banchero added cheese, that's why they called it fugazza con queso when what they serve is fugazzeta." Today, this Argentine pizza is regarded as an icon of Buenos Aires and Argentine cuisine.

==== Pizza de cancha or pizza canchera ====
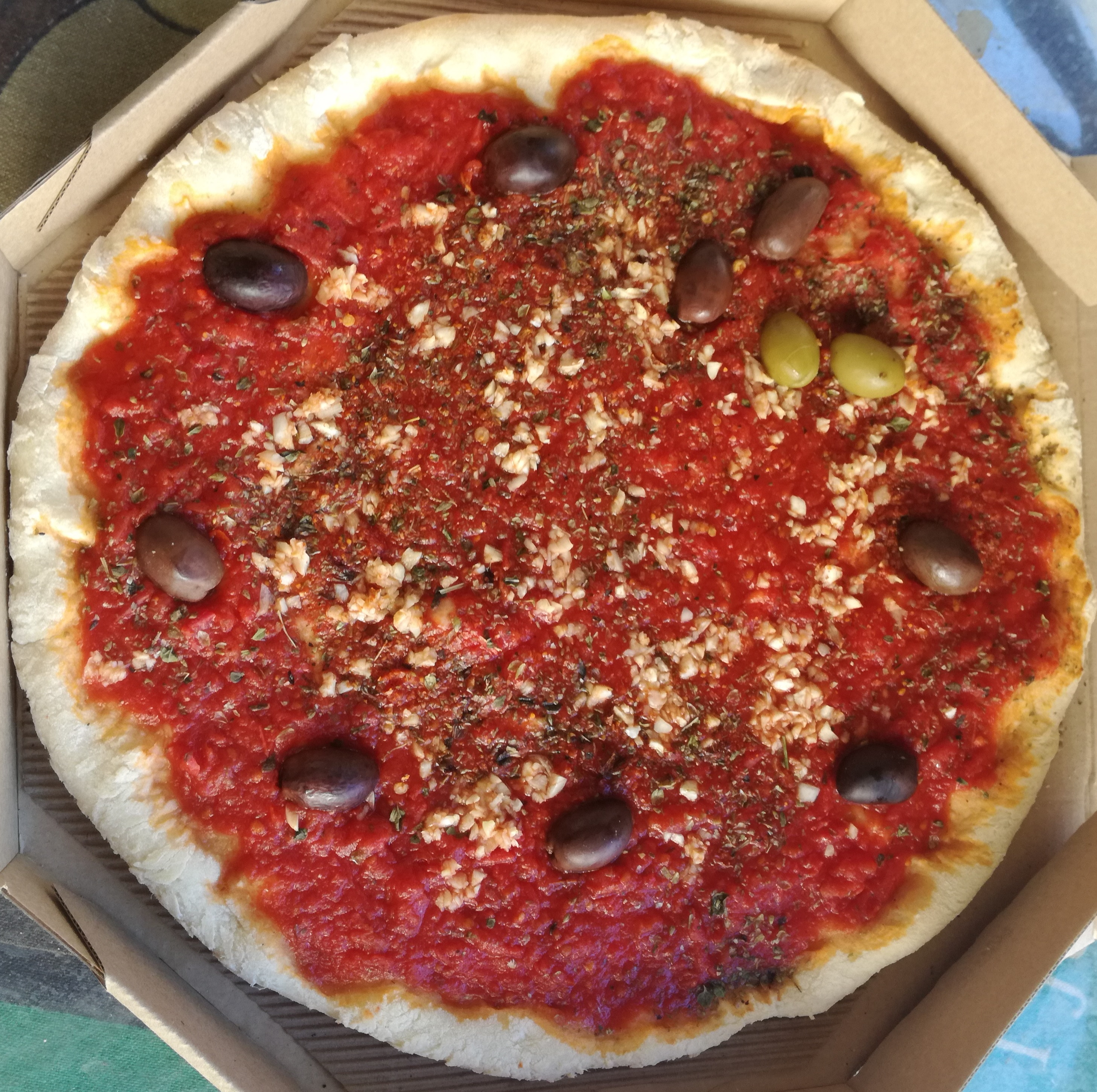
Another local creation, the pizza de cancha (or pizza canchera) is a cheese-less variant covered in a heavily seasoned tomato sauce.

Another variant of Buenos Aires origin is the pizza de cancha, also known as pizza canchera, of the media masa type. As it is a cheese-less pizza, it has been described as an "oddball" and a "total anomaly, debunking everything we know to be true about Argentine pizza". The pizza de cancha is "covered in a red sauce and heavily seasoned with garlic, onion, and non-spicy red pepper flakes, similar to what you would find in bakeries across southern Italy". It was invented by Oscar Vianini, founder of the pizzeria Angelín, one of the oldest traditional pizzerias in Buenos Aires that still operate and well-known in its neighborhood, Villa Crespo.

Viniani sold slices of this pizza on the street outside the Atlanta Club stadium when there was a game, hence its name (cancha, meaning 'soccer field' or 'stadium' in Argentina). There are other versions that claim that the pizza de cancha was created in another stadium, including the ones belonging to Argentinos Juniors or Boca Juniors. The pizza was also known as pizza de tacho (Spanish for "bin"), alluding to the metal container in which they were carried stacked by street vendors. It is typically larger in diameter than other Argentine pizzas, as this originally allowed street vendors to sell more slices.

=== Other styles available in the country ===
Other styles of pizza besides the Argentine have become popular in Buenos Aires, such as New York-style pizza, Neapolitan pizza (and hybrids of this style with the Argentine one), or grilled pizza (Spanish: pizza a la parrilla). In 2022, Ti Amo, a pizzeria specializing in the Neapolitan style located in the city of Adrogué, Buenos Aires Province, was chosen as one of the 50 best in the world according to the Italian guide 50 Top Pizza, which each year chooses the 100 most outstanding in the sector globally. Ti Amo once again appeared as one of the best pizzerias in the world according to The Best Pizza Awards 2023, with another pizzeria in the country also appearing: Eléctrica, from Buenos Aires, which offers a contemporary style of pizza.

== History ==
=== 1870–1930: origins in Italian immigration ===
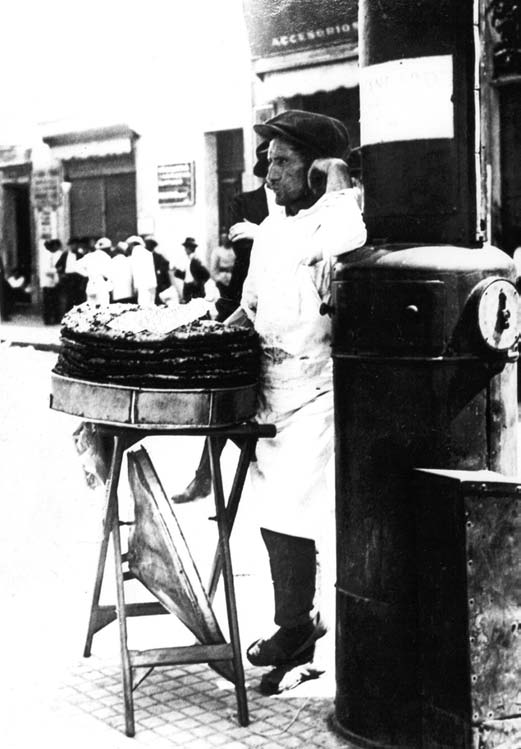
Genoese immigrant Ricardo Ravadero selling pizzas on the streets of Buenos Aires, c. late 19th–early 20th centuries

The history of Argentine pizza is strongly linked to the history of the city of Buenos Aires. The dish was introduced to the country in the late 19th century by Italian immigrants, particularly those of Genoese origin, who arrived in Buenos Aires and mostly settled in the lower-class port neighborhood of La Boca. Between the late 19th and the early 20th centuries, Buenos Aires was the site of a broader European immigration wave, becoming a large cosmopolitan city and changing the customs of its inhabitants. Around 3 million Italians arrived at the port of Buenos Aires between 1870 and 1920, which represents almost two-thirds of the total immigration of the period. As a result, Italian immigration radically altered Argentine culture, especially that of the city, and its influence can be found in aspects such as its language or its cuisine. Pizza as known today—with risen dough, tomato sauce and sometimes cheese, since it was very expensive—began to be sold as a lower-class street food in Naples in the 19th century; the term had been for centuries a generic name in the region for different types of flat doughs with condiments or fillings. There were sweet and savory versions of pizza, as attested by the book La scienza in cucina e l'arte di mangiar bene (1891) by Pellegrino Artusi, although it was the latter that traveled to Argentina and became popular.

It is not known exactly when or how pizza arrived from Naples in Buenos Aires. Writing about the origins of the dish in the Argentine capital, historian Horacio Julio Spinetto notes that the first documented cases involve the Neapolitan immigrant Nicola Vaccarezza, who made the first fainá of the country in his pizza oven in La Boca in 1882, and Ricardo Ravadero, a Genoese immigrant who dedicated himself to the street sale of pizzas, which he stacked inside a metal bin that he mounted on wooden trestles. Nevertheless, La Nación pointed out in 2023 that the Vaccarezza story is apocryphal and actually arose from a fictional story published in the 1990s, and since then has been wrongly cited in books and numerous newspaper articles, which over time changed the fainá of the story into pizza.

La Nación noted that although "there is no evidence to support [the Vaccarezza] story, neither in the fainá version nor in the pizza version [...], the initial story is correct in one thing: in Buenos Aires, the fainá was sold first." By 1893, this dish was sold on the streets of La Boca and in the store of Genoese immigrant Santo Battifora. When Battifora returned to Genoa, he left the business in the hands of his brother-in-law, Antonio Piccardo, better known as "Tuñín", who made it grow and gain recognition under that name. Also in 1893, Genoese immigrant Agustín Banchero opened his bakery in La Boca where, according to legend, he later created the fugazza con queso. In 1896, journalist Marcos Arredondo reported that the street sale of fainá in La Boca "was already a classic". Fainá later began to be sold in the Mercado del Abasto and in the Paseo de Julio (current Alem avenue).

Since its introduction, pizza grew to become a common main dish over the years, as evidenced by the inclusion of a "family pizza" recipe in a 1914 cookbook by Francisco Figueredo. What today is identified as the typical style of Argentine pizza—characterized by a thick crust and a large amount of cheese—arose when impoverished Italian immigrants found a greater abundance of food in then-prosperous Argentina, which motivated them to transform the originally modest dish into a robust meal suitable as a main course. This style is known as pizza de molde (Spanish for 'pizza in the pan'), which emerged because there were no pizza ovens in the city, so bakers resorted to baking them in pans. Since they used bakery plates, Argentine pizzas were initially square or rectangular, a format associated with the 1920s that is still maintained in some classic pizzerias, especially for vegetable pizzas, fugazzetas and fugazzas.

=== 1930–1950: transformation ===
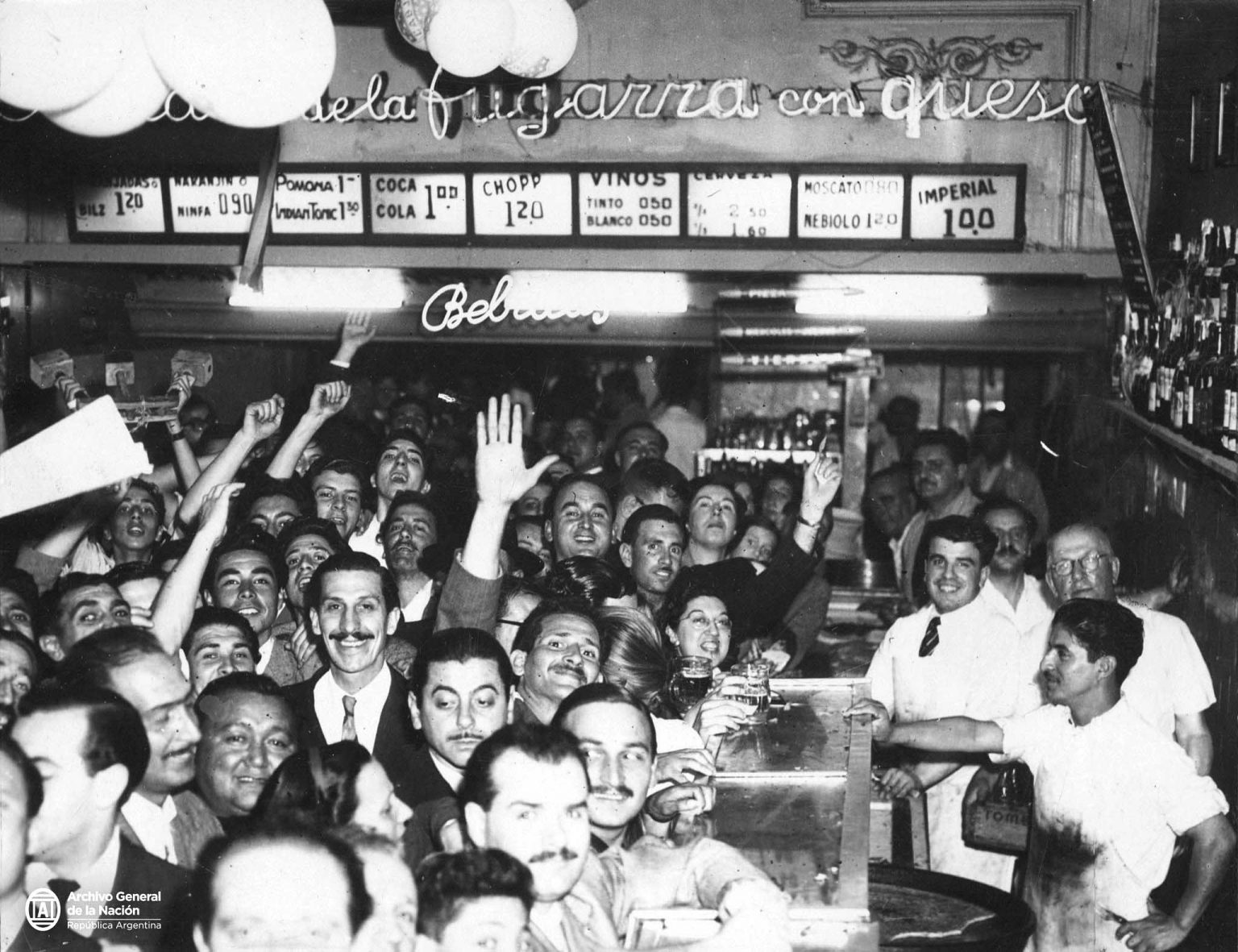
View of the pizzeria Banchero in La Boca, c. 1930s–1940s

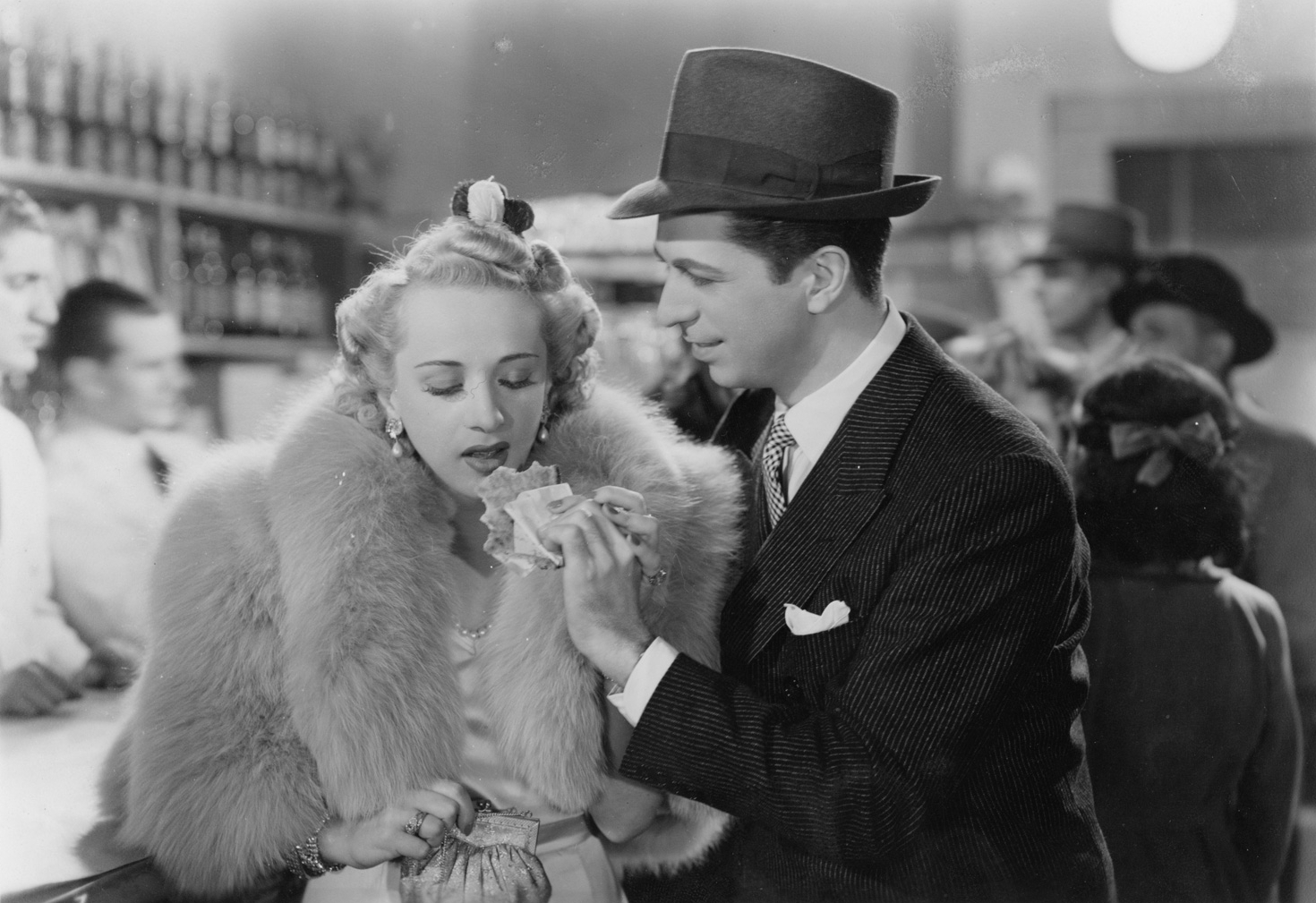
In the 1940 comedy film Isabelita, an aristocratic girl played by Paulina Singerman immerses herself in the working-class culture of Buenos Aires, with pizza being one of its defining aspects.

In the 1930s, the Great Depression caused a change in the country's economic policy, which turned to import substitution industrialization to supply the domestic market and generate jobs. The installation of new industries in Buenos Aires reinforced the hegemonic position of the city and caused a flow of internal migration that replaced the previous European immigration, made up of people from the provinces who joined the city as industrial workers. As a result, the social composition of the city and its popular culture underwent great changes, which once again affected the history of Argentine pizza.

The 1930s have been described as a "golden age" of Argentine pizza, as well as the time when the "pizzeria was born as a gastronomic venue and as an institution". Buenos Aires had a great urban development during the decade, including the widening of Corrientes avenue in 1936. The avenue entered a period of splendor and was filled with theaters and restaurants, including several notable pizzerias that are still in business today and are considered classic, such as Güerrín, Las Cuartetas, El Cuartito and Angelín. During this time, pizzerias established themselves as one of the great spaces for social activity for the working classes of the city, and the popular combination of pizza with fainá was also consolidated, because the Genoese sold it at the exits of football games. According to writer Ignacio Xurxo, during the 1930s and 1940s Buenos Aires "became addicted to pizza".

This pizza boom can be seen to begin in 1931. That year, billboards appeared in Tuñín inviting people to try pizza a la napolitana, RCA Victor released the single "Fainá y pizza" by the musician Cleto Minocchio, and the category "fainá and pizza houses" appeared for the first time in the authoritative Anuario Kraft, an annual trade and industry guide. There were 11 establishments on the list: two in La Boca, two in Barracas, one in Monserrat, one in Congreso, three in Constitución, one in Abasto and another on the current border between Balvanera and Recoleta. Also in 1931 a recipe for modern pizza appeared in an Argentine cookbook for the first time; in El arte culinario. tratado de cocina universal, Carlos Spriano includes the recipe for pizza a la napolitana, with its risen dough, tomato sauce and mozzarella.

In 1932, the Anuario Kraft reveals an abrupt growth in the sector, listing 45 "fainá and pizza houses" scattered throughout the city. According to La Nación, "1932 is also noted as the year of arrival, or at least of the first documented mentions, of some of the current historic pizzerias such as Güerrín, Banchero and Las Cuartetas. In 1934 El Cuartito would be added; in 1935, La Americana; in 1938, Angelín." By the 1940s, it became evident that pizza was a firmly established and long-lasting phenomenon in the city. In a 1949 article focused on the sociability of Buenos Aires pizzerias, journalist and cartoonist Luis J. Medrano reflected:

The typical characteristics that distinguished the political development of our country until a few years ago are well known to all. The nation was constantly agitated by the struggle of two great political parties that fiercely disputed the privilege of governing the Argentine people... But what really interests our commentary is, in the first place, to bring to the reader's memory a dreadful social problem, which in those times and at the time of each periodic transfer of power, cast its black mantle of anguish over a vast sector of the electorate. The entire National Administration automatically ceased its functions to make room for an equivalent number of hard-working citizens who, with renewed energy, returned to their tasks after six or more years of waiting.

It would be naive to attribute to a coincidence the fact that at that time, first timidly, street vendors were born into the commercial life of the country, and then, with surprising virulence, establishments selling a delicacy whose acceptance by the public would eventually mean a true revolution: pizza. (...)

Those who tried to deny that laid-off employees gave birth to pizzerias were hard-pressed to reject the hypothesis that these picturesque businesses owe their greatness and their initial impulse to that mass of hard-working citizens whom the sway of politics alternately placed in prosperous happiness or in the cruelest destitution. (...)

At midday, the unfortunate worker, with his feet in tatters, made his daily balance on the table of a bar, verifying at the end of simple operations, that the resources so summarily arbitrary, only authorized him to dip three medialunas in a cup of coffee with milk.

Needless to say about the demoralizing consequences that such a life brought with it to such a large number of citizens... It was then when the magical and tasty food appeared on the national gastronomic scene, which for a few coins, left in the stomach the most approximate sensation of a lunch. With natural exhilaration, the former employee found a way to get through the painful wait better fed and in a more pleasant atmosphere, first sympathizing and eventually becoming fond of the pizzeria. He became an obliged parishioner and eventually a friend of the owner, the latter jealously placed behind a cash register that became shinier, heavier and more expensive every semester...

=== 1950–present: more recent developments ===
In the mid-1970s and especially in the 1980s, the thinner pizza a la piedra became popular as an alternative to the city's heavy traditional pizza. In 2011, BBC News reported that pizzerias were "mounting a strong challenge to be the most popular gastronomic option" in Buenos Aires and "could overtake the amount of steak houses in the next two years". Every year since 2012, a "pizza marathon" called Muza 5K takes place in Buenos Aires, in which the participants visit a series of pizzerias on Avenida Corrientes that serve the typical mozzarella pizza de molde by the slice and then vote for the best pizza on the circuit.

== See also ==
- Media related to Pizzas in Argentina at Wikimedia Commons
- Argentine cheese
- List of pizza varieties by country

== Bibliography ==
- Pizzerías de valor patrimonial de Buenos Aires (PDF) (in Spanish). Buenos Aires: Dirección General Patrimonio e Instituto Histórico. Gobierno de la Ciudad de Buenos Aires. 2008. ISBN 978-987-244-348-1. Archived from the original (PDF) on 7 September 2018.
