= Socca (food) =

Chickpea pancake from Provence, France

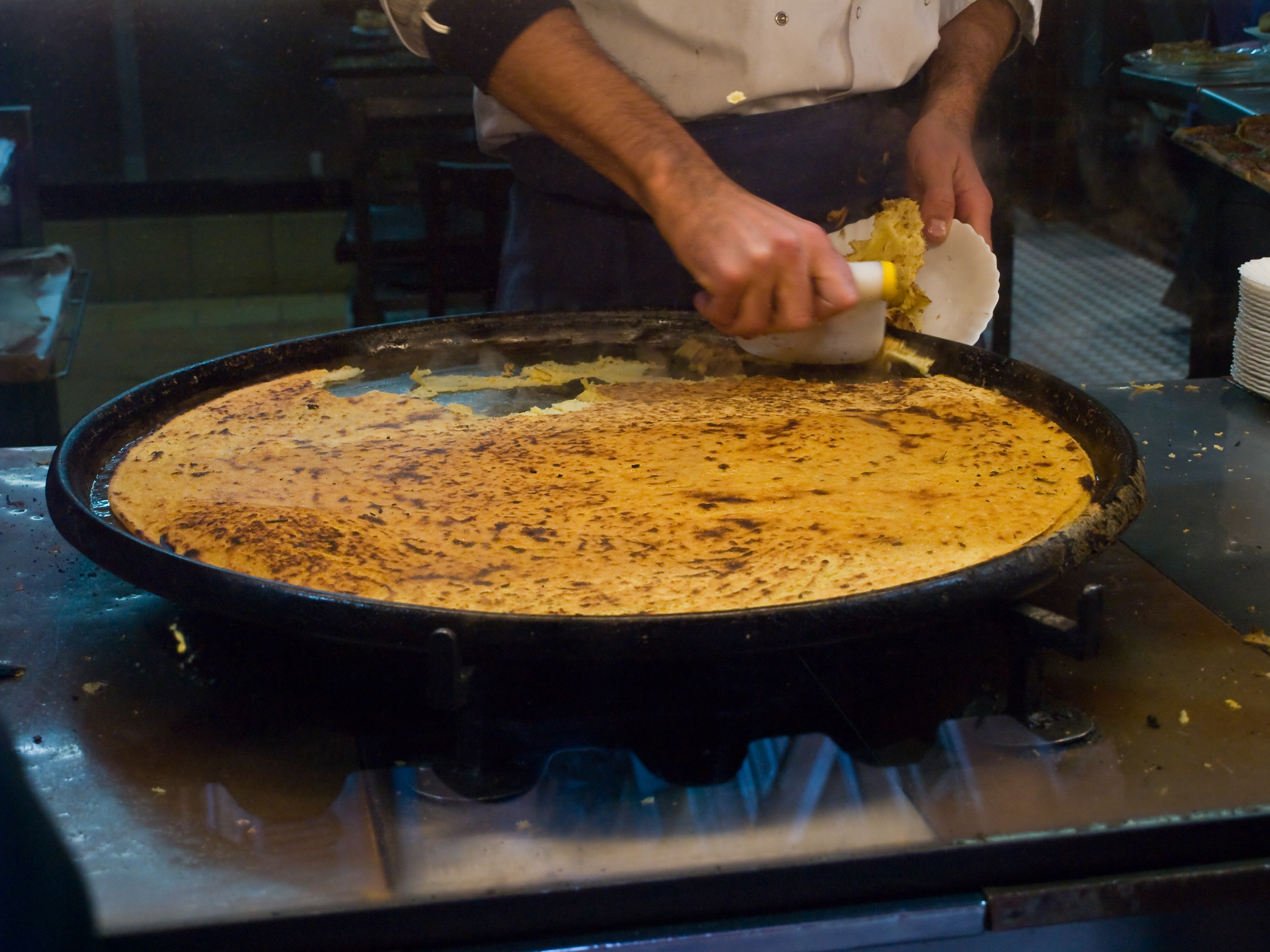
Socca

Socca is a thin, unleavened pancake or crêpe made from chickpea flour, water, olive oil, and salt. It is a traditional street food originating from the Provence region of southeastern France and the Ligurian coast of northwestern Italy. Most commonly associated with the city of Nice, France, socca is typically cooked in a wood-fired oven on large copper pans and served hot, with freshly ground black pepper.

== History ==
Socca has ancient roots in the Mediterranean basin, with chickpeas and chickpea flour being staples of the region's diet for millennia. The earliest known use of chickpea flour dates back over 8,000 years to Ancient Egypt and the Levant. These early civilizations cultivated chickpeas for their high protein content and resilience in poor soil conditions, laying the foundation for their widespread use in later culinary traditions.

During the Middle Ages, the chickpea gained new prominence in Europe, thanks in part to the Crusades. Returning crusaders brought with them knowledge and appreciation of legumes used in Middle Eastern cuisine, including chickpea-based dishes. By the 9th century, Charlemagne had reportedly recommended the cultivation of chickpeas across his empire, further embedding the crop in European agriculture.

It was in the 15th century, particularly in the Ligurian port city of Genoa, that the concept of turning chickpea flour into a baked pancake or galette took recognizable form. The dish, now known as farinata in Italian, became a staple in the region due to its affordability, simplicity, and nutritional value. The Republic of Genoa, which maintained territories and trading posts throughout the Mediterranean, helped disseminate this culinary tradition to various regions, including the County of Nice.

Nice, which was part of the Principauté de Savoie until its annexation to France in 1860, developed its own distinct variation of the dish. By the 17th century, local cooks had refined the preparation method, spreading the chickpea batter thinly onto large, round copper pans coated in olive oil and baking it quickly in wood-fired ovens. This created the crispy exterior and creamy interior that define socca today.

The dish rose to prominence in Nice during the early 20th century, when it became a common snack among laborers, dockworkers and market-goers. Street vendors sold hot wedges of socca from carts or small stalls, serving it in paper cones and seasoning it with freshly ground black pepper. It became deeply associated with the working-class identity of the city and a symbol of Niçoise street food culture.

Though its popularity declined in the late 20th century, the dish has experienced a revival in recent years, in part due to the renewed interest in plant-based, gluten-free and traditional Mediterranean diets.

== Ingredients and preparation ==
The traditional recipe for socca includes chickpea flour, water, olive oil, salt and sometimes freshly ground black pepper.

Socca batter is made by whisking chickpea flour with water, olive oil, and salt until smooth. The mixture is poured into a generously oiled, large, round, shallow copper pan and baked in a very hot oven, traditionally wood-fired. The result is a crispy, slightly blistered crust with a tender, almost creamy interior. Socca is typically sliced into rough wedges or strips and eaten hot, often as a snack or appetizer.

== Similar dishes ==
- Farinata : savory Italian chickpea pancake made from chickpea flour, water, olive oil, and salt.
- Karantika : Algerian street food made from chickpea flour, often topped with beaten eggs and baked, served hot with harissa and cumin, often in bread.
- Cecina : also known as Cecina Toscana or Tuscan chickpea flatbread, an Italian dish made from chickpea flour, water, olive oil, salt, and pepper.
- Calentita : Gibraltarian flatbread made from chickpea flour, water, olive oil, salt, and pepper.
- Panella : Sicilian fritter made from chickpea flour, water, salt, pepper, olive oil, and finely chopped parsley.
- Panisse : crispy chickpea flour fry from the South of France.
- Cade : chickpea cake from Toulon, France.
- Chilla : chickpea based pancake typically found in north India. With added chilli powder in the batter, it is usually topped with onions and coriander.
