= Güerrín =

Pizzeria in Buenos Aires, Argentina

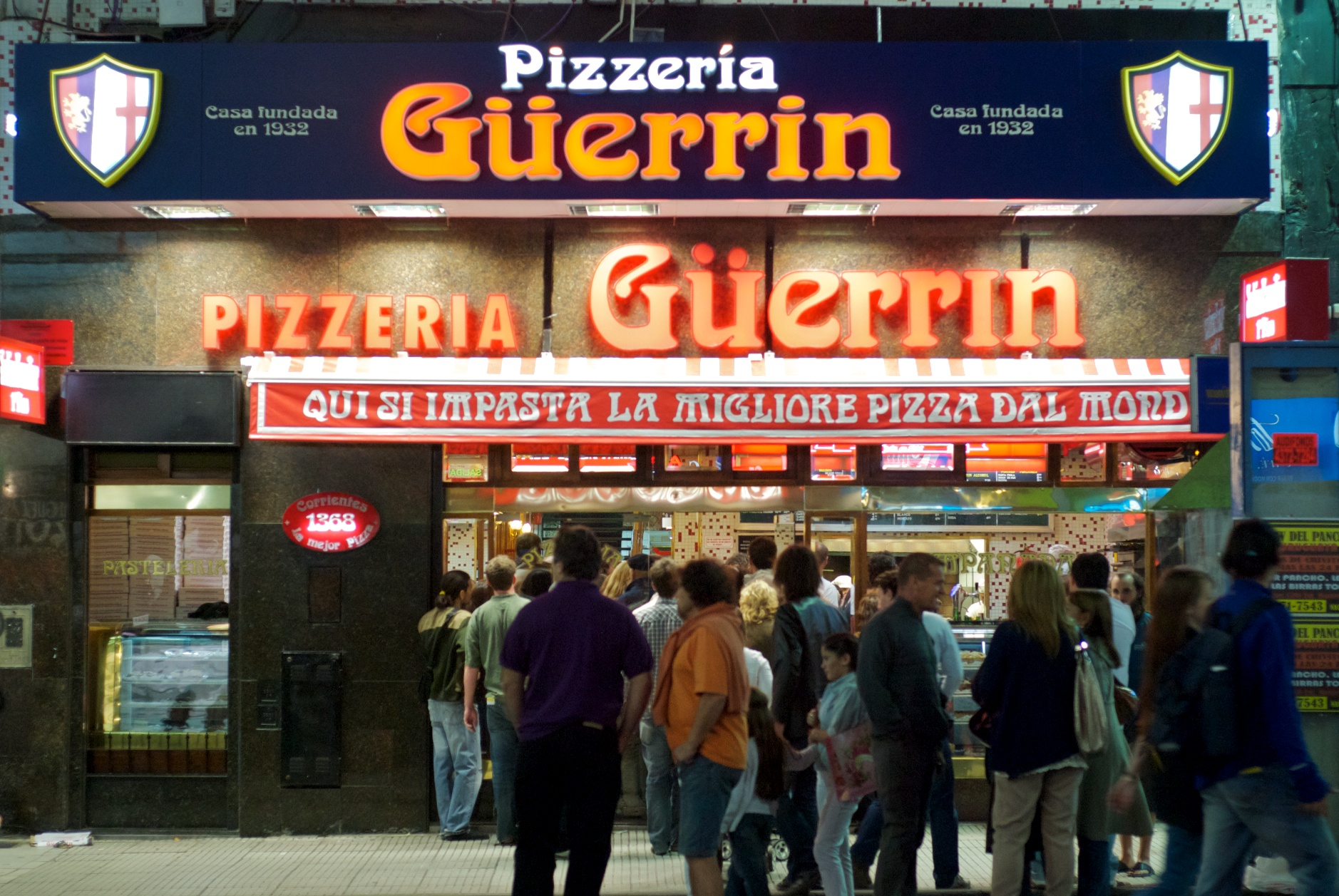
Güerrín pizzeria entrance on Corrientes Avenue

Güerrín (Spanish pronunciation: [gweˈrin]) is a pizzeria in Buenos Aires, Argentina, where the speciality of the restaurant is the Argentine pizza. Guerrin was declared by the Buenos Aires City Legislature as one of the most iconic pizzerias of the city in 2011.

== History ==
It was founded in 1932 by two Italian immigrants Geronimo Benavides and Facundo Castro Boyle. The location is on the number 1368 Corrientes Avenue, occupying the same place since its foundation. The particularity of the pizzeria is that the pizzas are cooked using a wood-fired pizza oven and thick pizza dough. The restaurant also offers some of Argentine varieties of pizzas like fugazza and farinata (fainá), created by Lucas Vespoli, an awarded chef contributed to the pizzeria with these recipes. According the site TasteAtlas is one of the most iconic places in Buenos Aires to eat.

The place has different rooms according to the type of clients, there are places to eat pizza on the go standing rooms with space for many diners, and a room with more privacy without much noise.
