= Caliente =

Caliente may refer to:

== Music ==
- Caliente (Calle Ciega album), 2000
- Caliente (Vox Dei album)
- "Caliente" (Dyland & Lenny song)
- "Caliente" (Inna song), 2012
- "Caliente" (Jay Santos song), 2012
- "Caliente" (Lali song), 2018
- Caliente, 1997 album by Willie & Lobo

== Places ==
- Caliente, California, United States
- Caliente, Nevada, United States
- Ojo Caliente Spring, a hot spring in Yellowstone National Park
- Caliente Mountain, in the Southern Coast Ranges of California
- Caliente Range, a west–east trending zone of uplift mountains in the Pacific Coast Ranges, in central California

== Other ==
- Caliente, an alternative name for the Kawaiisu, an ethnic group of the Southwestern United States
- Caliente (TV series), a popular Spanish-language television show on Univision that aired from 1995 to 2006
- Caliente (Sirius XM), a Latin American music station on XM Satellite Radio
- Casino Caliente, a chain of casinos in Baja California and other states of Mexico
- Jiggly Caliente (1980–2025), Filipino-American drag performer and entertainer
- Miami Caliente, a Lingerie Football League team
- USS Caliente (AO-53), a Cimarron-class fleet oiler built during World War II for the U.S. Navy
- Caliente (dish), a Moroccan street food dish

== See also ==
- Hot (disambiguation)
- Agua Caliente (disambiguation) ("Hot Springs")
- King Kaliente, a character from the video game Super Mario Galaxy
