= Karantika =

Algerian street dish

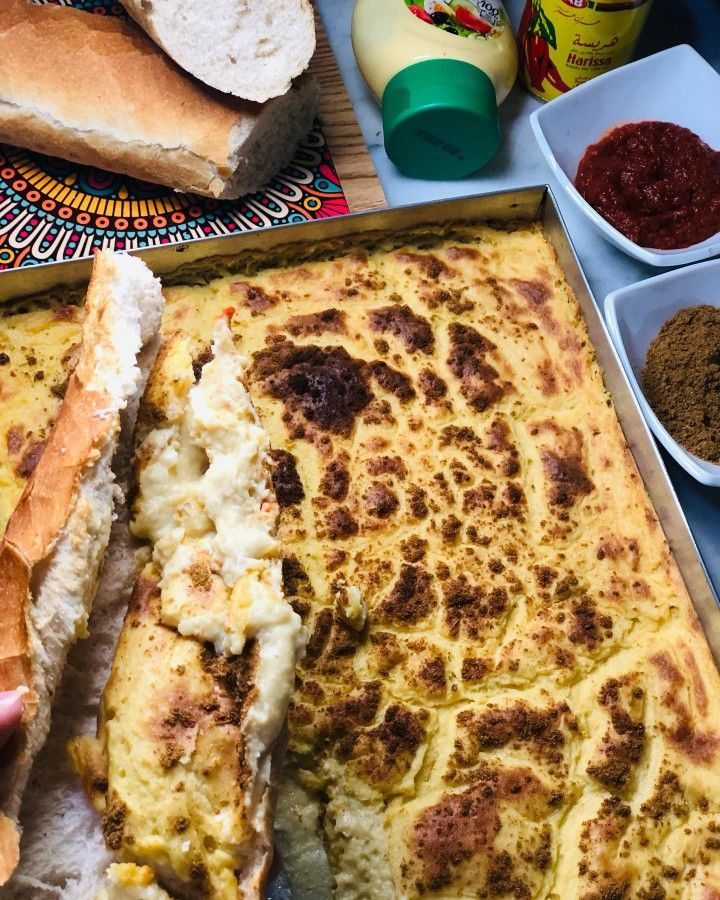
- Alternative names: Karan, grantita
- Type: Street food
- Course: Meal, snack, side dish, sandwich filling
- Place of origin: Algeria
- Region or state: Oran
- Associated cuisine: Algerian cuisine, Mediterranean cuisine
- Serving temperature: Hot
- Main ingredients: Chickpea
- Ingredients generally used: Oil, eggs

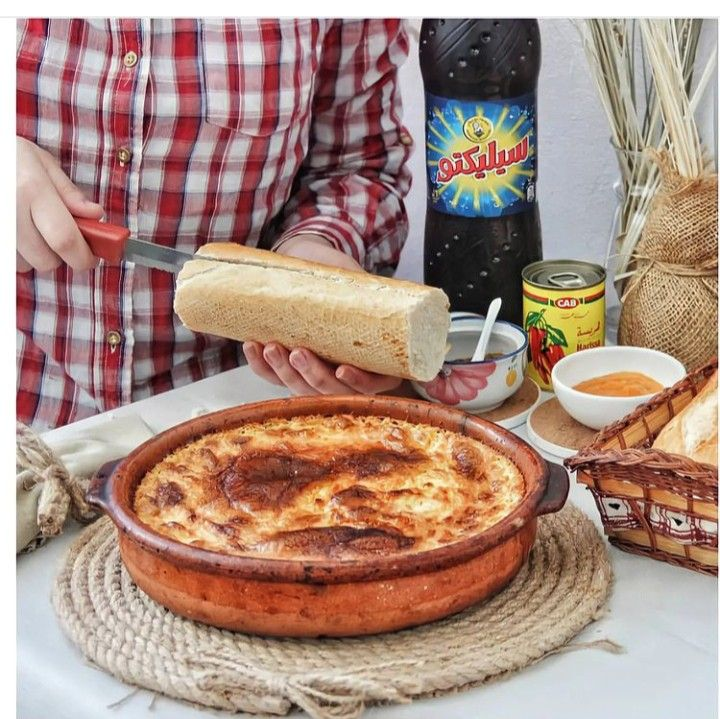
Oranian karantika

Karantika (Arabic: كارنتيكا) (Tamazight: ⴽⴰⵔⴰⵏⵜⵉⴽⴰ) is an iconic Algerian street food sold throughout the Maghreb by street vendors. It has similarities to pies, pancakes, and flans and consists of a chickpea batter topped with beaten egg and baked, served with harissa and cumin either hot on bread as a sandwich, or sliced into squares.

It originated in and remains a specialty of Oran, where it was first introduced by Spanish invaders in the 16th century, and was spread throughout Algeria during the French occupation of the country.

The dish is also served in restaurants and made in homes.

== Etymology ==
The dish is known by many names, including al-hami (Note: which means hot in Algerian dialect) and valentina; spellings in English may include garantita, karantita, karane, kalantita, guarantita, kalentica, karentita, and caran. The name is derived from the Spanish word calentita or from caliente, "hot". The dish is referred to in Algeria as "the protector", a play on words in the Western Algerian dialect.

== History ==
The dish is of Hispanic-Oran origin and can also be found in France, Spain and other European countries with large Algerian populations.

It was introduced in Oran by Spanish invaders and remains a specialty of the area. According to some histories, the dish was introduced in Oran during the Ottoman siege of Oran's Spanish garrison during the 16th and 17th century Spanish occupation of Oran when dried chickpeas and chickpea flour were the only foodstuffs readily available. During the French occupation of Algeria in the 1800s, the Spanish settled in Algeria and spread the dish throughout the country.

Originally it was a poverty food but eventually became popular throughout Algerian society. According to The New Arab, the dish is an iconic Algerian street food.

== Ingredients, preparation, and serving ==
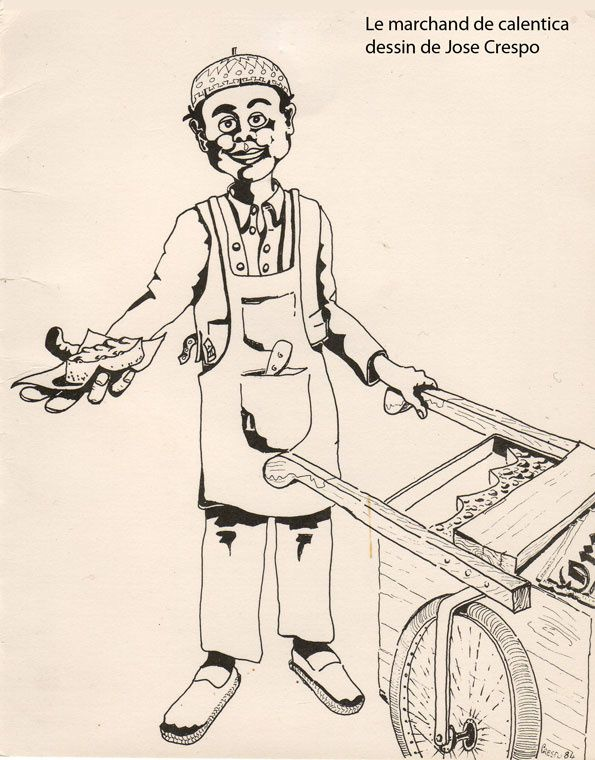
A calentica vendor in Oran

The dish is based on unroasted chickpea flour, oil, and water mixed to form a liquid batter, which is rested to hydrate the flour, topped with beaten egg and baked. It is served hot on bread or as cut slices, often with harissa and cumin. (Note: baguette is usually used as the main ingredient)

The dish is present throughout the country as a street food sold by vendors and is also made in homes and restaurants.

== Similar dishes ==
Similar dishes are found throughout the Mediterranean coast.

- Calentita, the national dish of Gibraltar
- Caliente, a Moroccan dish
- Farinata
