= Fugazza =

Argentine pizza variety

Fugazzeta
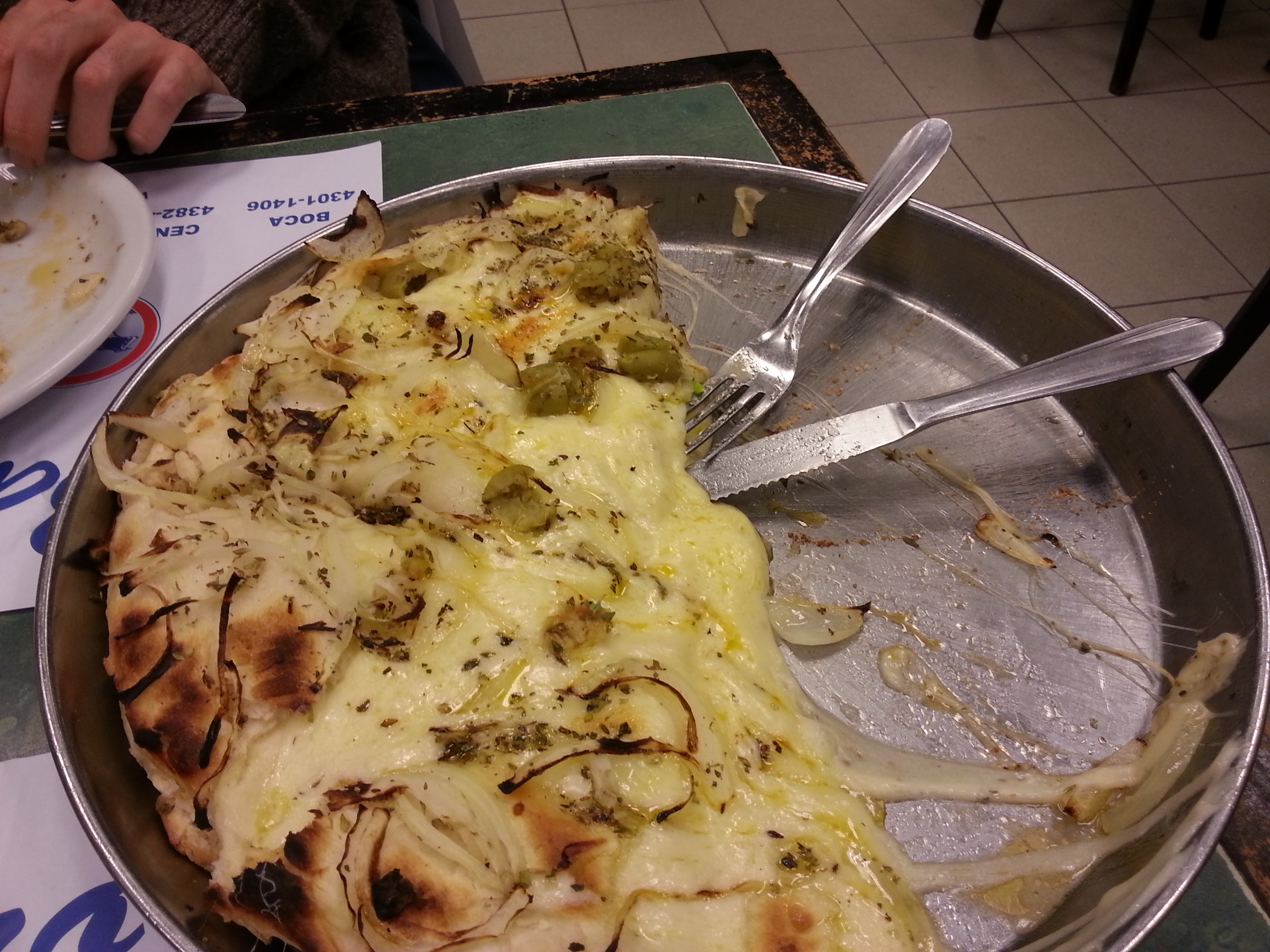
- Fugazza con queso
- Type: Flatbread
- Place of origin: Argentina
- Region or state: Buenos Aires
- Serving temperature: Hot or warm
- Main ingredients: Dough, onions, cheese

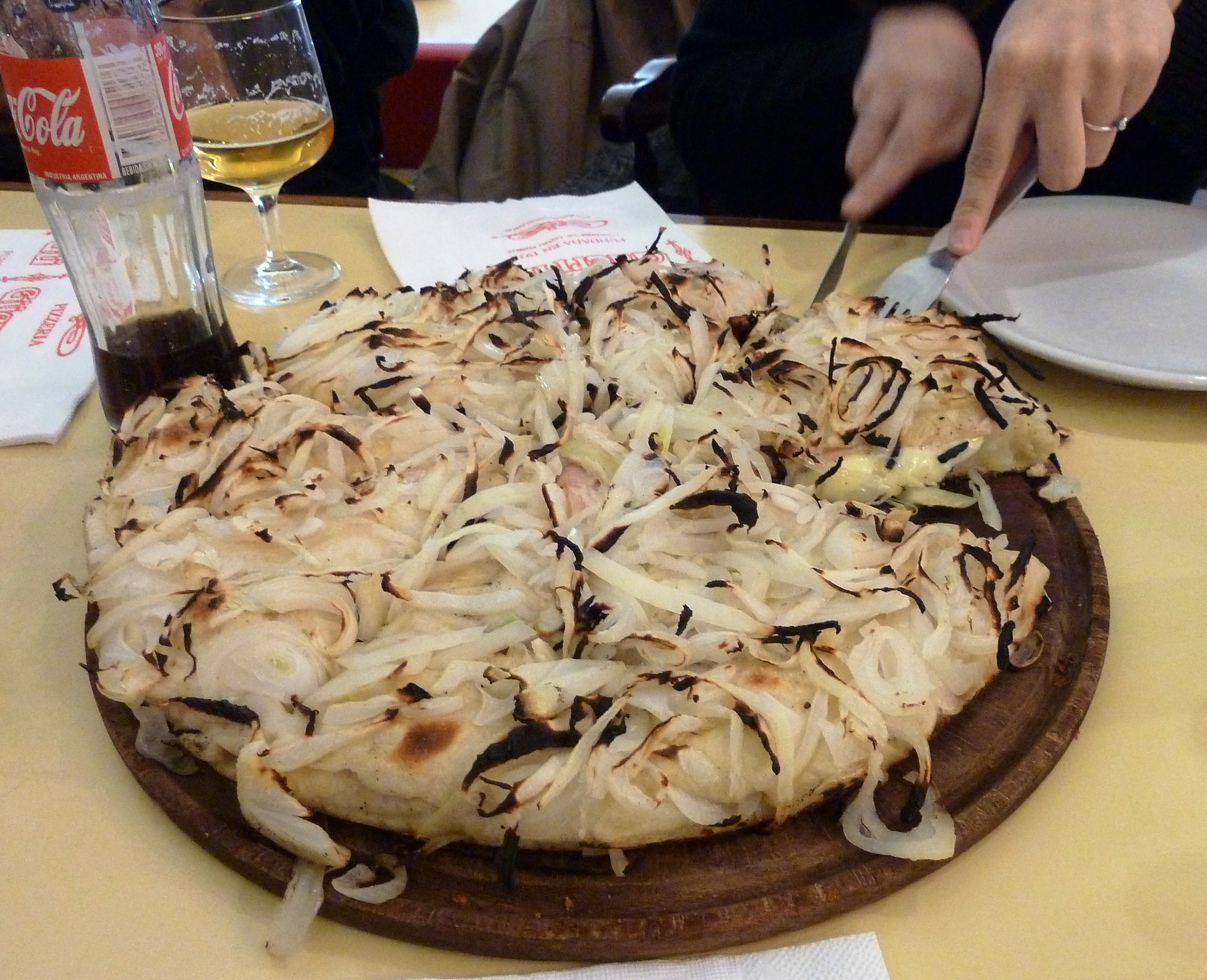
Fugazzeta

Fugazza (from Genoese fugassa) is a common type of Argentine pizza, originating in Buenos Aires, that consists of a thick pizza crust topped with onions and sometimes olives. A similar variant known as fugazza con queso or americana includes mozzarella cheese along with the aforementioned ingredients. It is derived from a combination of Neapolitan pizza with Italian focaccia bread, which in the Genoese Accent is known as Fugassa. The pizza originates from another style called pizza al molde.

== History ==
Fugazza and its variations are believed to have been invented sometime between 1893 and 1932 in the La Boca neighborhood of Buenos Aires by pizzaiolo Juan Banchero, who served it out of a pizza shop bearing his name.

Banchero's father, Agustín Banchero, was originally from Genoa and settled in the La Boca, where he opened a bakery named "Riachuelo" in 1893. There, his son Juan created the fugazza.

In 1932, Juan and his sons opened up the first pizza restaurant named Banchero. Due to the popularity of their fugazza, Juan Banchero was named “Emperor of the Fugaza con Queso” by the Republic of La Boca, a cultural association of the neighborhood.

== Characteristics and varieties ==
Fugazza is typically prepared with the following ingredients:

- Argentine pizza dough ("masa"—meaning at least three focaccia-like centimetres when served, or the more moderate "half-dough"—"media masa"), characterized by a spongy consistency, and far more water and leavening than a Neapolitan pizza crust
- low-moisture cow's milk mozzarella
- white onions
- green onion
- sweet onions
- oregano
- Parmesan cheese
- olive oil

Fugazzetta is a variation on fugazza in which the cheese is cuartirolo instead of mozzarella, is baked in between two pizza crusts (usually media masa), and the onions are placed on top.

Figazza is a version of fugazza from Uruguay, where the main difference is the lack of cheese or any middle filling. The portions are cut to the style of Uruguayan pizza, which is in rectangular pieces, and it can have additional toppings of olives and bell peppers. A less common version of Uruguayan figazza is figazza con muzzarella, where mozzarella cheese is put on top of the onions, almost the same ingredients of the Argentinian fugazza but in backward order.

== See also ==
- Pizza al molde
- Pizza a la piedra
