= Pizza a la piedra =

Thin and crispy style pizza

- Type: Pizza
- Place of origin: Argentina
- Region or state: Buenos Aires
- Main ingredients: Pizza dough, sauce, cheese, toppings

Pizza a la piedra (lit. 'stone style pizza') is a thin and crispy style pizza that originates from Buenos Aires. It is the second style of pizza that was created in the city after pizza al molde.

== History ==
The pizza became popular in Buenos Aires in the mid-1970s. Unlike the traditional pizza al molde, this style was more similar to the original method of preparing pizza that was done in Italy. The pizzas used less water in the dough and needed higher temperatures in order to cook them. Many believe that the style became popular as an alternative to the pizza al molde. Where the al molde style is more bigger, thicker, and spongy, the a la pierda style is thinner and lighter in comparison. This made it a good option for people who wanted to eat pizza but wanted a lighter meal.

== See also ==
- Fugazza
