= Pizza al molde =

Type of pizza originated in Buenos Aires

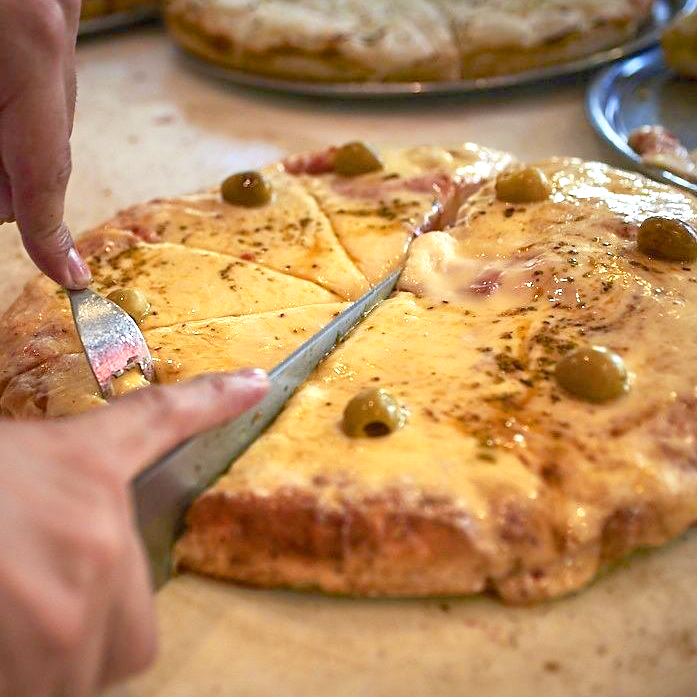
- Type: Pizza
- Place of origin: Argentina
- Region or state: Buenos Aires
- Main ingredients: Pizza dough, sauce, cheese, toppings

Pizza al molde (lit. 'pan style pizza') is a pizza that originates from Buenos Aires that has a thick and spongy crust. It is one of two major styles that originate from the city, alongside pizza a la piedra. It also inspired the creation of another style called fugazza.

== Preparation ==
The dough for the pizza is very hydrated and undergoes three rises. The pizza uses a low temperature to cook the pizza and requires only a few hours of resting.

== History ==
The pizza originates from the neighborhood of La Boca where immigrants from Italy first prepared it. When the Italian immigrants first came to Argentina, there were no special ovens that were specifically for pizza so they used ovens made for bread to make them. They also used the same pans for bread to prepare the pizza which resulted in the first pizzas al molde being rectangular instead of circular. Eventually, they started to make circular pans to copy the same shape as the pizzas in Italy.

== See also ==
- Pizza a la piedra
- Fugazza
