= Gibraltarian cuisine =

Cuisine of Gibraltar

Gibraltarian cuisine is the result of a long relationship between the people of Spanish Andalusia and those of Great Britain, as well as the many foreigners who have made Gibraltar their home over the past three centuries. These influences include those of the culinary traditions of Malta, Genoa, and Portugal. This marriage of tastes has produced in Gibraltar an eclectic mix of Mediterranean and British cuisines.

Below are some examples of typical Gibraltarian dishes.

== Pasta ==
=== Rosto ===
A popular local pasta dish of Italian origin consisting of penne in a tomato sauce with beef or occasionally pork, mushrooms and carrots (among other vegetables depending on family tradition) and topped with grated "queso bola". The origin of its name is probably from the Italian word "arrosto".

=== Fideos al horno ===
A baked pasta dish very similar to the Spanish fideos al horno, Maltese imqarrun or Greek pastitsio which consists of macaroni, bolognese sauce, and various other ingredients including egg and bacon that vary according to family tradition. The macaroni is usually topped with a layer of grated cheese or béchamel that melts during the baking process and aids in binding. Even though the dish's main ingredient is macaroni, the name fideos al horno is actually Spanish for 'baked noodles'.

== Bread ==
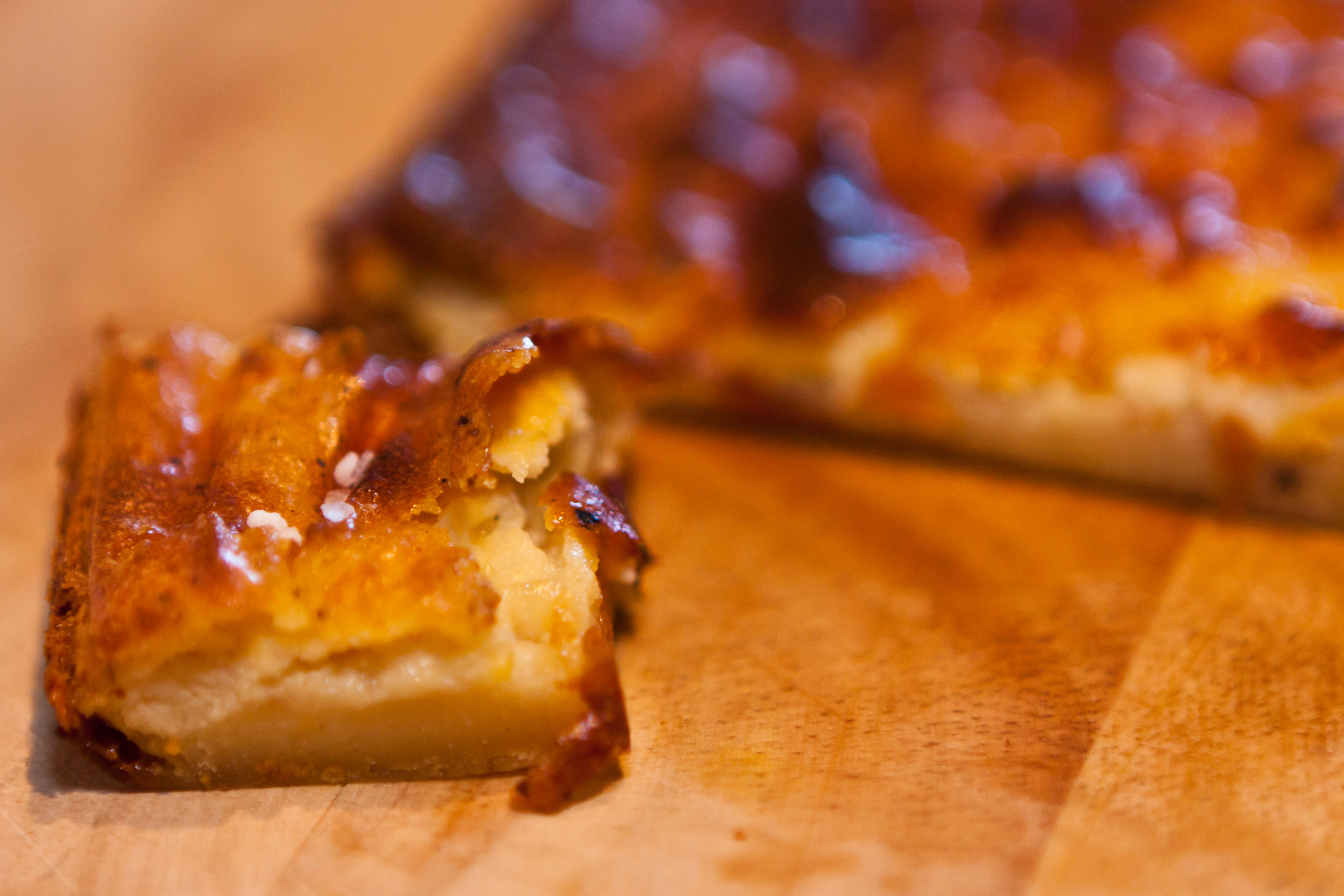
Gibraltarian calentita is very similar to the Italian farinata.

=== Savoury ===
==== Calentita ====
This is a baked pancake-like dish, similar to the Italian farinata, also known in Genoa as fainâ and in Uruguay and Argentina as fainá, and in the Nice region of France as socca. It is made with chickpea flour, water, olive oil, salt and pepper.

The word calentita is the Spanish informal diminutive of the word caliente, and means "nice and warm (or hot)".

A very similar dish is widely consumed in Algeria, where it is known as calentica, galentita or karantika. The dish has the same Spanish etymology (the diminutive -ica rather than -ita being typical of eastern Spain). According to local sources, calentita was introduced into Algeria by the Spaniards garrisoned at the port of Santa Cruz during the 16th century.

Soon after 1704, well-documented connections were established between the Barbary Coast and Gibraltar to victual the garrison, after Gibraltar lost its agricultural land. The Sephardi Jews from the Barbary Coast may have reintroduced this dish into Gibraltar, where it was maintained after the recipe was lost or fell out of favour in Spain. Another widely suggested theory is that the origin of calentita is in Genoese migrations to Gibraltar and Iberia which started before the Anglo-Dutch action of 1704, although its name makes this unlikely.

The Sephardi Jews from the Barbary Coast became major food providers for the British in Gibraltar, bringing their customs, languages and food culture. It is widely believed in Gibraltar that name may have come from street vendors who would shout "Calentita" to sell their freshly cooked wares, a word which was transferred from the temperature to the foodstuff. Indeed, the last calentita street vendor, Paloma, is still remembered locally by older people. Since the name can be traced to the 16th century during the Spanish presence in Oran, this is a false etymology.

==== Panissa ====
A bread-like dish similar to calentita. Sharing its Italian origins, it is a descendant of the Genoese dish with the same name. Unlike calentita, the ingredients are first simmered in a saucepan for over an hour, stirring constantly, to form a paste which is then left to set. When the polenta-like dough is set, it is cut into small strips and fried in olive oil.

==== Torta de acelgas ====
A Swiss chard pie very similar to the Greek spanakopita, which is usually made at Easter time.

=== Sweet ===
==== Bollo de hornazzo ====
Bollo de hornazzo is a sweet and dry bread similar to the Spanish hornazo. It is made with self-raising flour, sugar, eggs, butter or margarine and aniseed. Bollos de hornasso are eaten around Easter just as in Spain, but in Gibraltar they are also popular during Christmas. Gibraltarian hornassos can normally be distinguished from the original Spanish hornazo as they do not tend to be decorated with hard-boiled eggs (however, Gibraltarian families of Spanish descent may still decorate them in this manner). It usually glazed with beaten egg and sometimes decorated with hundreds and thousands.

==== Pan dulce ====
A sweet fruit and nut bread eaten at Christmas time. The term pan dulce means "sweet bread" in Spanish, but its origins may lie in Italy with the Genoese pandolce or Portuguese sweet bread. Its main ingredients can include lard, margarine, sugar, self-raising flour, blanched almonds, raisins, sultanas, pine nuts, candied peel, eggs, aniseed and anisette among others. It is sometimes decorated with hundreds and thousands just like the bollo de hornasso.

==== Churros and papitas ====
Churros are made in some cafeterias, and are often sold in a spiral to be taken home. Papitas are similar to churros but made with potato.

== Meat ==
=== Rolitos ===
A thin slice of beef surrounding breadcrumbs, bacon, eggs, olives, vegetables and herbs. These can be baked, fried or cooked in wine. Rolitos is another dish of Maltese origin, similar to braġjoli. It is also known as beef olives in English, even though some families prefer making them with pork or even chicken. The word rolito comes from the Spanish word rollo meaning 'roll', as the meat is rolled to hold the other ingredients inside.

== Confectionery ==
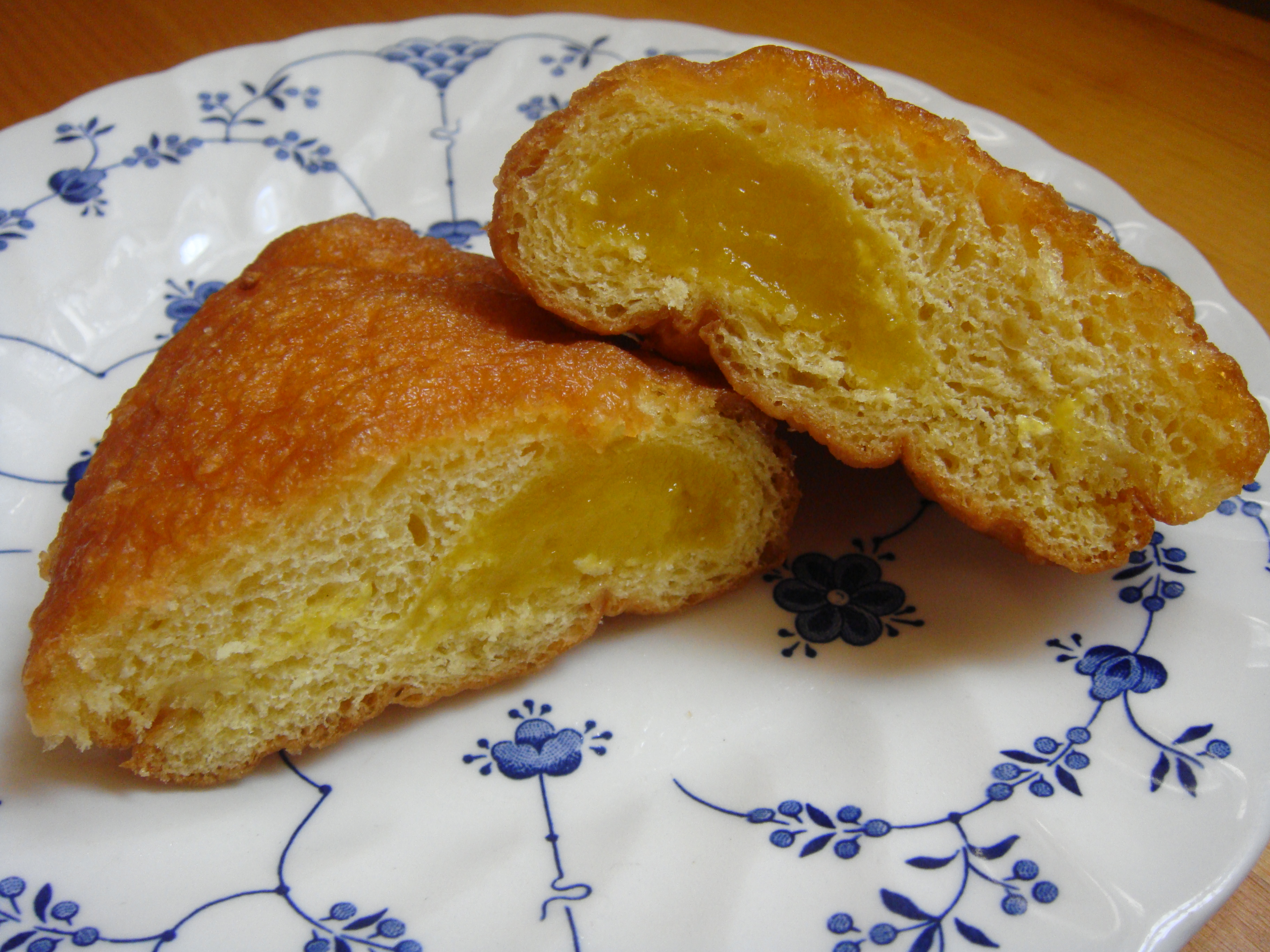
A japonesa sliced in half

=== Japonesa ===
The japonesa (English: Japanese lady) is a sweet fried doughnut filled with a custard-like cream. Japonesas are usually enjoyed at teatime or as a snack. They are traditionally coated in syrup or granulated sugar. The name is a reference to Japanese dorayaki cakes which are similarly shaped and also have a sweet filling.

== See also ==
- Andalusian cuisine
- English cuisine
- Italian cuisine
- Maltese cuisine
- Mediterranean cuisine
- Portuguese cuisine
