= Caliente (dish) =

Tangierian dish

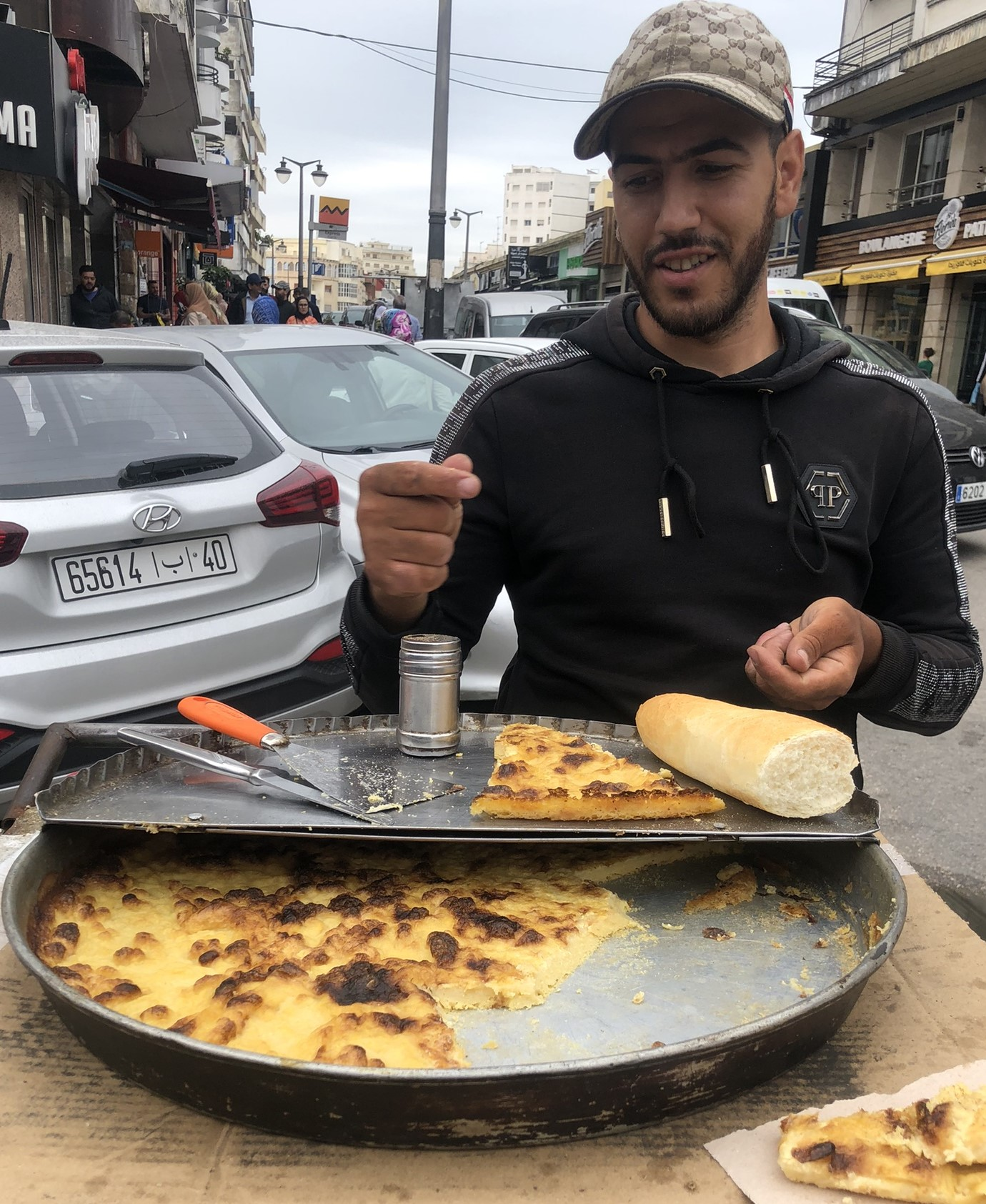
- Place of origin: Morocco
- Region or state: Tangier
- Associated cuisine: Moroccan cuisine
- Serving temperature: Hot
- Main ingredients: Chickpea flour
- Ingredients generally used: oil, eggs

Caliente, also locally known as "Kalinti" (transcribed into darija : كالينتي or كالينطي) is a street food eaten in Morocco. It is a specialty originating from the North of Morocco, exclusively Tangier. It's classified under of bread or a savory pie made from chickpea flour. The recipe contains oil, water, chickpea flour, salt, pepper and cumin. More elaborate versions may contain eggs. It is typically sold in slices by food vendors.

== Etymology ==
The name of the dish comes from the northern Judeo-Moroccan language (haketia) term caliente, meaning hot.

== Origin ==
The origins of this street food go back to Moroccans of Jewish faith in the city of Tangier. The Moroccan jews living in the old medina spoke haketia, a form of Spanish. They named the dish "caliente" because it must be served hot.

== Similaries ==
A variation of this street food exists in the city of Oujda where it is called "karan".

A similar dish exists in Gibraltar. Flavored with paprika, it has been described as one of the culinary symbols of Gibraltar by Hélène Jawhara Piñer.
