= Farinata =

Chickpea pancake

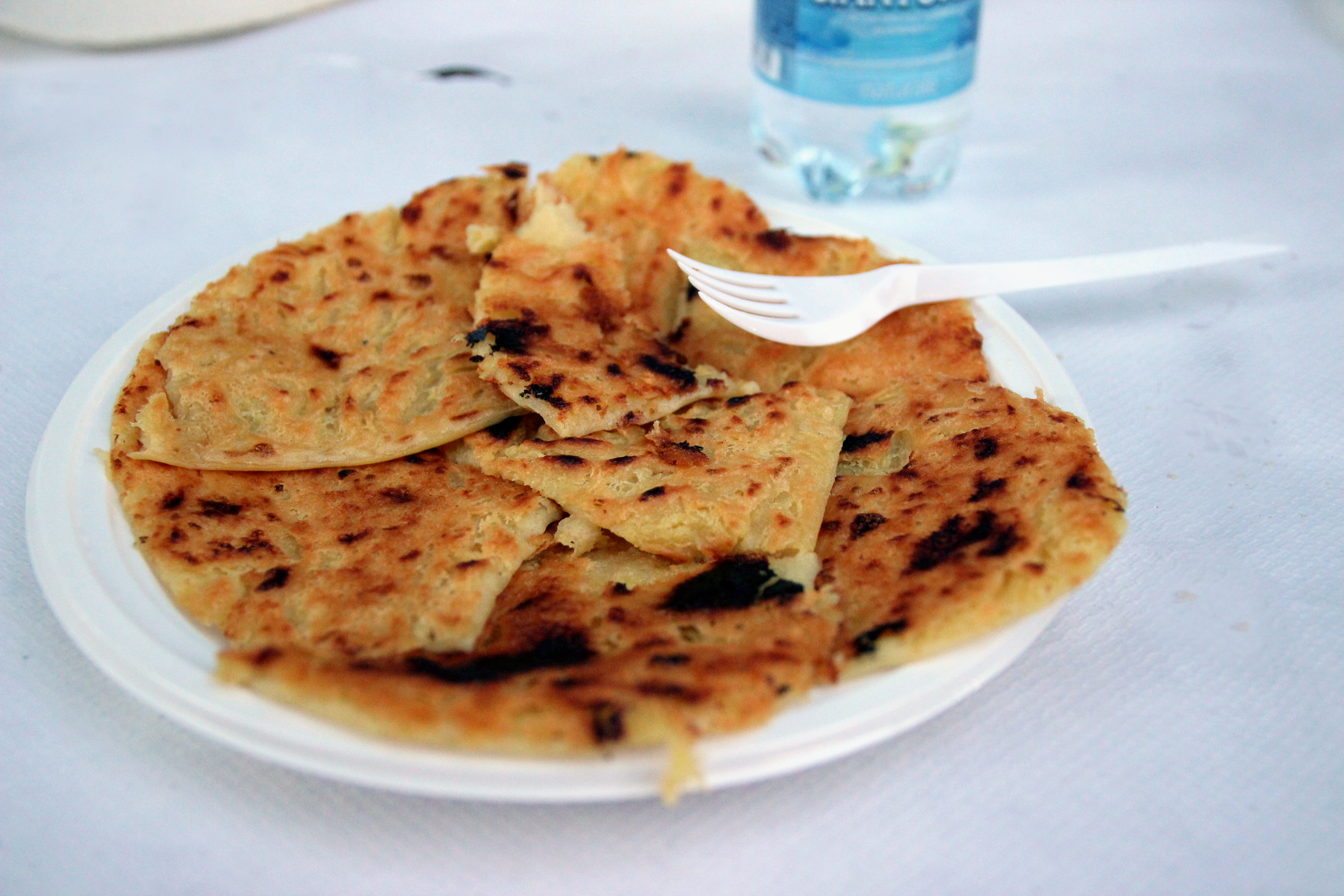
- Slices of farinata
- Alternative names: Socca, farinata di ceci
- Type: Pancake
- Place of origin: Italy; France
- Region or state: Liguria; Tuscany; Provence
- Main ingredients: Chickpea flour, water, olive oil

Farinata (Italian: [fariˈnaːta]), socca (Occitan: [suˈka]) or farinata di ceci is a type of thin, unleavened pancake or crêpe made from chickpea flour. It is considered a staple food on the northwest Mediterranean coast. In Liguria it is named farinata, in Nice socca and in Toulon cade. It is a speciality of Oran, Algeria, where it was introduced under French rule and known as calentica, and in the cities of Buenos Aires, Argentina, and Montevideo, Uruguay, where it is known as fainá and eaten with pizza.

== Names ==
In standard Italian, the dish is called farinata ('made of flour'), while in Ligurian, specifically in the Genoese dialect, it goes by the name of fainâ (Ligurian: [fajˈnaː]); in Carrara and in Massa it is called calda calda (lit. 'hot hot'), in the rest of Tuscany cecina or torta di ceci (lit. 'chickpea pie') and in Sardinia fainé.

In Nice and the Alpes-Maritimes it is called socca, and in the Var, especially in Toulon, it is known as cade, from Occitan pascade, as it was traditionally served during Easter (Pascas in Occitan).

Names of farinata around the Western Mediterranean Sea

== History ==
The origin of the dish is unknown. One legend says it was invented by a group of Roman soldiers who roasted chickpea-flour on a shield. Farinata is a contemporary street food in Liguria.

== Cooking method ==
Farinata is made by stirring chickpea flour into a mixture of water and olive oil to form a loose batter, pouring it into a pan to make a pancake typically 4 mm thick, and cooking it for a few minutes, traditionally in an open oven in a tin-plated copper baking-pan. It may be seasoned with fresh rosemary, pepper and sea salt. Traditionally farinata is cut into irregularly shaped triangular slices, and eaten (with no toppings) on small plates with optional black pepper. Elsewhere in Italy—traditionally in Tuscany, where it is called cecina (from the Italian word for 'chickpeas', ceci)—it is served stuffed into small focaccia (mainly in Pisa) or between two slices of bread, as it is traditional in Livorno. It is usually both vegan and gluten-free.

== Regional distribution ==
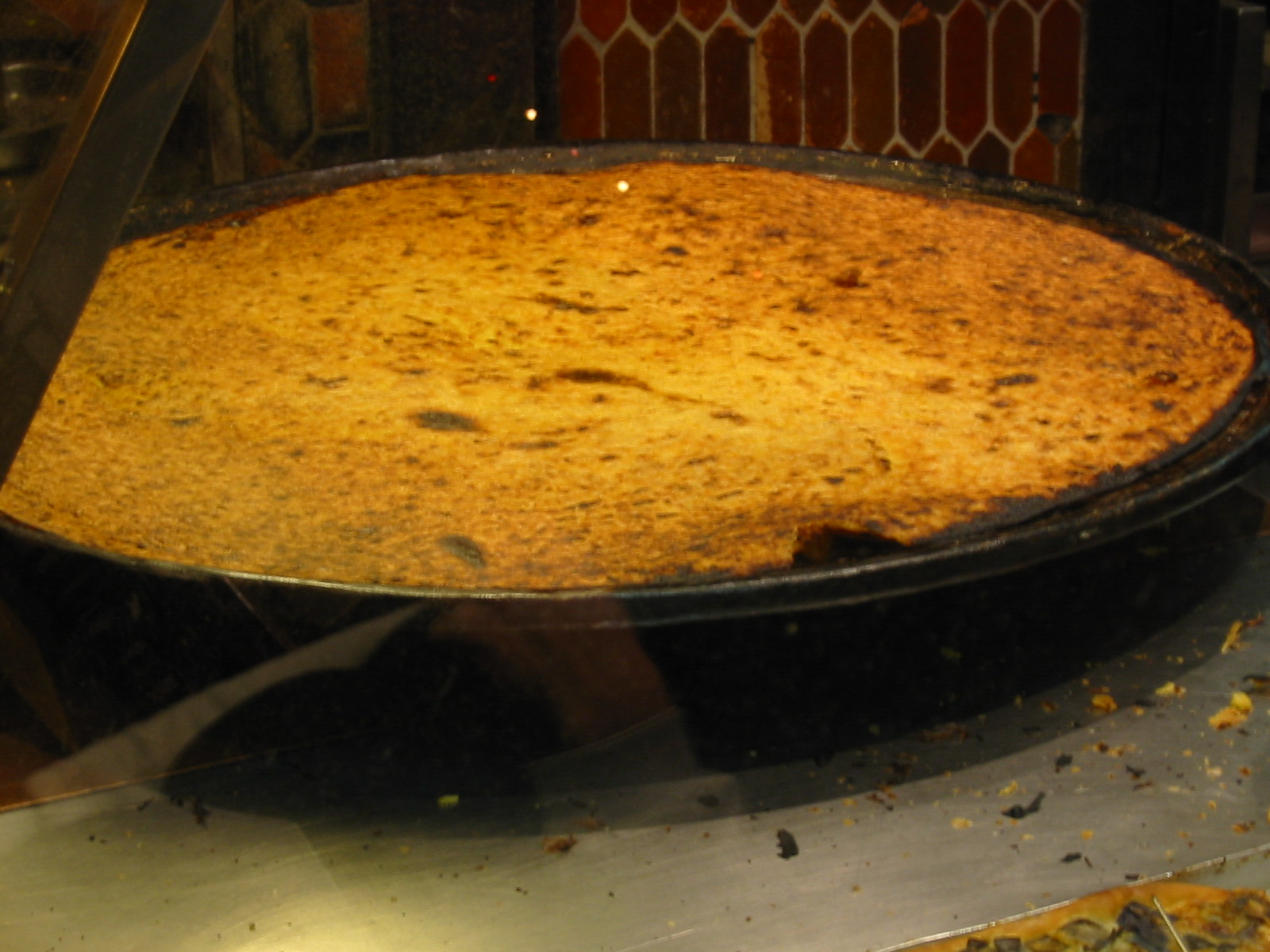
Socca of Nice, also known as La Cade in Toulon

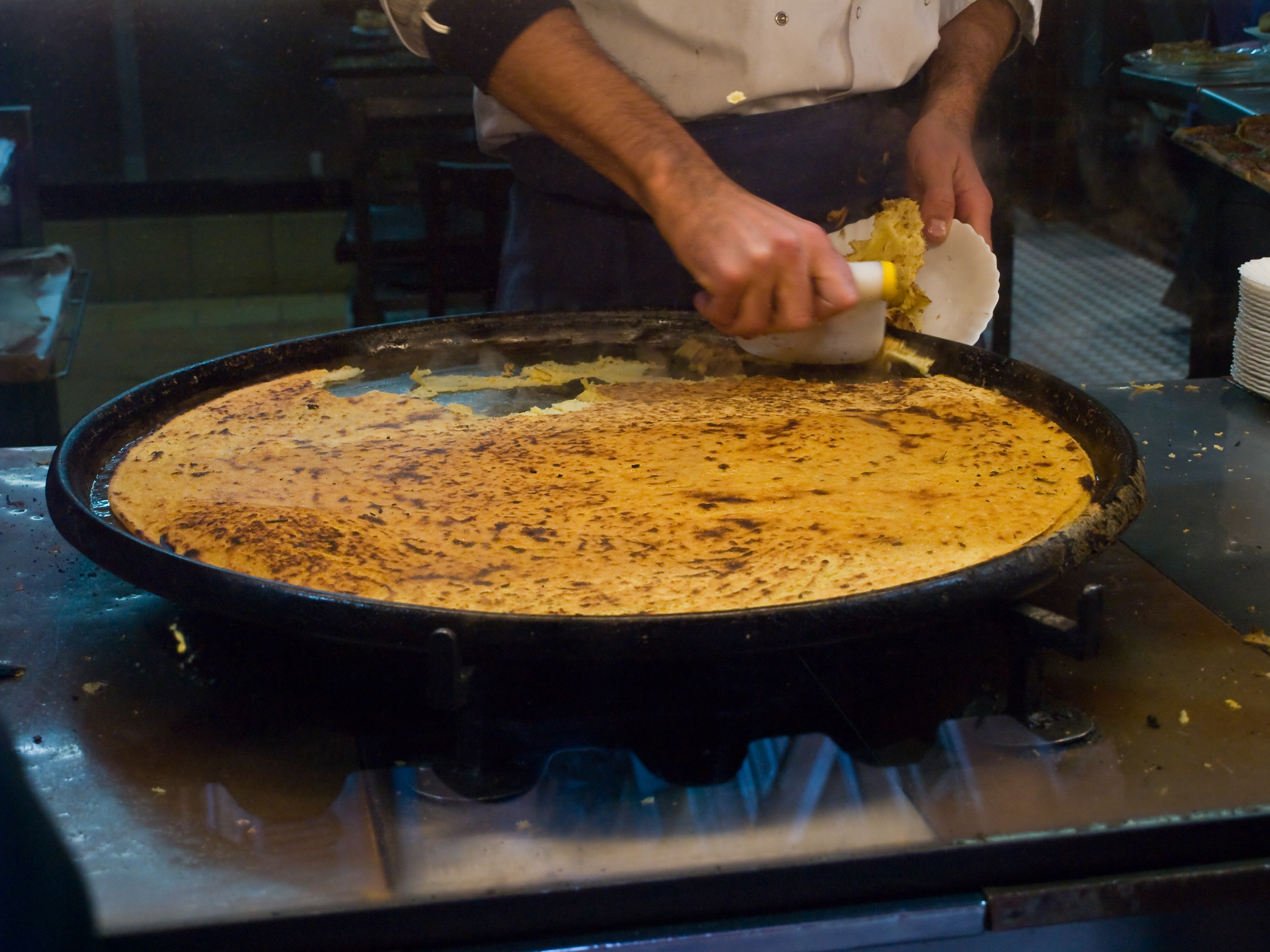
Socca, just coming out of the oven, in the old town of Nice

Socca is a dish of southeastern French cuisine, in and around the city of Nice. It is the same as farinata, although some say the texture is a bit different. It may be baked on a tinned copper plate more than a metre in diameter. Around Toulon and Marseille, farinata can be found under the name cade.

In Algeria, karantika is a similar dish. It is served hot and dressed with cumin and harissa.

In Argentina and Uruguay (where many thousands of Ligurian people emigrated between the 19th and the 20th centuries), farinata is known as fainá, similar to the original Genoese name fainâ. It is very popular and often eaten on top of pizza (a caballo).

In Uruguay el fainá, called la fainá in Argentina, is considered a traditional dish, brought by immigrants in 1915. 27th August has been called "Fainá Day". Fainá is optionally served de orillo or del medio, which means from the border and from the center, because slightly irregular baking is made from to the meniscus of the liquid dough, making it thicker at the center, resulting different textures, more creamy or more crispy akin to the choice.

In Gibraltar, it is known as calentita when it is baked or panissa when it is fried. They are typically eaten plain, without any toppings. These are considered to be Gibraltar's national dishes.

== See also ==
- Cuisine of Liguria
- Cuisine of Provence
- List of pancakes
