= Water pollution in the Canterbury Region =

Overview of the water pollution in Canterbury, New Zealand

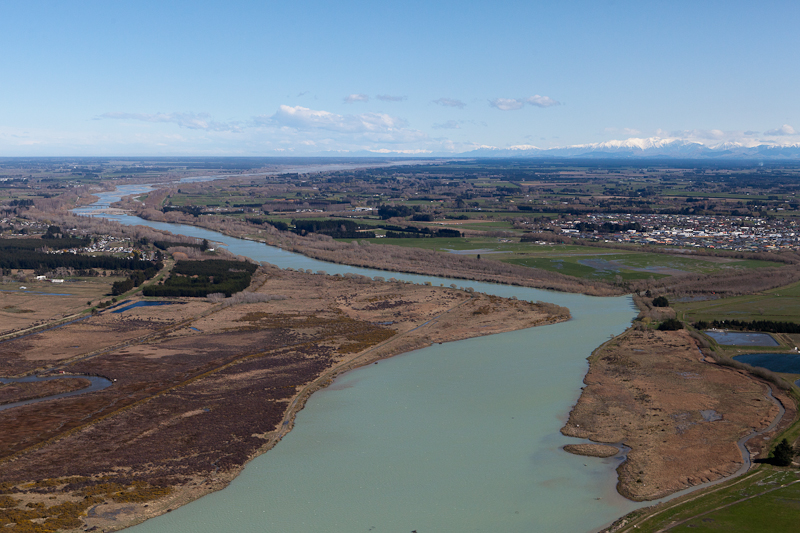
Waimakariri River, the main contributor to the aquifers which feed the water supply for Christchurch.

Water pollution in Canterbury, New Zealand has become a major environmental issue, largely due to pollution from agricultural sources. Most of the region's drinking water is sourced from groundwater via aquifers. Groundwater pollution has increased in the region following the expansion of irrigation and dairy farming since the 1990's. Research has shown that Canterbury has the largest percentage of high groundwater nitrates in the country. Nitrate exposure has been found to be associated with an increased risk of colorectal cancer. The Canterbury Regional Council (Environment Canterbury) declared a 'nitrate emergency' in 2025.

The use of water for irrigation, and the discharge of nutrients, requires a resource consent. Water resources are managed by Environment Canterbury through the Canterbury Strategic Water Strategy, under the Resource Management Act.

== Background ==
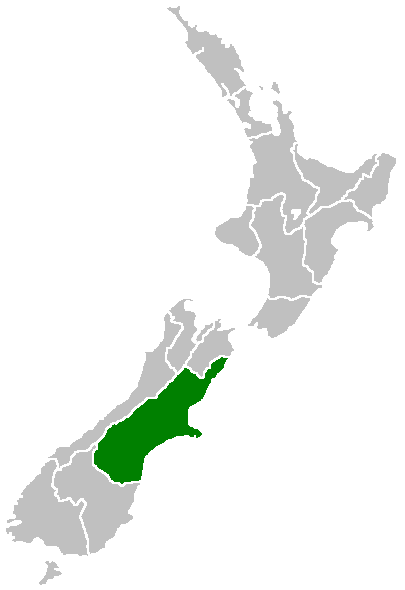
The Canterbury Region is in the South Island of New Zealand.

Due to the rain shadow created by the Southern Alps, rainfall in Canterbury is relatively low compared to the rest of the country. The inland basins of the Mackenzie Country are some of the driest areas of New Zealand, with annual rainfall totals of below 500mm — approximately ten times less than the rainfall in nearby high elevation locations. Water from melting snow and ice and from rainfall drain into the predominantly braided rivers on the Canterbury Plains. The municipal water supply for Christchurch, the most populous part of the region, is sourced from the aquifers beneath the city. Water enters these groundwater aquifers, which provide drinking water for Christchurch, from the Waimakariri River, rainfall, and irrigation.

For much of the 20th century, land in Canterbury was considered to be too dry for dairy farming, and was primarily used to farm sheep and crops. However, the development of irrigation made dairy a more economically viable option, and dairy farming in the region took off in the 1990's. Water for irrigation is largely drawn from rivers and groundwater. Between 2002 and 2022, the amount of irrigated agricultural land in New Zealand almost doubled, from 383,000 hectares to 762,000 hectares. The number of cows in Canterbury increased from 113,000 in 1990, to 1.2 million in 2022.

Alongside irrigation, escalation in use of synthetic fertilisers contributed to the growth of the industry. Between 1990 and 2015, the national use of nitrogen fertiliser increased by 627%. Groundwater pollution has become an issue throughout the area, due to nitrate from cattle urine and synthetic fertilisers entering groundwater supplies. Nitrate is one of the top drinking water contaminants in New Zealand. While drinking water supplies owned by local councils are monitored for nitrates and are almost always below the maximum allowed level, in rural areas many people rely on private water bores, and draw their own drinking water supplies from groundwater. Private water supplies for less than 25 people are not required to test for contaminants.

== Risks ==
Canterbury has the largest percentage of high groundwater nitrates in New Zealand. Most of the region's drinking water comes from groundwater. New Zealand's maximum acceptable value for nitrate‑nitrogen in drinking water is 11.3 mg per litre (equivalent to 50 mg/L as nitrate), however recent studies have suggested that levels above 5 mg per litre can harm pregnancies and cause cancer.

International studies have linked nitrate-nitrogen levels above 5 mg per litre to low birth weight and pre-term birth. A study of 1.4 million births found that exposure to levels above 5 mg per litre increased the likelihood of a preterm birth (20-31 weeks) by 47%. There is also risk to infants, as nitrate exposure can impact the body's ability to carry oxygen in the bloodstream, leading to a risk of blue baby syndrome. In 2021, the New Zealand College of Midwives advised that alternative water sources should be used for pregnant people and bottle feeding infants in areas with drinking water that exceeds 5 mg per litre. As of 2021, there were 138,000 New Zealanders drinking water with nitrates at 5 mg per litre or above.

Correlations between nitrate exposure and increased risk of colorectal cancer have been observed. An analysis of 1.7 million individuals found increased risks at drinking water with nitrate levels above 3.87 mg per litre. Research undertaken in 2021 found that around 800,000 New Zealand residents are drinking water with nitrate levels that can increase the risk of getting colorectal cancer. It is estimated that nitrate contamination of drinking water is responsible for up to 100 cases of bowel cancer and 40 deaths each year. New Zealand has one of the highest rates of bowel cancer in the world. The country's rates of early onset colorectal cancer have been increasing by an average of 26% every ten years, disproportionately affecting Māori.

== Water quality issues ==
=== Groundwater ===
High levels of nitrates and E. coli have been identified in rivers and groundwater across Canterbury. A 2025 study identified dairy effluent as a primary cause of the high nitrate levels found in these groundwaters. This is largely due to the use of nitrogen fertilisers, which enter rivers and streams via surface runoff, or the transport of the nitrogen through the grass consumed by cattle and excreted through urine, which then enters groundwater. It has been estimated that 79% of the nitrogen which dairy cows consume is returned to the ground through waste.

Following the expansion of the dairy industry, nitrate leaching has also significantly increased in New Zealand since 1990. The risk of Canterbury exceeding the maximum acceptable value for nitrate was predicted by a 2015 Environment Canterbury report, based on modelling of land use change in the region. Growth of the dairy industry in Canterbury has continued, with dairy conversions amounting to 15,000 new cows were approved in the first six months of 2025.

In a study that tested over 2,400 rural drinking water supplies between 2022 and 2024, the maximum acceptable value was exceeded in 6.8% of rural samples from Canterbury, while 43.1% of samples exceeded 5 mg per litre. A study published in 2022, found that nitrate exposure for New Zealanders was within internationally-established acceptable intake levels, however the study was criticised by other academics for being largely funded by Fonterra.

A 2024 groundwater survey led by Environment Canterbury, which took samples from 349 wells across Canterbury, found that 62% of the long-term sites had increasing nitrate trends, and 10% of wells exceeded the nitrate maximum acceptable value for drinking water. The survey also found E. Coli present in 14% of the wells. The results from the subsequent 2025 survey showed similar nitrate levels, though the detection of E. Coli was lower.

=== Recreational sites ===
A report published by the Ministry for the Environment in 2023 identified Ashburton Lakes as being at risk of eutrophication, as protection of the lakes from the impacts of surrounding land use had been insufficient.

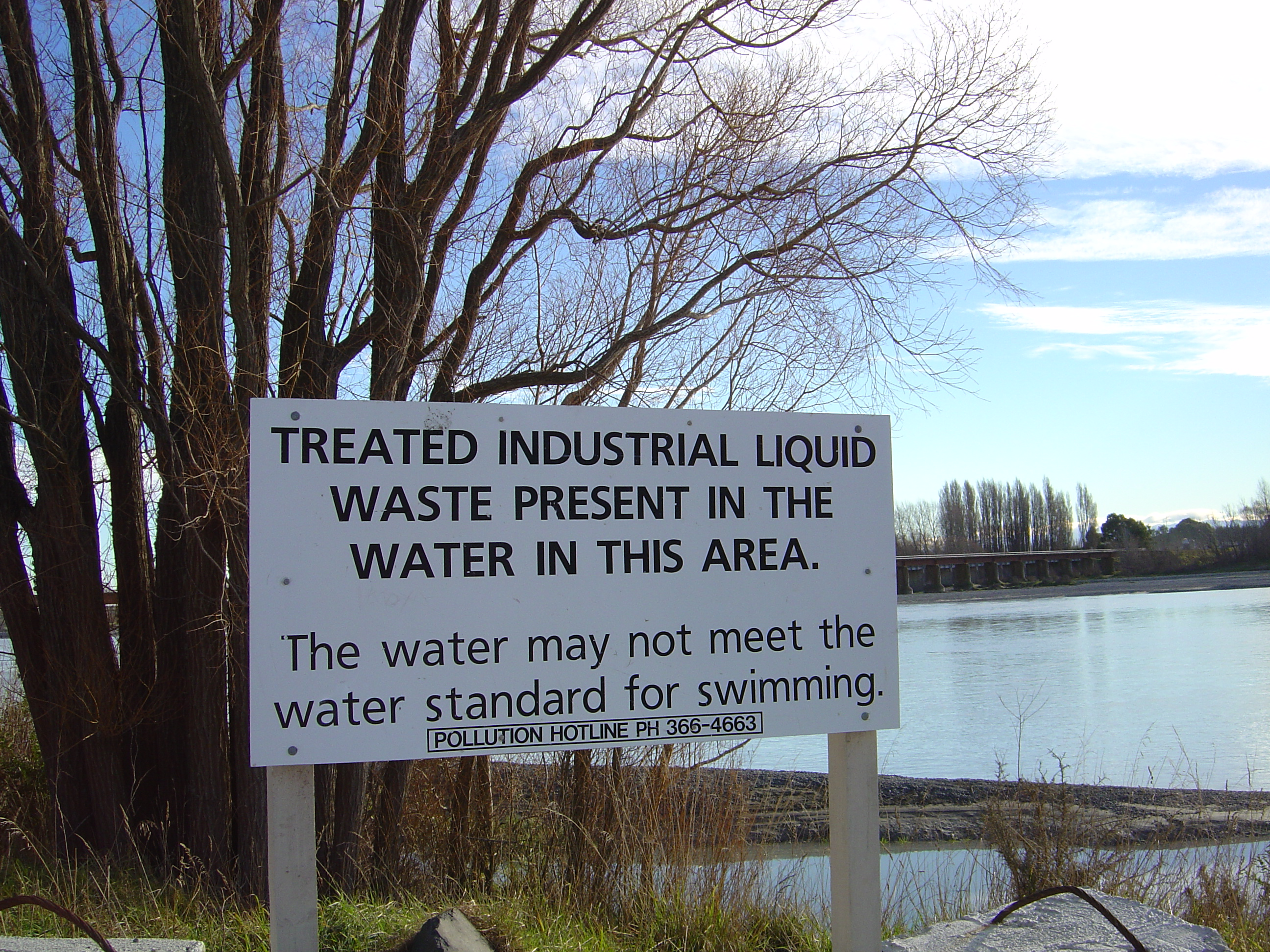
A water pollution sign on the Waimakariri River in 2004.

Monthly monitoring occurs at urban sites in rivers and streams which flow through the city of Christchurch. Results from 2021 showed that 45% of monitoring sites have poor water quality.

Popular recreational sites across Canterbury have E. Coli concentrations monitored over the summer; 52 freshwater (rivers and lakes) and 47 coastal (estuary, beach, and harbour). During the 2024–2025 summertime, 77% of all monitored sites were considered suitable for contact recreation, while 23% were considered unsuitable.

=== Contamination incidents ===
In September 2025, several visitors on a school trip to a North Canterbury campground contracted E. coli, and six members of the group were hospitalised. In August 2026, it was revealed that a school in Canterbury had shut off their water 18 months earlier and were shipping in their water supply, due to a test result in February 2025 which showed nitrate levels exceeding the legal limit.

Multiple boil water notices and do-not-drink water notices have been issued around the region due to contamination, including:

- The town of Cheviot was on a boil water notice for several years between 2004 and 2010.
- Around 2,000 households in Christchurch had to boil water for use in 2019 due to E. coli levels.
- In November 2021, Geraldine was placed under a boil water notice for multiple days.
- In August 2022, Waimate District Council informed residents that the water supply for residents in Waihao and Waikakahi East would be cut off, as it had breached the maximum acceptable values of 11.3 mg per litre for nitrate-nitrogen. The water supply was reinstated four months later, when levels had dropped to 8.6 mg per litre.
- In late 2024, a do-not-drink notice was issued in Waimate due nitrate levels which exceeded acceptable values. Levels were observed to be rising again in December 2025.

== Response ==
A high profile campaign on "dirty dairying" run by Fish & Game New Zealand in 2002 highlighted the damage being caused to the health of New Zealand's freshwater environment, from the intensification of dairy farming. The Dairying and Clean Streams Accord was established in 2003 by Fonterra and a number of government agencies as a means of reducing nonpoint source pollution, however it has been criticised for not achieving its goals.

Approvals for the development of new irrigation projects slowed in the early 2000's. A large number of resource consent applications for intensive dairy farming in the Mackenzie Basin attracted opposition in 2009, due in part to the potential effects on water quality.

In 2010, then Environment Minister Nick Smith dismissed all the elected councillors at Environment Canterbury and replaced them with government-appointed commissioners, citing concerns about their performance. This was then shifted to a mixed governance model in 2015, consisting of seven elected members and six appointed commissioners. The model returned to a completely democratically-elected council in 2019.

In 2014, construction began on the Central Plains Water scheme, drawing water from the Rakaia River to irrigate around 60,000 hectares of farmland. The scheme is now the South Island’s largest irrigation company.

Environment Canterbury requires farms in the region to have Farm Environment Plans based on their land use, water use, and effluent discharge. Farm Environment Plans identify the environmental risks on each farm and the requirements for managing and mitigating those risks.

A groundwater survey in 2024, which analysed trends over a 10-year period found that water quality is yet to show improvements. Of the 301 wells sampled, 62% had increasing nitrate concentrations, 18% showed no change, while 20% had decreasing nitrate concentrations. E. coli was detected in 14% of samples, an increase from 9% in 2023.

=== 2025–2026 nitrate emergency declaration ===
In September 2025, Environment Canterbury voted to declare a nitrate emergency, after their annual groundwater survey had identified that both nitrate and E. coli concentrations were increasing in 62% of sample locations. Water samples were taken from 349 wells across the region, with data collected from a mix of private domestic and irrigation supply wells, community water supply wells, industrial supply wells, and purpose-built monitoring wells. At the time, the presence of E. coli was detected in around 14% of these wells, and around 10% of wells were found to have nitrate-nitrogen levels above the maximum acceptable value for drinking water. On 23 September 2026, a notice of motion was passed (nine votes for and seven votes against) directing Environment Canterbury to discontinue the nitrate emergency declaration and to cease further investigation into funding mechanisms for treatment of private drinking water supplies for nitrate contamination.

== Prosecutions ==
Multiple prosecutions have been made for causing water pollution in the region.

- In 2009, Philip Curry was fined $5,000 after pleading guilty to discharging effluent onto land that may have resulted in contaminants entering nearby Barry's Bay Stream.
- In 2009, Corlette Holdings was fined $10,000 after pleading guilty to two charges of discharging effluent from an irrigator resulted in ponding and a second charge of effluent being discharged, which may have resulted in contaminated water.
- In 2010, a prosecution against Brook Farms and Mosbro Farms in Ashburton was withdrawn after they agreed to mitigate the effects of the effluent discharge.
- In 2012, Springston dairy farm company, White Gold Ltd, was fined a record $90,000 after illegally discharging 45,000 litres of diluted dairy effluent over a three-day period in 2010. The public reported the dairy effluent flowing into waterways that flowed into Lake Ellesmere / Te Waihora.
- In 2022, Alliance Smithfield meat plant was fined $57,000 after being prosecuted by Environment Canterbury for unlawfully contaminated discharge to land and then to sea near Washdyke Lagoon.
- In 2024, the High Court of New Zealand ruled that Environment Canterbury had unlawfully granted resource consent for the discharge of nitrogen and other contaminants to Ashburton Lyndhurst Irrigation Ltd. The consent covered an area of 177,000 hectares, and allowed for the release of nitrogen onto land where it could then enter nearby waterways, such as the Ashburton River / Hakatere.

== See also ==
- Canterbury Water Management Strategy
- Water pollution in New Zealand
- Water in New Zealand
- Environment of New Zealand
- Agriculture in New Zealand
