= Water pollution in New Zealand =

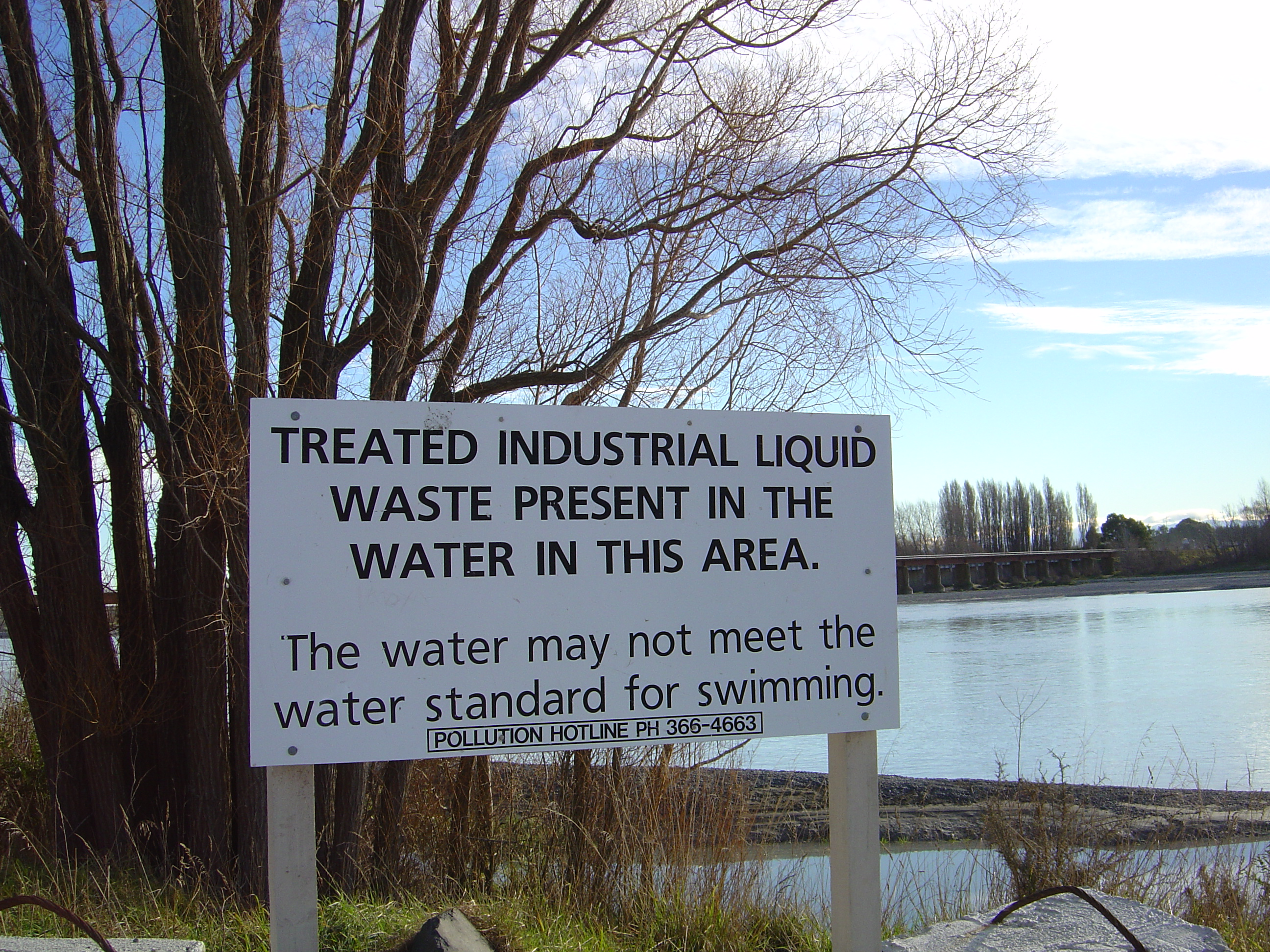
A sign warning of water pollution on the Waimakariri River, 2004

Water pollution in New Zealand is an increasing concern for those who use and care for waterways and for New Zealand regulatory bodies. An increase in population is linked to an increase in water pollution, due to a range of causes such as rural land use, industrial use and urban development. Fresh water quality is under pressure from agriculture, hydropower, urban development, pest invasions and climate change. While pollution from point sources has been reduced, diffuse pollution such as nutrients, pathogens and sediments development and from stormwater in towns is not under control. There are more than 800 water quality monitoring sites around New Zealand that are regularly sampled.

== Water quality monitoring ==
Guideline standards for water quality are published by MfE.

e.coli / 100ml	
< 130	no calculated risk level
131–260	above NCRL
261–550	substantial elevation of Campylobactor infection
> 550	above level of significant risk of infection

In 2018, waterways across New Zealand have been showing improvements across a number of water quality measures, as monitored by LAWA data. As of January 2019, Auckland is the region with New Zealand's most polluted waterways, with 62% of rivers and lakes graded poor by the Ministry for the Environment for swimming, and 0% of rivers and lakes graded as good.

Monitoring between 2020 and 2024 showed that more than half of rivers have signs of organic pollution and nutrient enrichment, and 54% of New Zealand’s river length had macroinvertebrate communities which indicate moderate or severe organic pollution or nutrient enrichment. Many rivers are unsuitable for recreation based on E. coli levels, and 44% of total river length is not suitable for activities like swimming due to the risk of Campylobacter infection.

== Water pollution by sector ==
=== Agriculture ===
Agriculture is a major use of lowland areas of New Zealand and has affected water quality. The expansion of intensive dairy production has resulted in greater levels of nitrogen in soil, surface and groundwater.

In 1993, the National Institute of Water and Atmospheric Research summarised available data on the quality of water in rivers. They concluded that "Some lowland river reaches in agriculturally developed catchments are in poor condition" reflecting "agriculturally derived diffuse and point source waste inputs in isolation or in addition to urban or industrial waste inputs". The key contaminants identified in lowland rivers were dissolved inorganic nitrogen, dissolved reactive phosphorus, sediment and coliforms. Small streams in some dairy farming areas such as the Waikato and Canterbury were identified as being in relatively poor condition.

Sediment from erosion of hills and river banks is also a source of pollution of waters. The sediments loading from high intensity, increasing frequency storm and high rainfall events has led to millions of tonnes of sediment changing fluvial systems in NZ waterways. This sediment contains high organic contents from forest litter which is changing sedimentation patterns and increasing organic bed loads and deposition in NZ lakes and shallow coastal waters.

Since 2005 increased dairy farming rates of grazing animals have outstripped riparian planting and the ability of some Regional Councils to manage and mitigate impacts on the quality of water, and there is some evidence of urea use leading to nitrogen levels in waterways. Horticulture, arable farming and plantation forestry generally have less effect than dairy farming.

In 2001 Fish and Game New Zealand started the high-profile dirty dairying campaign to highlight the effect of pollution from farming intensification on the ecological health of freshwater environments. As a reaction to this campaign Fonterra, the largest dairy company in New Zealand, along with a number of government agencies instigated the Dairying and Clean Streams Accord to address water pollution due to dairy farming. The aim of the Accord is to limit the access of stock to waterways. Fonterra exports the majority of its produce, and encourages farmers to limit environmental impacts as a method of getting environmentally aware consumers to purchase their products. The increase in research into sustainable farming and reducing fertilizer use, increasing the planting of native shrubs, grasses, flaxes and trees along the margins of streams. These techniques help intercept run off of manure, sediments and fertilizer and use them to enhance growth of the planted zones.

Fencing off streams and riparian planting has been shown to improve water quality, though this is more effective at reducing pollution from surface runoff (such as from phosphorus) rather than contaminants such as nitrogen which reach the waterway by seeping through the soil. Fencing prevent stock from depositing feces directly into waterways and trampling the banks; planting reduces surface runoff. One study of fencing a waterway on a deer farm reduced contaminants, including the indicator bacterium E. coli, by 55–84%, but nitrate concentrations doubled, and suspended sediment was increased from animals creating tracks along the fences.

Over the past decade, regional councils have increasingly imposed more regulatory requirements on farmers to reduce their environmental impacts. A number of councils – including Environment Canterbury, Horizons Regional Council and Hawke's Bay Regional Council require most farms to have Farm Environment Plans in place, with some farms in Otago and Waikato also required to have Farm Environment Plans in place. The plans require farmers to manage environmental risks around activities such as farm dairy effluent, erosion, discharges into waterways (through planting and fencing intensively stocked areas), irrigation and the application of nutrients. Some councils have also imposed nutrient limits on farmers.

In 2016, a controversial video by Greenpeace highlighted the contribution of dairy farming to river pollution, stating that over 60 percent of monitored rivers are unsafe to swim in. This video advertisement was appealed by DairyNZ, but the Advertising Standards Authority found in favour of Greenpeace.

The changes to introduce stricter environmental controls on farmers have been cited as contributing to recent trends showing waterway improvements by Horizons Regional Council and Environment Canterbury. They have also been cited as contributing to analysis completed by the Cawthorne Institute showing waterway quality is now improving for many water quality measures based on an analysis of LAWA sites.

==== Nitrate contamination ====
Nitrate is one of the top drinking water contaminants in New Zealand. Groundwater pollution occurs due to nitrate from cattle urine and synthetic fertilisers entering groundwater supplies. New Zealand's maximum acceptable value for nitrate‑nitrogen in drinking water is 11.3mg per litre (equivalent to 50 mg/L as nitrate), however studies have suggested that levels above 5mg per litre can harm pregnancies and cause cancer. One study published in 2026, which assessed over 730,000 births across New Zealand, identified a connection between higher nitrate concentrations in drinking water and increased risk of preterm birth. The study compared birth records between 2008–2021 with the nitrate levels in the area the mother was living. The increased risk was observed at concentrations that are below New Zealand's drinking water standards. An international study of 1.4 million births found that exposure to levels above 5mg per litre increased the likelihood of a preterm birth.

Correlations between nitrate exposure and increased risk of colorectal cancer have also been observed. Research undertaken in 2021 found that around 800,000 New Zealand residents are drinking water with nitrate levels that can increase the risk of getting colorectal cancer. New Zealand has one of the highest rates of colorectal cancer in the world. The country's rates of early onset colorectal cancer have been increasing by an average of 26% every ten years, disproportionately affecting Māori. In 2026 it was revealed that 21 schools, largely in Canterbury and Waikato, had drinking water with nitrate contamination that exceeded this level. Of these, five schools exceeded the legal limit of 11.3mg per litre, with two reaching 17mg per litre.

=== Domestic ===
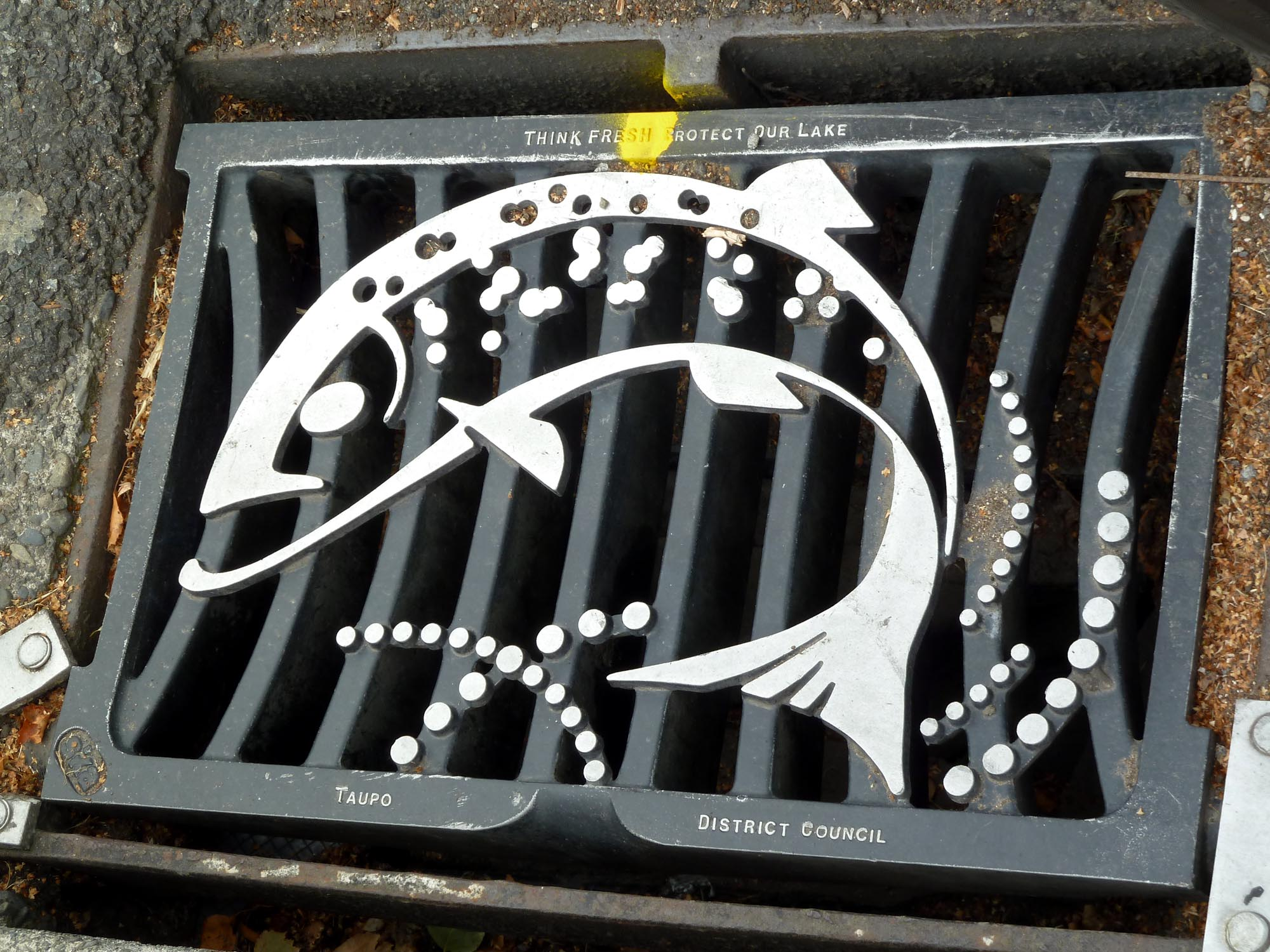
Surface water drain cover in Taupō showing advisory fish symbol

Urban runoff is polluted with detergents, waste oil, litter and fecal matter. Some stormwater drains have a fish logo painted on the curb to highlight stormwater pollution.

=== Industry ===
Industrial processing frequently involves the discharge of process waste-water to waterways. For example, Fonterra has been discharging wastewater containing milk condensate into the Tui River, a tributary of the Mangatainoka River, and is applying for resource consents to continue doing so. The Tasman Pulp and Paper Mill, now owned by Norske Skog, has been discharging waste into the Tarawera River since 1955.

=== Recreation ===
High numbers of visitors to parks and other areas where there are no toilets is increasing the chance of pollution from human waste. In alpine areas, where anaerobic digestion of faecal matter is slow, the Department of Conservation have sewage holding tanks on the toilets at backcountry huts. The sewage is flown out by helicopter for treatment elsewhere. Freedom camping, a popular activity in some areas, is suspected of causing water pollution due to the incorrect disposal of human waste.

=== Urban areas ===
The most significant source of water pollution in urban areas is due to sewage. Broken sewers and faulty connections allow sewage to enter stormwater systems. Also, during flooding sewerage pumping stations are inundated with the floodwaters and sewage is released.

Water run-off from roads contains pollutants such as zinc, copper, lead and hydrocarbons from vehicle wear, vehicle emissions and from the road surface itself. Urban areas have large amounts of paved surface therefore there is a higher likelihood that water contaminated with organic matter will not be filtered through soils.

Sediment run-off from exposed soils in new subdivisions does occur and if it occurs due to breaches of the resource consent prosecution may result. To limit sediment run-off during earthworks straw bales and stormwater settling ponds are used. These are completely inadequate in high rainfall events where the interceptors are overwhelmed and silt laden waters flow into streams and rivers.

== Water pollution by region ==
Regions of New Zealand: 1 Northland; 2 Auckland; 3 Waikato; 4 Bay of Plenty; 5 East Cape; 6 Hawke's Bay; 7 Taranaki; 8 Manawatū-Whanganui / 9 Wellington; 10 Tasman; 11 Nelson; 12 Marlborough; 13 West Coast; 14 Canterbury; 15 Otago; 16 Southland

Regional councils have the responsibility to address water use and misuse issues as set out in the Resource Management Act, a significant Act of Parliament that regulates natural and physical resources such as land, air and water. Differing land use and climate means that water pollution varies across the regions.

In 2020, the National Policy Statement for Freshwater Management set safe "bottom line" levels for nitrogen, phosphorus, sediment and E. coli in New Zealand's rivers, lakes, and estuaries. A study by Our Land and Water National Science Challenge measured these levels throughout the country at 850 long-term water monitoring sites across 650,000 river segments, 961 lakes and 419 estuaries. It found that almost every region in New Zealand exceeded bottom line levels in one or more contaminants. More than three quarters of land in the country was contributing too much E. coli to fresh water, and agricultural land had excessive nitrogen loads, with Southland needing to reduce its nitrate pollution by 41 percent and Canterbury by 44 percent.

Water trends for selected regions (as of 2004)
Region	Allocation and abstraction		Water quantity		Surface water quality		Groundwater quality		Future demand
Region	Surface water	Ground water	Surface water	Ground water	Micro biological	Inorganic	Micro biological	Inorganic	Proposed irrigation schemes
Canterbury	Increasing	Increasing	Uncertain	Uncertain	Uncertain	Uncertain	Uncertain	Decreasing	Increasing
Hawke's Bay	Increasing	Increasing	Steady	Decreasing	Uncertain	Uncertain	Uncertain	Decreasing	Increasing
Waikato	Increasing	Increasing	Uncertain	Uncertain	Decreasing	Decreasing	Uncertain	Decreasing	Steady
Southland	Steady	Increasing	Steady	Steady	Uncertain	Uncertain	Decreasing	Uncertain	Uncertain

The above table is an aggregate of water trends in the regions and it shows no trends in water quality improvement or the related issue of water abstraction. However, there are observed improvements in water quality for some water bodies in some cases.

=== Bay of Plenty ===
The Tarawera River, nicknamed "the black drain", has had a history of water pollution, predominantly due to industrial activity. In 2009, the Tasman Mill gained permission to continue polluting the river for the next 25 years.

Between 1950 and 1989, the Whakatane Sawmill dumped contaminated sawdust, bark, scrap timber, and chemicals in and around Whakatane and the Rangitaiki Plains, including the Kopeopeo Canal, which has been called New Zealand's most polluted waterway. These wastes came from the timber treatment mill, where PCP had been used as a wood preservative. The PCP was contaminated with dioxins and furans (PCDD/PCDFs), resulting in dioxin-contaminated sediment. Remediation efforts on the canal (sparked initially by Ngāti Awa campaigner Joe Harawira) received international recognition in 2019.

=== Canterbury ===
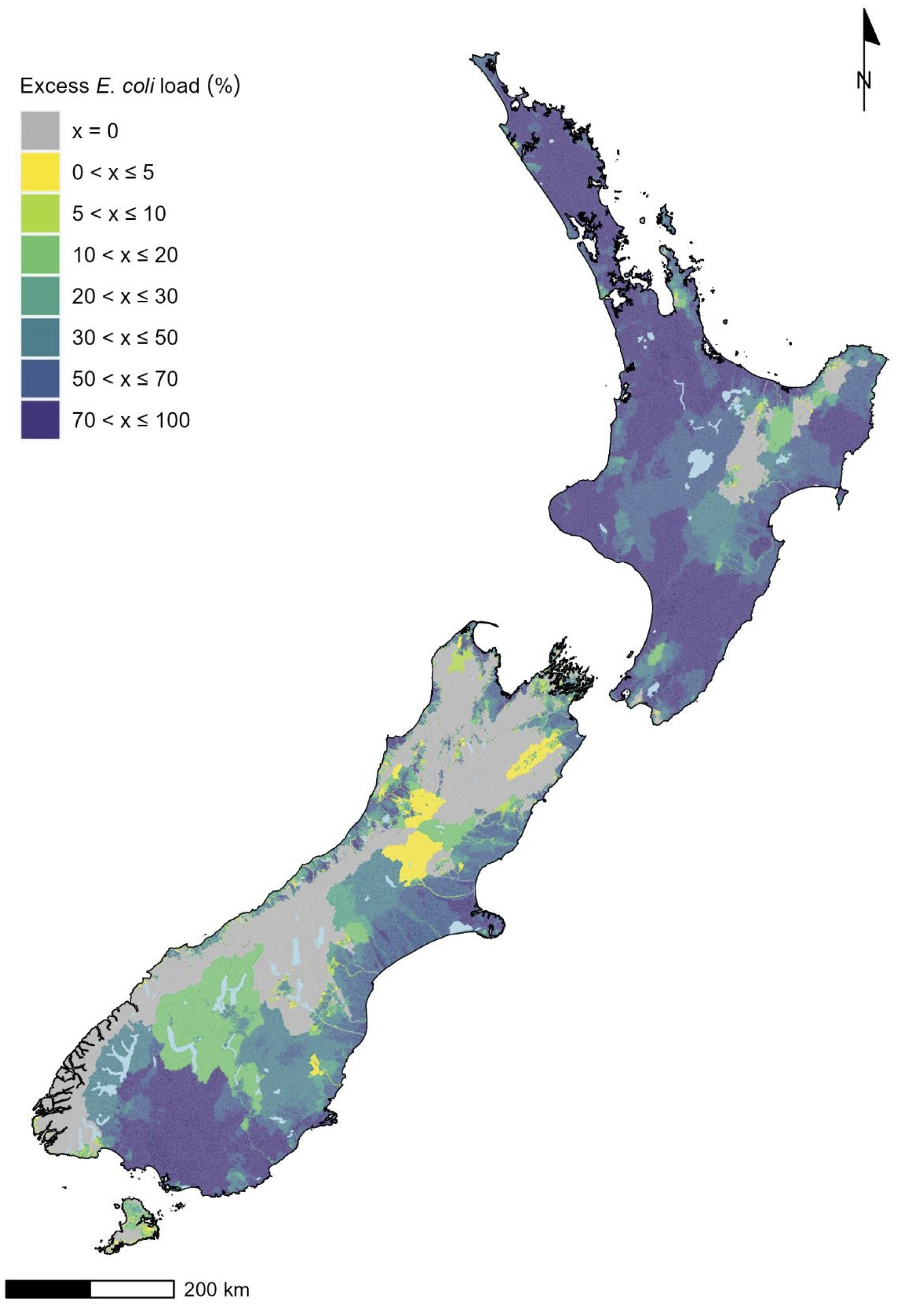
Excess E. coli pollution in New Zealand from Snelder et al. 2023

Historically much of Canterbury has been dry land and arable farming but there has been a huge increase in dairy farming in the region. Dairy farming in Canterbury requires large amounts of irrigation since the average rainfall is too low to support dairy cow pastures.

The Ōpāwaho / Heathcote River has been subjected to a number of recent pollution incidents.

Environment Canterbury recently introduced strict new environmental requirements for the region's farmers, requiring most farms to develop Farm Environment Plans showing how farms will take action to mitigate risks like nutrient leaching, soil erosion, effluent risks and protect waterways through actions such as fencing off waterways and undertaking riparian planting. The plans are independently audited. Since the introduction of these new rules, waterways are now showing improvement s across a number of measures.

=== Hawke's Bay ===
In 2016, drinking water in Havelock North was contaminated with Campylobacter via sheep faeces. More than 5,500 people fell ill, 45 people were hospitalised, and four people died.

=== Southland ===
In Southland effluent from dairy sheds used for more than 50 cows needs a resource consent. Environment Southland recommends effluent is spread at a rate of eight hectares per 100 cows and should not applied to wet soils. In 2012, Otago Regional Council carried out 19 prosecutions for incidents of pollution, twice as many as in 2011. The majority of the pollution incidents were of dairy effluent.

Drinking water for much of the Southland population is sourced from groundwater. A report published in 2026 via Environment Southland revealed increasing nitrate contamination in Southland's groundwater, with approximately 15,000 people in the area exposed to drinking water polluted by nitrates. Many sites show long-term deterioration. The report identified that intensive dairy farming and the nitrate excretion from urinating cows as a key contributor to the night nitrate levels.

=== Taranaki ===
In Taranaki, there are 1400 dairy sheds where the dairy effluent drains into streams instead of being sprayed to land, according to data from Taranaki Regional Council's 2012 State of the Environment report. In 2012, the president of the New Zealand Freshwater Sciences Society expressed surprise at the number of consented dairy discharges to streams, given most other regional councils prosecute dairy farmers who allow dairy effluent to enter waterways. In 2019, Taranaki Regional Council reported that freshwater quality had deteriorated, with only two of the fifteen sites tested meeting the standards for swimmability.

=== Waikato ===
The Waikato has had a long history of dairy farming and has some of the most productive soils in the country. Water quality, especially as shown by the indicators of conductivity and pH, in the Waikato region is deteriorating.

The Waikato River has a high level of pollution due to various point and non-point sources.

=== West Coast ===
The West Coast receives a high rainfall so any potential pollution will be diluted to some degree.

Until recently untreated sewage was being discharged into the Grey River but government funding was made available to build a sewage treatment plant.

== See also ==
- Water in New Zealand
- Canterbury Water Management Strategy
- Environment of New Zealand
- Agriculture in New Zealand#Environmental impacts
