= CraFarms =

CraFarms (or Crafar Farms) is a group of companies of which Allan, Beth and Frank Crafar were Directors. Crafar Farms was New Zealand's largest family-owned dairy business. The family business owned 22 dry stock and dairy farms with approximately 20,000 cows in various regions of the North Island, and was put into receivership in October 2009. Crafar Farms was involved in multiple prosecutions for pollution offences and incidents of poor animal welfare from 2007 to 2011. The business owed about $NZ200 million to its lenders. The Crafars stated that the recession and a drop in the Fonterra payout were major factors in the business going into receivership.

== History ==
Allan and Frank Crafar are brothers who grew up in Whanganui. Their father died when Allan was 11 and he had to hand milk their single cow. Frank left school at 14 and started his first sharemilking job at 16. Frank, along with his other brother Neville, brought a farm in the Manawatu four years later. In 1973 Allan met Beth on a blind date and they started working on Frank's farm. By July 1979, Allan and Frank Crafar had gone from milking 140 cows through an old-style walk through bale cowshed, to 400 cows using the same system after adding a 366-acre leased block in 1978. Production had increased by 28,000 kg annually and their large herd averaged one kilo of fat per day. In 1981 Frank, Allan and Beth brought their first farm together in Reporoa. They began their expansion by buying the neighbours farm the next year and by 1999 had 6,000 cattle on numerous farms around New Zealand. In 2009 they owned 22 farms, 18 of which are dairy, and 20,000 cows, making them New Zealand's largest family owned dairy business.

During the 2000s CraFarms was prosecuted multiple times in the Environment Court for unlawfully discharging stock effluent. In August 2008, Ian Balme the chair of Environment Waikato's regulatory committee described the Crafar family as "the poster boys for dirty dairying", whose "track record suggests they consider public waterways a perfectly appropriate place to tip their cowshed effluent". The Crafars had been prosecuted four times by then, with two more prosecutions pending. Balme commented that most farmers who have good farm systems and infrastructure had every right to resent farmers like the Crafars who damaged the industry. In 2009 they also were investigated by MAF for animal neglect after a video was released on YouTube showing calves starving on one of their farms. In October 2009 after they could no longer service the mounting debt the farms were placed into receivership. In 2010 the Ngāti Ruanui iwi were angered after stock damaged a pā located at Crafar Farms Hillside Farm. Following criticism of the Crafars in the media a Facebook page was set up by Oamaru farmer Stephen Smit in support of Allan Crafar. Russell Bouma, the son of a family friend who was murdered in a home invasion metres from the Crafars' own home, said they ran their farm for six months without any payment and described them as being "extremely efficient operators who have helped out a lot of people."

== Effluent discharges ==
In 2001, the Fish and Game Council started the public campaign for cleaner waterways downstream of dairy farms that later became known as the dirty dairying campaign. They identified dairy farms as a major factor in polluting the waterways, with one cow causing as much pollution as fourteen humans. The Crafars' first prosecution for discharging dairy effluent into waterways came in 2001 when Valley View Ltd, of which Mr Crafar is a director was fined $13,000 for an unlawful discharge of effluent on to land where it could enter waterways. According to Allan Crafar, from 2003 new compliance codes were implemented that caught out many farmers including the Crafars.

In 2007 two further prosecutions were brought against the CraFarms. Plateau Farms at Reporoa was fined $35,000 for unlawfully discharged dairy effluent onto land. Te Pohue Ltd was fined $13,000 for discharging dairy effluent into a tributary of the Esk River. In the second case Allan Crafar was also personally fined $5,000, while the farm sharemilker was fined $2,000. The next year a fourth prosecution was upheld when the Taharua Ltd farm on the Rangitaiki Plains was fined $37,500 for an illegal discharge of dairy effluent. This was the largest fine to date for a single prosecution, with the Judge saying it was necessary to send a deterrent to the Crafar group of companies.

In March 2009, the National Business Review reported that Allan Crafar and the CraFarm group, had been labelled the "poster boy for dirty dairying" by many in the industry. In response the Crafars brought new machinery and one of their sons was made a compliance officer with the role of ensuring all the farms complied with the new standards. Four months later, the Environment Court prosecuted Hillside Ltd, Allan Crafar, Frank Crafar and Elizabeth Crafar for 34 dairy effluent discharges. The offences related to dairy effluent spilling from ponds, feed pads, a broken irrigator hose and sumps leading to over-irrigation of paddocks. The Environment Court imposed fines on Hillside Farm Ltd, Allan Crafar and Frank Crafar of $29,500 each, and Elizabeth Crafar was fined $1500, for a total fine of $90,000.

== Animal welfare ==
On 29 September 2009, business journalist Bernard Hickey posted a video onto YouTube showing dehydrated calves starving on Crafar Farms' Benneydale dairy farm between Tokoroa and Te Kūiti. Hickey stated that the Ministry of Agriculture and Forestry (MAF) had inspected the farm on 7 September 2009 (after the video was recorded), and had destroyed many of the calves, as had the staff of the farm, but had allowed the farming to continue. Hickey attributed the lack of animal welfare to bad training of staff and poor management and the pressures of the Crafars' extensive debts incurred to expand the Crafar Farms.

On 30 September 2009, animal welfare inspectors inspected all the farms owned by the Crafars for cases of animal neglect. They stated that there were "significant animal welfare issues" among the 20,000 cows on the 22 farms owned by the Crafar family, including incidents of overstocking, inadequate feeding, underweight animals, and lack of shelter for calves. On five Crafar farms 50 cows had to be put down. Allan Crafar was reported as saying MAF had exaggerated the problems and its inspectors had no understanding of farming. He said; "They've never milked a cow in their lives and never got their hands dirty".

On 7 June 2010, a spokesperson for the Ministry of Agriculture and Forestry informed the Dominion Post that its investigations were not complete and that it was too early to say if prosecutions for offences involving animal cruelty would be laid. A MAF spokesman said that the investigation was taking time due to the need to assess ownership, control and responsibility for animal welfare within the complex relationships of the Crafar Farms group. In June 2011, five people involved with Crafers Taharua Dairy Farm pleaded not guilty to 714 charges of alleged animal welfare offences.

== Receivership and sale ==
On 5 October 2009 Crafar Farms had been placed into receivership by its lenders and that Michael Stiassny and Brendon Gibson had been appointed as receivers. The New Zealand Herald reported that Westpac, Rabobank and PGG Wrightson Finance, were owed about $NZ200 million, and had placed Crafar Farms into receivership as it was in breach of the covenants of the loans. The Crafars say that the recession and a drop in the Fonterra payout was a major factor in their business going into receivership. In 2007 Fonterra paid a record $7.90 per kilo of milk solids, this dropped by two dollars in 2008 and was just $4.55 in 2009. The Crafars had expanded rapidly by using their existing farms as leverage, and could no longer service their debt.

The company Natural Dairy (NZ) Holdings, which previously had been known as the China Jin Hui Mining Corporation, agreed to buy the Crafar family farms pending approval of the Overseas Investment Office. Prime Minister John Key admits 'concerns' about the sale of land to overseas interests, and the Chinese company objected to a (lower) bid by government-owned Landcorp. In December 2010, acting on the recommendation of the Overseas Investment Office, the Government decided not to approve Natural Dairy NZ's application to buy 16 farms from receivers.

In January 2011, the Shanghai-based company Pengxin International Group Limited made an offer to purchase the 16 North Island farms and applied to the Overseas Investment Office for consent. On 27 January 2012, the Land Information Minister and the Associate Minister of Finance granted consent for Shanghai Pengxin Group Co. Limited to buy the 16 Crafar farms via their subsidiary Milk New Zealand Holding Limited. On 15 February 2012 the High Court set aside the decision and ordered the Government to consider the application again after a judicial review requested by the Crafar Farms Purchase Group. On 20 April 2012, Land Information Minister Maurice Williamson and Associate Finance Minister Jonathan Coleman approved a revised report from the Overseas Investment Office (OIO) and granted permission for Milk New Zealand Holding Limited to buy the 16 Crafar farms.

== See also ==
- Agriculture in New Zealand
- Dairy farming in New Zealand
