= Dairy farming in New Zealand =

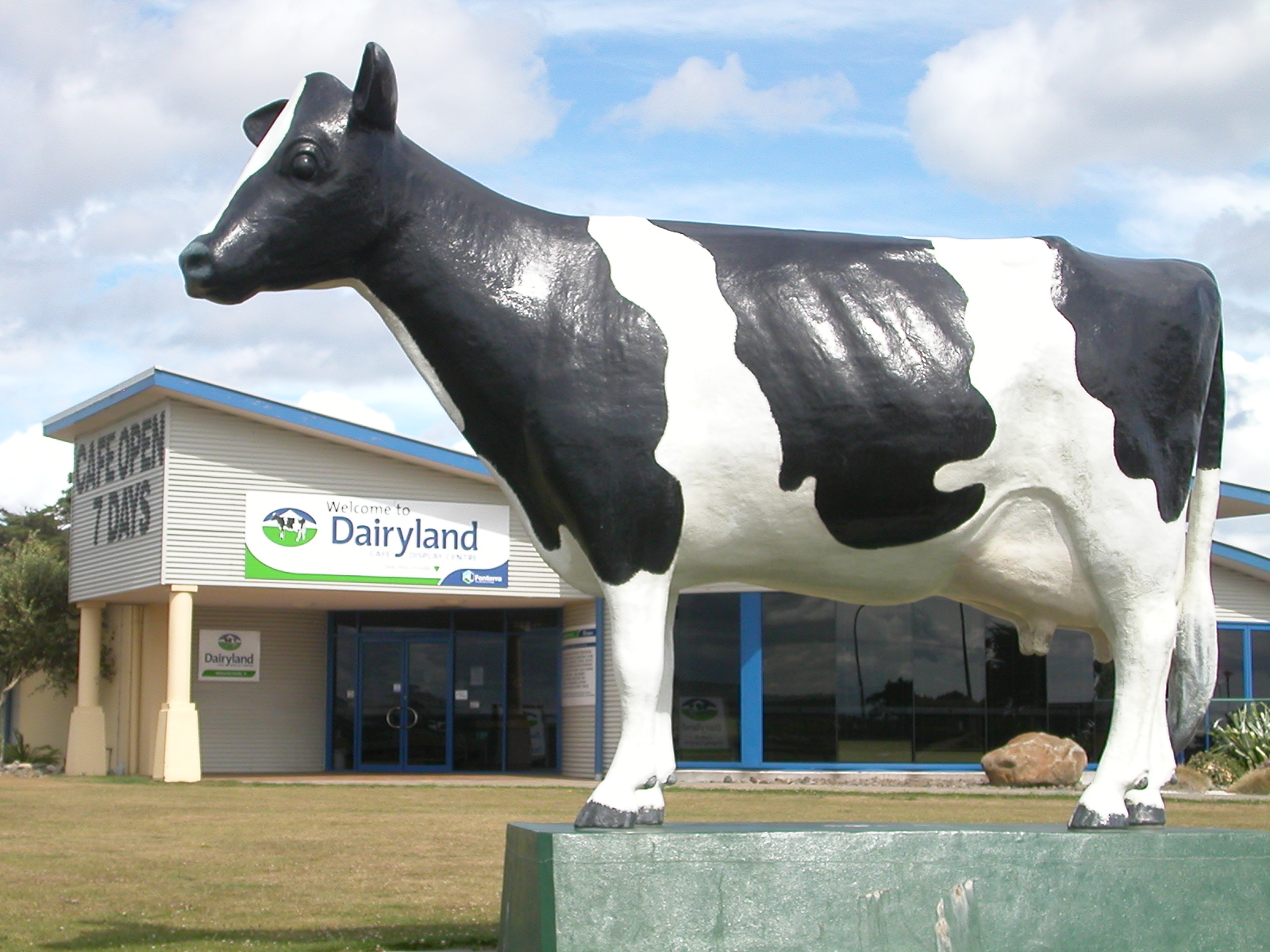
Cow sculpture outside Dairyland, South Taranaki

Dairy farming in New Zealand began during the early days of colonisation by Europeans. The New Zealand dairy industry is based almost exclusively on cattle, with a population of 4.92 million milking cows in the 2019–20 season. The income from dairy farming is now a major part of the New Zealand economy, becoming an NZ$13.4 billion industry by 2017.

== History ==
In 1814 the missionary Samuel Marsden introduced the first Shorthorn dairy cows (then known as Durhams) to mission stations in the Bay of Islands. The cows were gifted by New South Wales Governor Lachlan Macquarie from the New South Wales Crown herd. From the 1840s, most settlements had farms with some Shorthorn dairy cattle and it was common for families to have one or two cows, milked by the women and children. Herds tended to be larger near urban areas, where dairy products, predominantly milk and butter could be sold or traded.

The first dairy co-operative was established on Otago Peninsula in 1871. In 1881, the newly arrived colonist William Bowron gave a series of lectures propounding the notion that the institution of dairy factories, for the mass production of cheese, would be greatly advantageous to the economy of New Zealand. He was largely instrumental in the establishment of the Ashburton Cheese and Butter Factory at Flemington. The factory was managed by William Harding, the son of the inventor of modern Cheddar cheese, Joseph Harding. The venture was a great success, and consequently Bowron was appointed Government Inspector of Dairy Factories in 1883. In this capacity, he largely facilitated the setting up of factories across the country until his death in 1890. He published pamphlets on the manufacture of cheese, butter and bacon in New Zealand. His September 1883 pamphlet included architectural plans for different size dairy factories.

The government in Wellington also took increasing interest. New Zealand was affected by the worldwide Long Depression during the 1880s, and the Scarecrow Ministry led by Harry Atkinson responded by introducing a minister of agriculture in 1889 to stimulate the rural economy. George Richardson was the first holder of the office. This initiated a decade of advancement for the dairy industry. The Dairy Industry Act was passed in 1892, setting quality standards for export butter and cheese. A replacement act just two years later set criteria for the payment of milk based on quality.

By 1920, there were 600 dairy processing factories of which about 85% were owned by co-operatives. In 1923, the New Zealand Dairy Board (NZDB) was formed as a statutory board with monopoly control of the export of all New Zealand dairy products. In the 1930s there were around 500 co-operatives but after World War II, improved transportation, processing technologies and energy systems led to a trend of consolidation where the co-operatives merged and became larger and fewer in number. By the late 1990s, there were four co-operatives: the Waikato-based New Zealand Dairy Group, the Taranaki-based Kiwi Co-operative Dairies, the Hokitika-based Westland Milk Products and Tatua Co-operative Dairy Company.

In 1988, due to the effects of Cyclone Bola, many farms in Taranaki converted from agriculture to dairy farming.

In 2001, the Dairy Industry Restructuring Act 2001 was passed, allowing the two largest remaining cooperatives, New Zealand Co-operative Dairy Company Ltd and Kiwi Co-operative Dairies Ltd, to merge with the New Zealand Dairy Board to produce Fonterra, now New Zealand's largest company.

After the creation of Fonterra in 2001, the company came to dominate New Zealand’s dairy industry, processing around 95% of all milk produced in the country and becoming one of the world’s largest dairy exporters. The remaining independent co-operatives, Tatua Co-operative Dairy Company and Westland Milk Products, continued to operate on a smaller scale.

In 2019, Westland Milk Products was acquired by the Chinese conglomerate Inner Mongolia Yili Industrial Group, ending its co-operative status. Tatua, however, has remained independent, focusing on high-value specialist products and consistently returning one of the highest payouts to its farmer-shareholders.

During the 21st century, New Zealand dairy farming has faced growing scrutiny and regulation over environmental impacts, particularly around water quality, greenhouse gas emissions, and land use change. The industry has invested in sustainability initiatives, on-farm technology, and research partnerships aimed at reducing its environmental footprint while maintaining export competitiveness.

Dairy exports have expanded well beyond the historical reliance on the United Kingdom, with China emerging as the largest single market by value from the 2010s onward. Today, New Zealand dairy products are exported to more than 140 countries, making the sector a cornerstone of the national economy.

== Farm operations ==
Dairy farming in New Zealand is primarily pasture-based. Dairy cattle primarily feed on grass, supplemented by silage, hay and other crops during winter and other times of slow pasture growth. Traditional dairy production areas are the wetter areas of the country, including the Waikato, the Bay of Plenty, Taranaki, Manawatū, Nelson, Tasman and the West Coast, but increased irrigation has seen dairy farms established in drier areas such as Canterbury and Otago.

Around 56% of dairy farms in New Zealand are owner-operated as of 2015, while 29% are operated by sharemilkers and 14% are operated by contract milkers. Herd-owning sharemilkers (formerly 50:50 sharemilkers) own their own herd, and are responsible for employing workers and the day-to-day operations of the farm, in return for receiving a percentage (typically 50%) of the milk income. Variable order sharemilkers do not own their own herd, and receive a lower percentage (typically 20–30%) of the milk income, while contract milkers are paid a fixed price per unit of milk.

The dairy farming year in New Zealand typically runs from 1 June to 31 May. The first day of the new year, historically known as "Gypsy Day" but now more commonly called "Moving Day" (also spelt "Mooving Day" as a pun), sees a large-scale migration as sharemilkers and contract milkers take up new contracts and move herds and equipment between farms. Calving typically takes place in late winter/early spring (July to September), and cows are milked for 270–300 days before being dried off in late autumn (April and May). Some farms, either wholly or partly, employ winter milking, with calving in late summer and early autumn (February and March).

== Processing and export ==
Dairy export volumes for year ended 30 June 2018
Product	Volume (tonnes)	Value (million NZ$)
Whole milk powder	1,319,542	5,818
Butter, AMF, and cream	454,660	3,812
Skim milk powder	431,303	1,228
Cheese	329,854	1,905
Casein	191,407	1,601
Infant Formula	91,914	1,240
Other products	419,381	1,050

In the 2019–20 season, New Zealand produced 21.1 billion litres (4.6×10^{9} imp gal; 5.6×10^{9} US gal) of raw milk containing 1.9 million tonnes of milk solids (protein and milkfat). This makes the country the world's seventh-largest milk producer, with about 3% of world production in the 2016/17 dairy season. Most of this exported, with Fonterra alone responsible for approximately one third of the world's dairy exports.

Before the advent of refrigerated shipping in the 1880s, dairy production was entirely for local consumption, with butter and cheese usually being produced on the farm, with the surplus being sold to the community via the local store. Small dairy factories began to be established in the 1880s, and soon there was one in almost every village in dairying regions. Production began to be centralised in the second half of the 20th century, with facilities such as the Fonterra plants at Whareroa (near Hāwera), Edendale, Clandeboye (near Timaru), and Te Rapa being the four largest in the Southern Hemisphere. Edendale is also currently the largest dairy factory in the world by milk intake.

Fonterra is the largest processor of milk in New Zealand, processing 82 percent of all milk solids as of 2018. Other large dairy companies are Open Country Dairy (7.4%), Synlait and Westland Milk Products (3.4% each), Miraka (1.4%), Oceania Dairy (1.1%), and Tatua Co-operative Dairy Company (0.7%).

== Pest and diseases ==
=== Enzootic bovine leucosis ===
Enzootic bovine leucosis is a form of leukaemia caused by the Bovine leukemia virus (BLV). In 1997, a national control scheme was implemented with the goal of eradicating BLV from New Zealand. This was declared successful in 2009

=== Bovine tuberculosis ===
Bovine tuberculosis is currently (2012) endemic in possums across approximately 38 per cent of New Zealand (known as ‘vector risk areas’). In these areas, nearly 70 per cent of new herd infections can be traced back to possums or ferrets. From 1979 to 1984, possum control was stopped due to lack of funding. In spite of regular and frequent TB testing of cattle herds, the number of infected herds snowballed and continued to increase until 1994, and the area of New Zealand where there were TB wild animals expanded from about 10 to 40 per cent. The Biosecurity Act 1993, which established a National Pest Management Strategy, is the legislation behind control of the disease in New Zealand. The Animal Health Board (AHB) operates a nationwide programme of cattle testing and possum control with the goal of eradicating the bacterium responsible for bovine tuberculosis (Mycobacterium bovis) from wild vector species across 2.5 million hectares – or one quarter – of New Zealand's at-risk areas by 2026 and, eventually, eradicating the disease entirely. As of the 2017/18 dairy season, only twenty herds in New Zealand remained affected.

Possums are not native to New Zealand, and are considered both an agricultural and a conservation pest. They are controlled through a combination of trapping, ground-baiting and, where other methods are impractical, aerial treatment with 1080 poison. That possums are such effective transmitters of TB appears to be facilitated by their behaviour once they succumb to the disease. Terminally ill TB possums will show increasingly erratic behaviour, such as venturing out during the daytime to get enough food to eat, and seeking out buildings in which to keep warm. As a consequence they may wander onto paddocks, where they naturally attract the attention of inquisitive cattle and deer. This behaviour has been captured on video.

=== Mycoplasma bovis ===
Mycoplasma bovis, a bacterial disease known to cause a range of serious conditions in cattle was detected in New Zealand in July 2017. Known conditions include mastitis, pneumonia, arthritis, and late-term abortions. The disease has been described as the worst disease to land in New Zealand, with an eradication cost estimated at $886 million over 10 years.

=== Leptospirosis ===
Leptospirosis is a disease caused by bacteria known as Leptospira and is one of the most common diseases transmitted from animals to humans in New Zealand. The disease is common amongst dairy farmers and the numbers notified are increasing yearly with 141 cases notified in 2017.

== Environmental impacts ==
Dairy farming is being increasingly held to account for the environmental impacts of the industry. Fish and Game started the "dirty dairying" campaign in 2002 to highlight the effect of dairying on water quality. As a response to the campaign the Dairying and Clean Streams Accord was established in an attempt to reduce the level of water pollution. Initially the family owned Crafar Farms bore the brunt of the prosecutions and were labelled the "poster boys for dirty dairying" by Environment Waikato's regulatory committee chairman Ian Balme. Dairy NZ in 2014 claimed that as a direct result of the Sustainable Dairying: Water Accord all New Zealand dairy companies now have programmes in place to assess the effluent systems of suppliers on a three-yearly basis, with several assessing every farm every year. Despite this, a 2018 report from Forest and Bird found that regional councils had 425 reported cases of serious non-compliance in 2016–17, and this was likely a significant under-reporting.

The quality of freshwater in New Zealand is impacted by dairying practices such as water abstraction, riparian grazing, fertiliser use, removal of vegetation, and draining of wetlands. These lead to an increase of faecal contamination, excess nutrients, and sedimentation in water. Waterways in agricultural or urban catchments have been found to generally have poorer water quality compared to those with little or no farming and urban development. Research has shown that dairy farming has a disproportionate effect on that decline in water quality compared to other agricultural practices.

Nitrate leaching has significantly increased in New Zealand largely due to the use of nitrogen fertilisers, which enter rivers and streams via surface runoff, or via the consumption and excretion by cattle, which then enters groundwater. Research has estimated that 79% of the nitrogen which dairy cows consume is returned to the ground through waste. A 2025 study identified dairy effluent as a primary cause of the high nitrate levels found groundwater.

== Milk pricing ==
Dairy farmers are paid by milk processors based on the amount of milk solids (protein and fat) sold. For the 2019–20 season, Fonterra paid farmers $7.14 per kilogram of milk solids (kgMS) excluding GST, with other processors paying between $6.75 and $9.96 per kgMS. Farmers are penalised if they supply milk that fails to meet quality standards, for example, if there is a high somatic cell count or antibiotics are present.

In 2011 controversy arose over the retail price of milk in New Zealand, leading to an enquiry by a government select committee and a small scale price war.

== Regulation ==
Historically local authorities were responsible for controlling milk distribution and sale. In 1968, the Milk Act of 1967 established the New Zealand Milk Board to handle the inspection and monitor distribution of milk instead of local authorities.

From the late 20th century, regulation of the dairy industry increasingly shifted away from product specific controls toward broader, risk based food safety frameworks. This transition reflected changes in domestic consumption patterns, the growing importance of export markets, and the need to align New Zealand’s regulatory settings with international food safety standards. Rather than regulating milk and dairy products through narrowly defined statutes, responsibility for food safety oversight became consolidated under nationally consistent legislation applying across the wider food sector.

This approach placed greater emphasis on managing food safety risks throughout the supply chain, from primary production through processing and distribution, while allowing for different regulatory pathways based on scale and risk profile. These changes culminated in the introduction of the Food Act 2014, which modernised New Zealand’s food safety regime by replacing earlier legislation and establishing a unified framework for regulating dairy processors alongside other food producers, while maintaining sector specific rules for dairy products within that broader system.

== See also ==
- Agriculture in New Zealand
- Sharemilking
- Crafar Farms
