= Dirty dairying =

Water pollution from dairy farming

In New Zealand "dirty dairying" refers to damage to the ecological health of New Zealand's freshwater environment by the intensification of dairy farming, and also to the high profile campaign begun in 2002 by the Fish and Game Council to highlight and combat this.

The campaign led to the creation in 2003 of the Dairying and Clean Streams Accord, a voluntary agreement between Fonterra, Ministry for the Environment, Ministry of Agriculture and Forestry, and regional councils. In 2014, the Dairying and Clean Streams Accord was succeeded by the Sustainable Dairying: Water Accord.

== Effects ==
Intensive dairy farming practices has led to water pollution from cattle effluent in many of the streams and rivers in New Zealand. The Waikato River has had a long history of water pollution and now fails health regulations for human contact. It passes through the highly productive Waikato region, where dairy farming is a common land use. More recently, the Manawatū River has been highlighted in the media due to its high pollution levels. Lake Ellesmere / Te Waihora has suffered from eutrophication since the 1970s due to farming activities in the area, Lake Taupō has had government funding to curb pollution, and the Rotorua lakes are heavily polluted. A study using water quality data from 1996 to 2002 found that the vast majority of lowland rivers and streams passing through pastoral land were polluted.

== Prosecutions ==
There have been a number of prosecutions for dirty dairying. Over a four-year period from July 2008 until June 2012 at least 151 prosecutions involving 300 charges were made for unlawful discharges of dairy effluent. Environment Court fines collected for the period totalled $NZ$3.2 million.

Some notable cases include:

- In June 2008, numerous South Otago farmers and companies were prosecuted under the Resource Management Act for unauthorised effluent discharges. The defendants were convicted by the Environment Court.
- In August 2008, the West Coast Regional Council, responsible for water quality regulation, was accused of complacency by the West Coast District Health Board for failing to have any official water source meet the drinking water standard.
- The Crafar family, as well as being accused of animal cruelty, were prosecuted seven times over a period of three years before their farms were placed in receivership in October 2009. A $45,000 fine was handed down to the Crafars and their sharemilker in 2010 for allowing effluent to enter a waterway near the town of Bulls.
- In 2010, the Whataroa company Potae and van der Poel Ltd were given a $120,000 fine, possibly the largest of its type up to that time, for repeated breaches of effluent discharge. The company had been issued with abatement notices for effluent runoff three farms in 2008. Effluent had entered tributaries of the Whataroa River.
- In April 2019, a Cambridge farming company and one of its directors was convicted of eight charges under the Resource Management Act (RMA), and fined a total of $131,840. One of its directors, Dawson Craig Pollock, had been the subject of prosecution for similar breaches in 1993 and 2001.
- In August 2019, Waikato farmer Aaron John Miller and his company Ondaedge Farms Ltd, was convicted and fined $30,000 for discharging dairy effluent into the environment.

== Legislation and regulation ==
- Resource Management Act 1991

== See also ==
- Environment of New Zealand
- Dairy farming in New Zealand
- Agriculture in New Zealand
