= Sustainable Dairying: Water Accord =

The Sustainable Dairying: Water Accord is a voluntary agreement signed by leading participants of New Zealand's dairy industry in 2013. It serves as a successor to the 2003 Dairying and Clean Streams Accord.
