= Canterbury Water Management Strategy =

Water management strategy in New Zealand

The Canterbury Water Management Strategy is being developed in Canterbury, New Zealand, to address water related issues in the region.

It was initiated by the Ministry of Agriculture and Forestry, Ministry for the Environment and Environment Canterbury after a drought in 1998. Leadership for the strategy is from the Canterbury Mayoral Forum.

The outcome of the Canterbury Water Management Strategy was given as the reason for the Hurunui Water Project to defer resource consent hearings for a year for water takes of the Hurunui River.

== See also ==
- Water pollution in the Canterbury Region
- Water in New Zealand
- Environment of New Zealand
