= Great Recession in Oceania =

The Great Recession in Oceania was the great recession of the late 2000s and early 2010s in Oceania. The Oceanic countries suffered minimal impact during this time, in comparison with the impact that North America and Europe felt.

== Australia ==
Australia is one of the three Organisation for Economic Co-operation and Development (OECD) countries that did not experience two consecutive negative quarters of growth and one of the two that avoided negative year-end GDP growth during the global recession. It was not affected by the crisis from 2008 to 2009 due to a number of factors such as government stimulus spending of $11.8 billion, its proximity to the booming Chinese economy and the related mining boom kept growth ticking over throughout the worst of the global conditions. In fact, sources such as the IMF and the Reserve Bank of Australia had predicted Australia was well positioned to weather the crisis with minimal disruption, sustaining more than 2% GDP growth in 2009 (as many Western nations went into recession). In the same year, the World Economic Forum ranked Australia's banking system the fourth best in the world, while the Australian dollar's 30% drop was seen as a boon for trade, shielding the country from the crisis and helping to slow growth and consumption. Australia's recession affected New Zealand's economy as Australia was New Zealand's biggest export market. It is said that the term Great Recession as a description of the post-2008 slump is not recognized by Australians particularly those under 30 due to its mild, intangible impact on the country's economy.

Some analysts had predicted the continuing decline of trade in 2009 could put the economy into recession for the first time in 17 years. However, these initial fears were proved largely unfounded as the Australian economy avoided recession and the unemployment rate peaked at a much lower rate than had been predicted. To help address the anticipated slowdown, the Australian government also announced a stimulus package worth $27 billion to spur economic growth while the Reserve Bank of Australia introduced a series of interest rate cuts.

While Australia's overall national economy grew, some non-mining states and Australia's non-mining economy experienced a recession.

== New Zealand ==
The New Zealand Treasury defines "recession" as "consecutive falls in real GDP." The department said that New Zealand's real GDP fell 3.3% between the December 2007 quarter and the March 2008 quarter, and that this start, before any other OECD nation, was the result of domestic factors. It said that New Zealand's recession was among the first to finish and was one of the shallowest. New Zealand Institute of Economic Research's quarterly survey showed New Zealand's economy contracted 0.3 percent in the first quarter of 2008.

There was a substantial number of finance company collapses between 2006 and 2012. Housing starts in New Zealand fell 20 percent in June 2008, the lowest levels since 1986. Excluding apartments, approvals dropped 13 percent from May. Approvals in the year ended June fell 12 percent from a year earlier. Second-quarter approvals dropped 19 percent. The figures suggested a decrease in construction and economic growth. House sales fell 42 percent in June from a year earlier.

The New Zealand Treasury concluded that the country's economy had contracted for a second quarter based on economic indicators, putting New Zealand in a recession. New Zealand's central bank cut rates by half a percent arguing the economy was in recession. New Zealand's GDP declined by 0.2 percent in the second quarter putting the country in its first recession in a decade.

The economy emerged from recession in mid-2009, with the second-quarter GDP report showing the economy grew by 0.1 per cent on the March quarter.
