= Dairying and Clean Streams Accord =

The Dairying and Clean Streams Accord is an agreement signed in 2003 in New Zealand between Fonterra, Ministry for the Environment, Ministry of Agriculture and Forestry and regional councils. The Accord was prompted by the high-profile "dirty dairying" campaign by Fish and Game New Zealand which highlighted water pollution of lakes, rivers and streams due to the intensification of dairy farming in parts of New Zealand.

In 2014, the Dairying and Clean Streams Accord was succeeded by the Sustainable Dairying: Water Accord.

== Purpose ==
The stated purpose of the accord is to provide "a statement of intent and framework for actions to promote sustainable dairy farming in New Zealand. It focuses on reducing the impacts of dairying on the quality of New Zealand streams, rivers, lakes, ground water and wetlands." The goal is to ensure that water is suitable for fish, drinking by stock and swimming (in designated areas).

Politically, the accord was intended to prevent further regulation of the dairy industry following Fish and Game New Zealand’s dirty dairying campaign begun in 2003.

The performance targets are:

- Dairy cattle excluded from 50% of streams, rivers and lakes by 2007, 90% by 2012
- 50% of regular crossing points have bridges or culverts by 2007, 90% by 2012
- 100% of farm dairy effluent discharges to comply with resource consents and regional plans immediately
- 100% of dairy farms to have in place systems to manage nutrient inputs and outputs by 2007
- 50% of regionally significant wetlands to be fenced by 2005, 90% by 2007

== Progress ==
Progress reports on achieving the performance targets are prepared annually. The 2006-2007 report, released in February 2008, notes 83% compliance for the target of excluding cattle from waterways, 97% for bridging waterways, 93% for correct dairy farm effluent treatment and a 64-97% for preventing nutrient losses. The integrity of this data was later questioned when a 2012 independent report commissioned by MAF indicated that while Fonterra’s survey of farmers suggests that nationally 84% of properties have stock excluded from waterways, an independent audit by the Ministry of Primary Industries revealed a position that only 42% of farms nationally had stock exclusion. A scientist at the University of Waikato described the 2006-2007 report as self-congratulatory and accused the Government of a lack of leadership.

Almost ten years later, a 2018 report from Forest and Bird found that regional councils had 425 reported cases of serious non-compliance in 2016-2017, and this was likely a significant under-reporting.

== Criticism ==
In December 2002, the farming lobby group, Federated Farmers, initially opposed the accord since they considered that Fonterra was going beyond their brief and they had not consulted farmers. However, since then, the Dairy and Clean Stream Accord has become "the cornerstone of dairying's defences against accusations it's doing nothing to protect the environment".

In a report jointly released by Fish and Game New Zealand and Forest and Bird, the Accord is criticised for failing to improve water quality. The main reason given for this is that the Accord does not focus on measurable improvements in water quality. Other faults mentioned in the report are; a lack of independent auditing of the self-reporting by farmers, a failure to meet the principal targets, inconsistency in reporting progress, and the use of incorrect measures in the progress reports. A Federated Farmers review was critical of the report and claimed it was poorly constructed, was written as a campaign tool, made unfounded suppositions and contained "leaps in logic". The review, written by Federated Farmers including a staff member who has a diploma in communications and public relations, could be open to criticism.

The 2008-2009 report, released in March 2010, was criticised by Fonterra, Federated Farmers and the Minister of Agriculture David Carter saying that it revealed unacceptable levels of effluent management.

In June 2010, an editorial in the Dominion Post argued that the self-regulated approach of the Clean Streams Accord was not working and that the Minister for the Environment Nick Smith must enact more effective measures such as rules, as there are some farmers who regard “environmental standards as an inconvenience in the pursuit of higher production and higher profits”.

== See also ==
- Dairy farming in New Zealand
- Agriculture in New Zealand
- Water pollution in New Zealand
