= Canterbury Region =

Region of New Zealand

Canterbury Waitaha (Māori)
- Region
- Canterbury Region in New Zealand
- Coordinates: 43.6°S 172.0°E
- Country: New Zealand
- Island: South Island
- Established: 1989
- Seat: Christchurch
- Territorial authorities: List: Kaikōura District; Hurunui District; Selwyn District; Waimakariri District; Christchurch City; Ashburton District; Mackenzie District; Timaru District; Waimate District; Waitaki District (59.61% of area)

Government
  - Body: Canterbury Regional Council
  - Chair: Deon Swiggs
  - Deputy Chair: Iaean Cranwell

Area
  - Land: 44,503.60 km^{2} (17,182.94 sq mi)

Population (June 2025)
  - Region: 698,200
  - Density: 15.69/km^{2} (40.63/sq mi)
- Demonym: Cantabrian

GDP
  - Total: NZ$44.032 billion (2021) (2nd)
  - Per capita: NZ$67,400 (2021)
- Time zone: UTC+12 (NZST)
  - Summer (DST): UTC+13 (NZDT)
- ISO 3166 code: NZ-CAN
- HDI (2023): 0.941 very high · 3rd

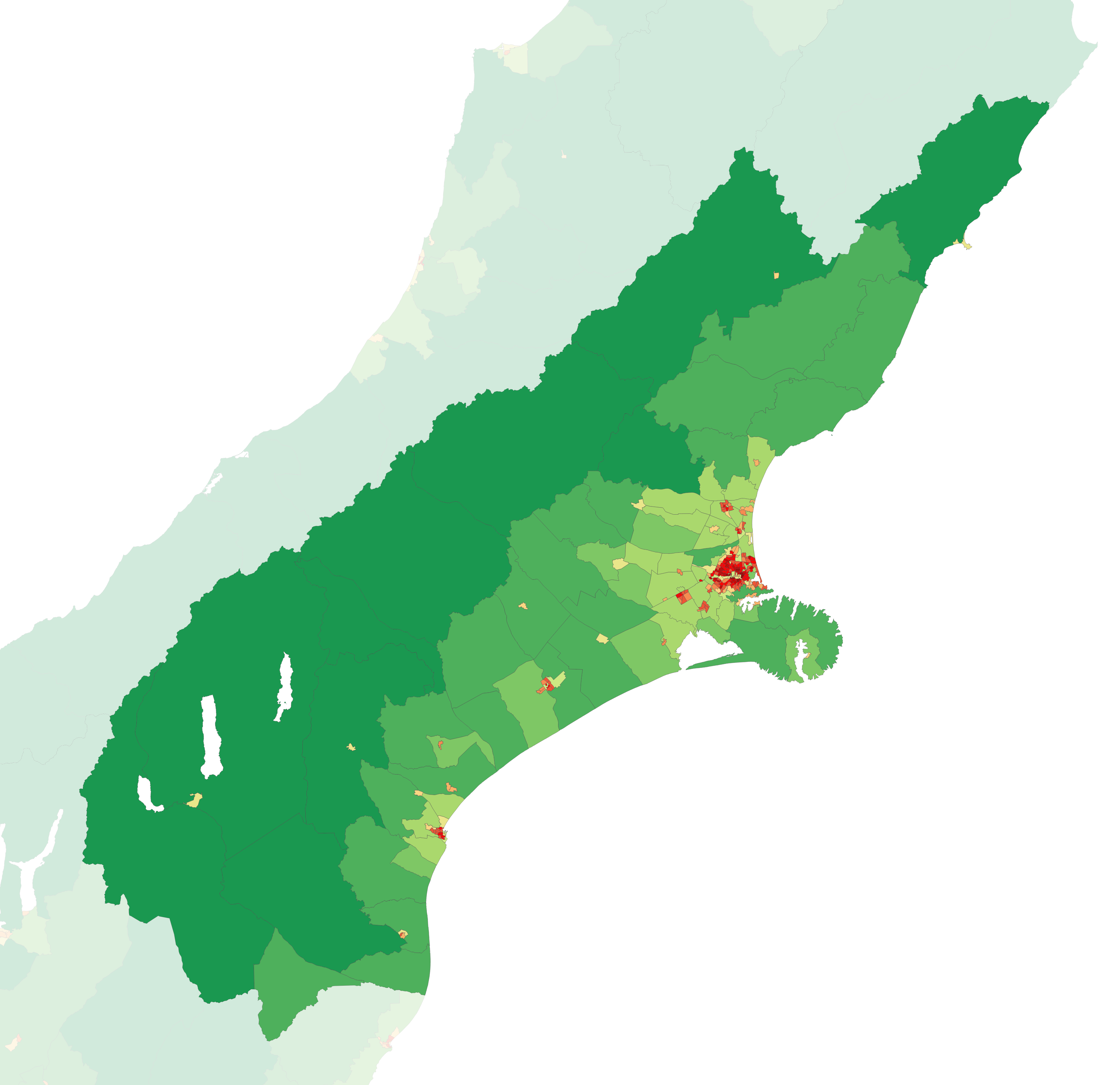
A map showing population density in the Canterbury Region at the 2023 census

Canterbury (Māori: Waitaha) is a region of New Zealand, located in the central-eastern South Island. The region covers an area of 44,503.88 square kilometres (17,183.04 sq mi), making it the largest region in the country by area. It is home to a population of 698,200 (June 2025).

The region in its current form was established in 1989 during nationwide local government reforms. The Kaikōura District joined the region in 1992 following the abolition of the Nelson-Marlborough Regional Council.

Christchurch, the South Island's largest city and the country's second-largest urban area, is the seat of the region and home to 58 percent of the region's population. Other major towns and cities include Timaru, Ashburton, Rangiora and Rolleston.

== History ==
=== Natural history ===
The land, water, flora, and fauna of Canterbury has a long history, stretching from creation of the greywacke basement rocks that make up the Southern Alps to the arrival of the first humans. This history is linked to the solidification and development of tectonic plates, the development of oceans and then life itself.

The region is a part of the larger Zealandia continent, itself a part of the larger Australian and Pacific tectonic plates. In the first instance, the land is based upon the constructive tectonic forces of this convergent and transformational tectonic plate boundary. In the second instance, the erosive forces of rain, snow, ice, and rock grinding against rock have developed large gravel fans that extend out from the mountains. In the third instance, there is volcanism punching through the basement rocks and blanket of sediments to the surface. Upon this solid foundation, and slowly over the billions of years, life made up of a countless generations of interconnected adaptations developed into the unique flora and fauna of Aotearoa/New Zealand. The remnants populations of these unique species are visible today in the publicly protected conservation lands.

The species of Waitaha/Canterbury were adapted to the climate and geography that traverses inland from the coastline to the highest peaks, and from the warmer climes in the north to the colder in the south.

=== Before European settlement ===
Canterbury has been populated by a succession of Māori peoples over the centuries. When European settlers arrived, it was occupied by Ngāi Tahu, whose numbers had been greatly reduced by warfare, among themselves and with Te Rauparaha and his Ngāti Toa from the North Island, in the early 19th century.

=== Colonisation ===
In 1848, Edward Gibbon Wakefield, a Briton, and John Robert Godley, an Anglo-Irish aristocrat, founded the Canterbury Association to establish an Anglican colony in the South Island. The colony was based upon theories developed by Wakefield while in prison for eloping with a woman not-of-age. Due to ties to the University of Oxford, the Canterbury Association succeeded in raising sufficient funds and recruiting middle-class and upper-class settlers. In April 1850, a preliminary group led by Godley landed at Port Cooper – modern-day Lyttelton Harbour / Whakaraupō – and established a port, housing and shops in preparation for the main body of settlers. In December 1850, the first wave of 750 settlers arrived at Lyttelton in a fleet of four ships.

Following 1850, the province's economy developed with the introduction of sheep farming. The Canterbury Region's tussock plains in particular were suitable for extensive sheep farming. Since they were highly valued by settlers for their meat and wool, there were over half a million sheep in the region by the early 1850s. By the 1860s, this figure had risen to three million. During this period, the architect Benjamin Mountfort designed many civic and ecclesiastical buildings in the Gothic Revival style.

=== Canterbury Province ===
The Canterbury Province was formed in 1853 following the passing of the New Zealand Constitution Act 1852. It was formed from part of New Munster Province and covered the middle part of the South Island, stretching from the east coast to the west coast. The province was abolished, along with other provinces of New Zealand, when the Abolition of the Provinces Act came into force on 1 November 1876. The modern Canterbury Region has slightly different boundaries, particularly in the north, where it includes some districts from the Nelson Province.

=== 2010–2011 earthquakes ===
==== September 2010 ====
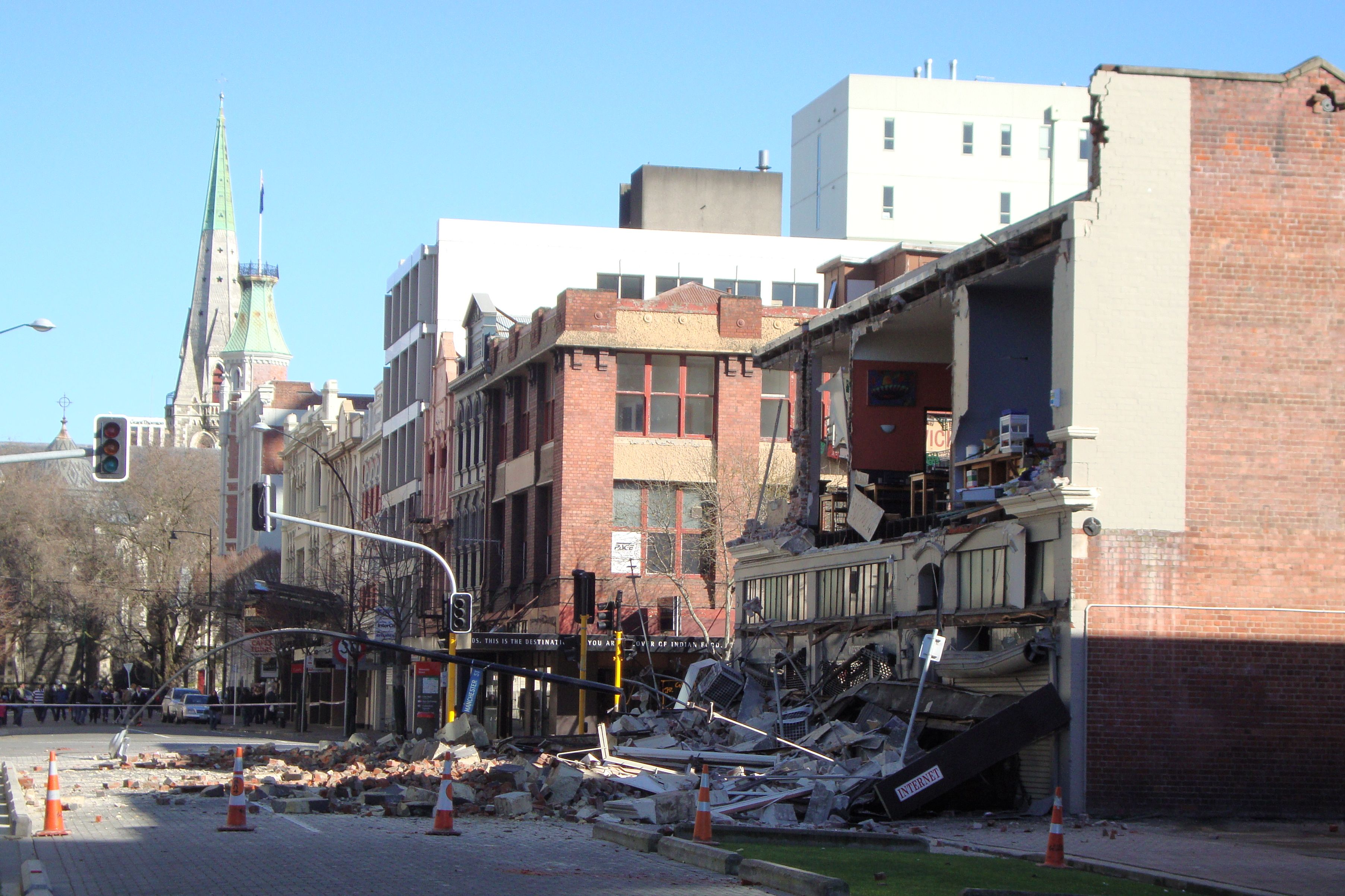
Building damage in Worcester Street, corner Manchester Street, with ChristChurch Cathedral in the background (September 2010)

A magnitude 7.1 earthquake occurred in the region on Saturday 4 September 2010, at 04:35 am. The epicentre was located 40 kilometres (25 mi) west of Christchurch; 10 kilometres (6.2 mi) south-east of Darfield, and had a depth of 10 kilometres (6.2 mi). The earthquake caused widespread damage to buildings and power outages, but no direct fatalities. Sewers were damaged, gas and water lines were broken, and power to up to 75% of the city was disrupted. Christchurch residents reported chimneys falling in through roofs, cracked ceilings and collapsed brick walls.

A local state of emergency was declared at 10:16 am on 4 September for the city, and evacuations of parts were planned to begin later in the day. People inside the Christchurch city centre were evacuated, and the city's central business district remained closed until 5 September. A curfew from 7 pm on 4 September to 7 am on 5 September was put in place. The New Zealand Army was deployed to assist police and enforce the curfew.

There were 63 reported aftershocks in the first 48 hours, with three registering 5.2 magnitude. The total insurance costs of the event were estimated as up to $11 billion, according to the New Zealand Treasury.

==== February 2011 ====
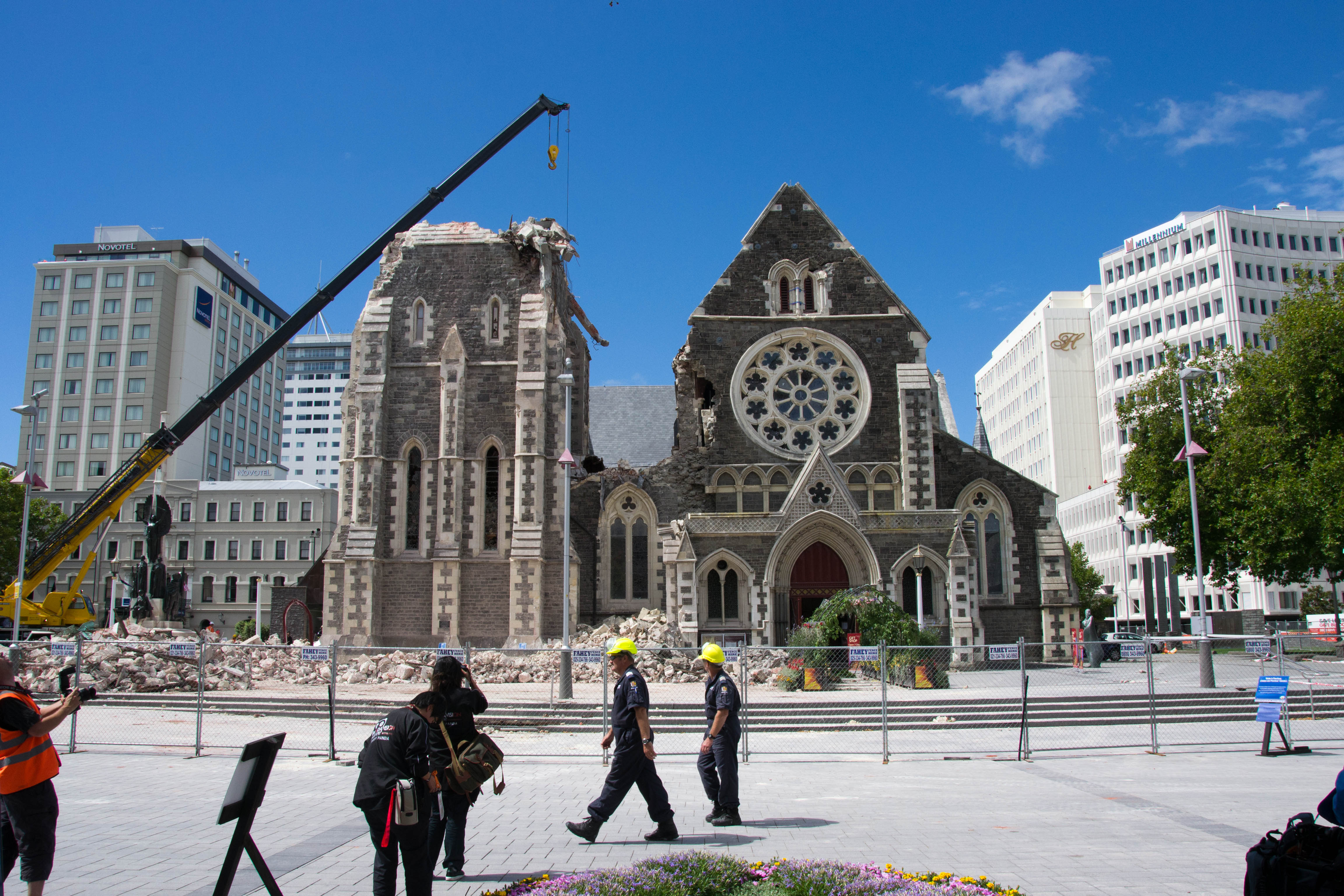
ChristChurch Cathedral showing the effects of the February 2011 earthquake (tower under demolition)

A large aftershock of magnitude 6.3 occurred on 22 February 2011 at 12:51 pm. It was centred just to the north of Lyttelton, 10 kilometres south-east of Christchurch, at a depth of 5 km. Although lower on the moment magnitude scale than the quake of September 2010, the intensity and violence of the ground shaking was measured to be VIII on the MMI, which is among the strongest ever recorded globally in an urban area due to the shallowness and proximity of the epicentre.

The quake struck on a busy weekday afternoon. This, along with the strength of the quakes, and the proximity to the city centre, resulted in 181 deaths. Many buildings and landmarks were severely damaged, including the iconic Shag Rock and Christchurch Cathedral. New Zealand's first National State of Emergency was promptly declared.

==== June 2011 ====
On 13 June 2011 at about 1:00 pm New Zealand time, Christchurch was rocked by a magnitude 5.7 quake, followed by a magnitude 6.3 quake at 2:20 pm, centred in a similar location to that of the February quake with a depth of 6.0 kilometres. Dozens of aftershocks occurred over the following days, including several over magnitude 4.

Phone lines and power were lost in some suburbs, and liquefaction surfaced mainly in the eastern areas of the city which were worst affected following the aftershocks. Many residents in and around the hillside suburb of Sumner self-evacuated. Further damage was reported to buildings inside the cordoned central business district, with an estimate of 75 additional buildings needing demolition. Among the buildings further damaged was the Christchurch Cathedral, which lost its iconic rose window. There was one death and multiple injuries.

== Geography ==
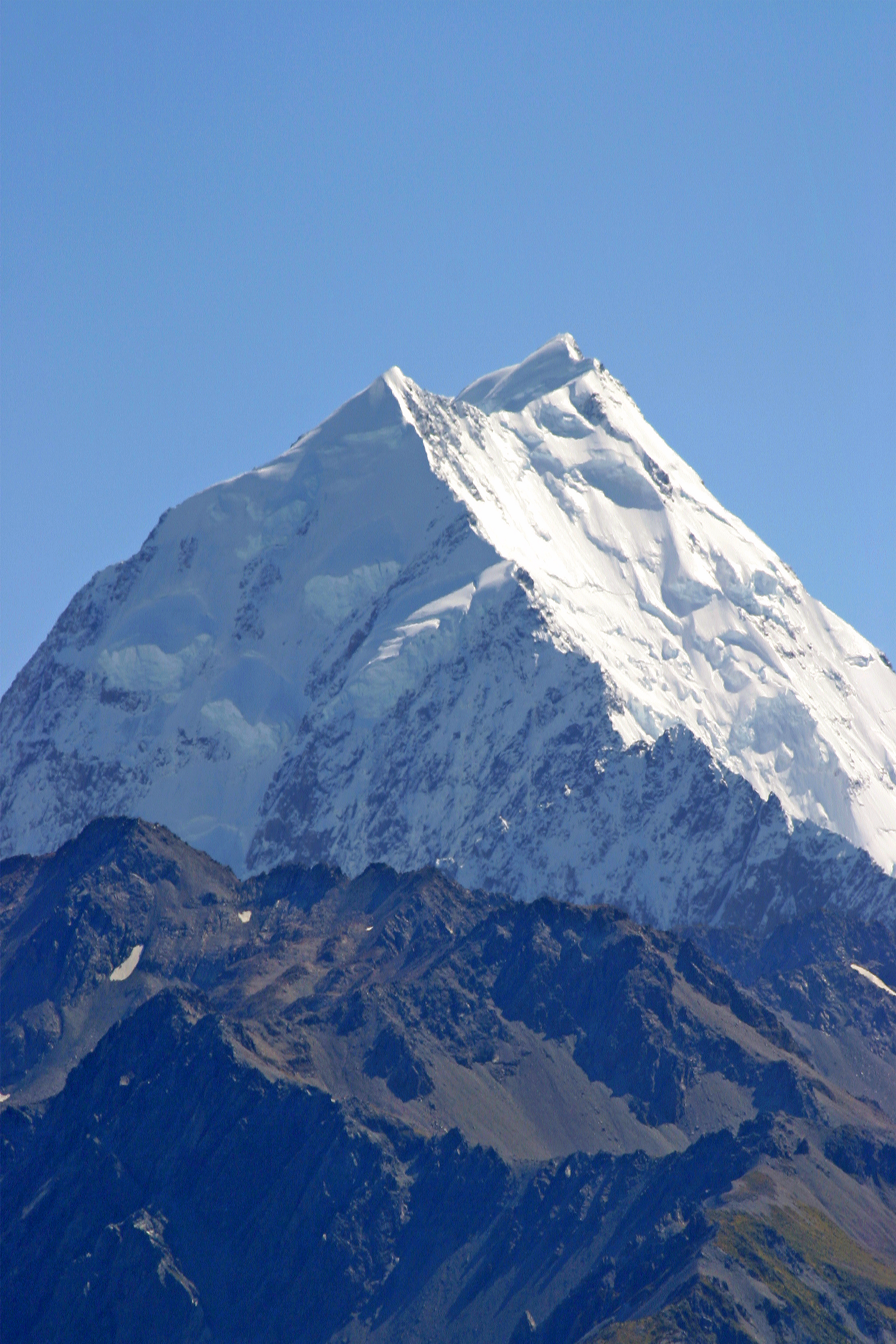
Aoraki / Mount Cook, the highest elevation in New Zealand is located inland of the Canterbury region

The area administered by the Canterbury Regional Council consists of all the river catchments on the east coast of the South Island from that of the Waiau Toa / Clarence River, north of Kaikōura, to that of the Waitaki River, in South Canterbury. It is New Zealand's largest region by area, with an area of 45,346 km^{2}.

Canterbury was formerly bounded in the north by the Conway River, to the west by the Southern Alps, and to the south by the Waitaki River. The area is commonly divided into North Canterbury (north of the Rakaia River to the Conway River), Mid Canterbury (from the Rakaia River to the Rangitata River), South Canterbury (south of the Rangitata River to the Waitaki River) and Christchurch City.

== Climate ==
Climate data for Canterbury
Month	Jan	Feb	Mar	Apr	May	Jun	Jul	Aug	Sep	Oct	Nov	Dec	Year
Record high °C (°F)	40.2 (104.4)	42.4 (108.3)	36.0 (96.8)	30.2 (86.4)	29.7 (85.5)	24.8 (76.6)	24.1 (75.4)	26.3 (79.3)	30.0 (86.0)	32.0 (89.6)	36.2 (97.2)	36.1 (97.0)	42.4 (108.3)
Mean daily maximum °C (°F)	21.7 (71.1)	21.4 (70.5)	19.5 (67.1)	16.5 (61.7)	13.1 (55.6)	10.3 (50.5)	9.5 (49.1)	11.0 (51.8)	13.8 (56.8)	15.9 (60.6)	17.9 (64.2)	19.9 (67.8)	15.9 (60.6)
Daily mean °C (°F)	16.0 (60.8)	15.8 (60.4)	14.0 (57.2)	11.1 (52.0)	8.1 (46.6)	5.5 (41.9)	4.8 (40.6)	6.2 (43.2)	8.5 (47.3)	10.5 (50.9)	12.4 (54.3)	14.5 (58.1)	10.6 (51.1)
Mean daily minimum °C (°F)	10.3 (50.5)	10.2 (50.4)	8.6 (47.5)	5.8 (42.4)	3.2 (37.8)	0.8 (33.4)	0.2 (32.4)	1.4 (34.5)	3.3 (37.9)	5.2 (41.4)	7.0 (44.6)	9.1 (48.4)	5.4 (41.7)
Record low °C (°F)	−2.3 (27.9)	−0.8 (30.6)	−4.4 (24.1)	−5.3 (22.5)	−7.2 (19.0)	−21.0 (−5.8)	−21.0 (−5.8)	−11.4 (11.5)	−8.0 (17.6)	−7.6 (18.3)	−5.9 (21.4)	−4.2 (24.4)	−21.0 (−5.8)
Source: Weatherbase

== Demographics ==
Canterbury Region covers 44,503.60 km^{2} (17,182.94 sq mi). Statistics New Zealand estimates the population of Canterbury is 698,200 as of June 2025, which gives a population density of 15.7 people per km^{2}. The region is home to 13.1% of New Zealand's population.

Historical population
Year	Pop.	±% p.a.
1991	438,171	—
1996	468,039	+1.33%
2001	481,431	+0.57%
2006	521,832	+1.62%
2013	539,433	+0.48%
2018	599,694	+2.14%
2023	651,027	+1.66%

Canterbury Region had a population of 651,027 in the 2023 New Zealand census, an increase of 51,333 people (8.6%) since the 2018 census, and an increase of 111,594 people (20.7%) since the 2013 census. There were 322,038 males, 326,082 females and 2,907 people of other genders in 251,661 dwellings. 3.7% of people identified as LGBTIQ+. The median age was 39.1 years (compared with 38.1 years nationally). There were 113,751 people (17.5%) aged under 15 years, 125,919 (19.3%) aged 15 to 29, 297,834 (45.7%) aged 30 to 64, and 113,520 (17.4%) aged 65 or older.

Of those at least 15 years old, 101,367 (18.9%) people had a bachelor's or higher degree, 279,984 (52.1%) had a post-high school certificate or diploma, and 124,818 (23.2%) people exclusively held high school qualifications. The median income was $41,400, compared with $41,500 nationally. 57,885 people (10.8%) earned over $100,000 compared to 12.1% nationally. The employment status of those at least 15 was that 274,113 (51.0%) people were employed full-time, 79,245 (14.7%) were part-time, and 12,546 (2.3%) were unemployed.

=== Urban areas ===
Largest cities or towns in Canterbury Statistics New Zealand June 2025 estimate
Rank		Territorial authority	Pop.
1	Christchurch	Christchurch City	407,800
2	Rolleston	Selwyn District	34,100
3	Timaru	Timaru District	29,300
4	Ashburton	Ashburton District	21,600
5	Rangiora	Waimakariri District	19,300
6	Kaiapoi	Waimakariri District	13,700
7	Lincoln	Selwyn District	12,100
8	Prebbleton	Selwyn District	5,750
9	Woodend	Waimakariri District	5,470
10	Temuka	Timaru District	4,760

=== Culture and identity ===
People could identify as more than one ethnicity. The results were 80.3% European (Pākehā); 10.6% Māori; 3.7% Pasifika; 13.3% Asian; 1.6% Middle Eastern, Latin American and African New Zealanders (MELAA); and 2.5% other, which includes people giving their ethnicity as "New Zealander". English was spoken by 96.3%, Māori language by 2.1%, Samoan by 1.0% and other languages by 13.8%. No language could be spoken by 2.0% (e.g. too young to talk). New Zealand Sign Language was known by 0.6%. The percentage of people born overseas was 24.6, compared with 28.8% nationally.

Religious affiliations were 32.2% Christian, 1.7% Hindu, 1.0% Islam, 0.3% Māori religious beliefs, 0.8% Buddhist, 0.5% New Age, 0.1% Jewish, and 1.7% other religions. People who answered that they had no religion were 55.1%, and 6.8% of people did not answer the census question.

Largest groups of overseas-born residents
Nationality	Population (2018)
England	28,719
Philippines	13,650
Mainland China	11,553
Australia	10,428
India	8,823
South Africa	6,195
Scotland	3,798
Fiji	3,672
United States	3,483
Samoa	3,339

In the 2013 census, just under 20 percent of Canterbury's population was born overseas, compared to 25 percent for New Zealand as a whole. The British Isles remains the largest region of origin, accounting for 36.5 percent of the overseas-born population in Canterbury. Around a quarter of Canterbury's overseas-born population at the 2013 Census had been living in New Zealand for less than five years, and 11 percent had been living in New Zealand for less than two years (i.e. they moved to New Zealand after the 2011 Christchurch earthquake).

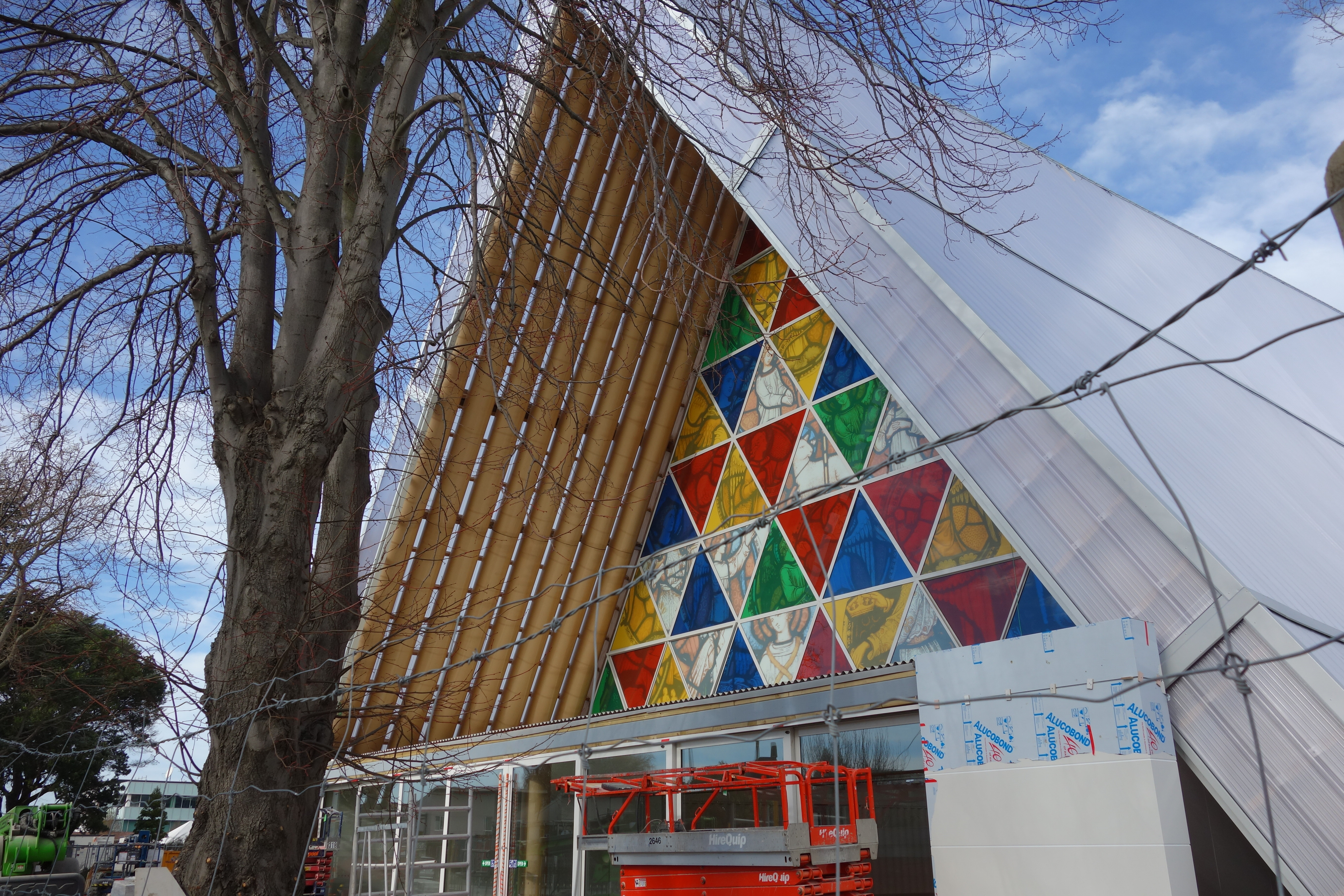
The Cardboard Cathedral in Christchurch opened in August 2013 as the transitional pro-cathedral for the Anglican Diocese of Christchurch. Anglicans make up 14.8 percent of Canterbury's population.

Anglicanism is the largest Christian denomination in Canterbury with 14.8 percent affiliating, while Catholicism is the second-largest with 12.7 percent affiliating.

Ethnic groups of Canterbury residents, 2006–18 census
Ethnicity	2006 census		2013 census		2018 census		2023 census	
Ethnicity	Number	%	Number	%	Number	%	Number	%
European	393,219	77.4	448,650	86.9	494,340	82.4	522,498	80.3
Māori	36,669	7.2	41,910	8.1	56,298	9.4	69,060	10.6
Pacific peoples	10,926	2.2	12,720	2.5	18,927	3.2	23,868	3.7
Asian	29,172	5.7	35,847	6.9	66,672	11.1	86,430	13.3
Middle Eastern/Latin American/African	3,363	0.7	4,374	0.8	7,314	1.2	10,299	1.6
Other	70,254	13.8	10,236	2.0	8,307	1.4	8,205	1.3
Total people stated	508,185		516,360		599,694		651,027	
Not elsewhere included	13,650	2.6	23,076	4.3	0	0.0	0	0.0

== Economy ==
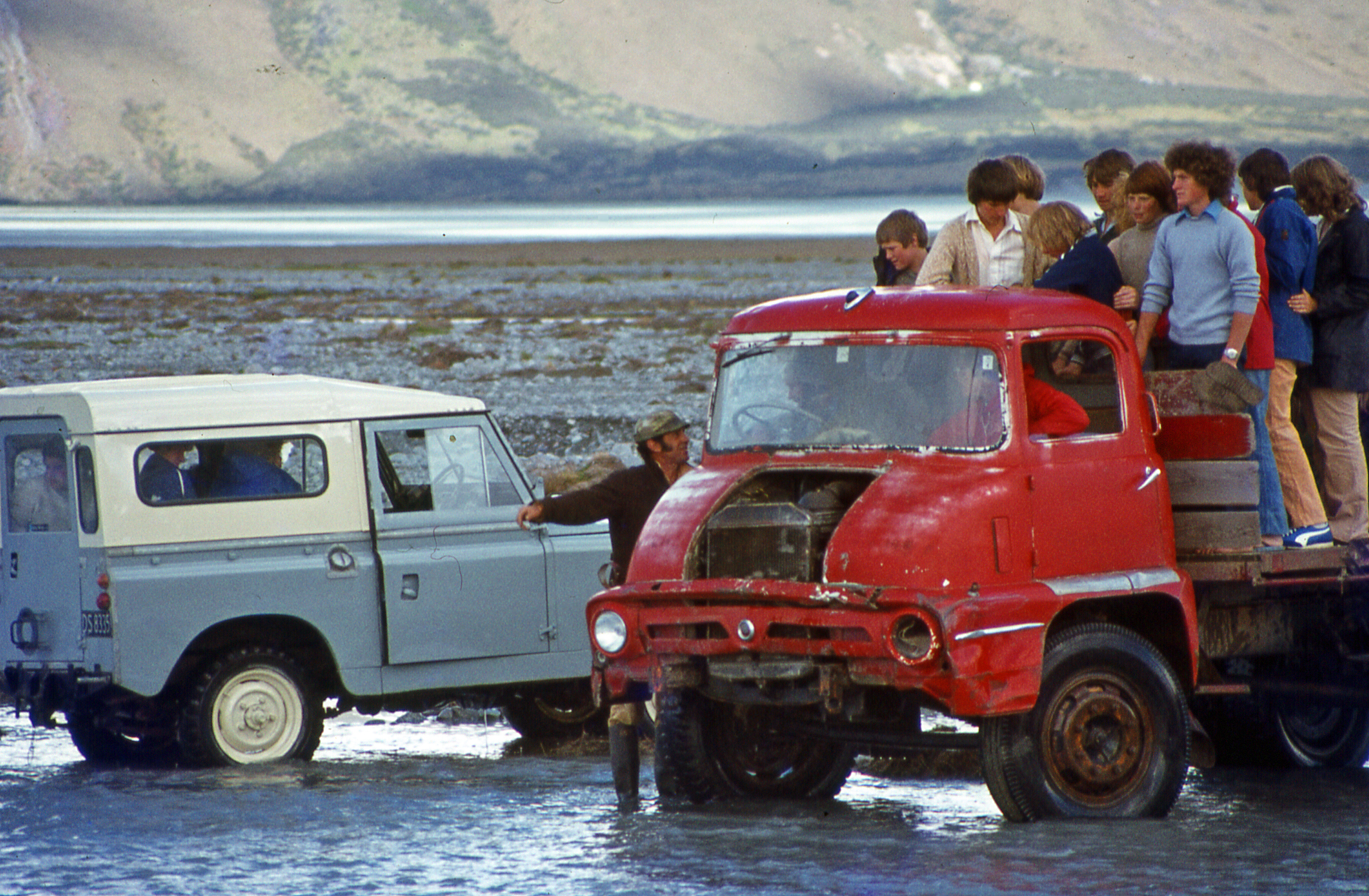
Crossing the Macauley River, Lilybank Station, Canterbury, New Zealand, 1977.

The gross domestic product (GDP) of the Canterbury Region was estimated at NZ$44.2 billion in the year to March 2022, representing 12.4% of New Zealand's national GDP. The regional GDP per filled job was $126,733, 4.6% below the national average of $132,815.

For the year ended March 2022, the manufacturing industry was the largest contributor to the Canterbury regional economy, at $4.1 billion. Primary manufacturing (the process of creating a product from raw materials) represented $2.48 billion of the total. Manufacturing industries in the region employed 10.6% of the filled jobs in the region. The construction sector represented the next highest category of regional GDP, at $3.67 billion, followed by professional, scientific and technical services at $3.64 billion.

As of the 2023 census, the largest industries in Canterbury by number of workers were construction (37,200), manufacturing (35,700), professional, scientific and technical services (34,200), health care and social assistance (32,800), and retail trade (32,500).

=== Agriculture ===
Agriculture contributed $3.26 billion to the regional economy in the year ended March 2022. The agriculture sector is diversified into dairy farming, sheep farming and horticulture particularly viticulture. The strength of the region's agricultural economy is displayed every November at the Canterbury A&P Show. The show coincides with the regional anniversary day and Cup Week. During the interwar period, agricultural productivity was boosted by the introduction of mechanization, lime and the improvement of seed stocks. Canterbury is also New Zealand's main producer of cereal crops such as wheat, barley and oats. As of 2002, the region produced 60.7% of the nation's supply of wheat, 51.1% of its barley stocks and 43.7% of its supply of oats.

Canterbury has 25,065 hectares of horticultural land, the largest area in New Zealand. The largest crops are potatoes (4,330 ha), peas and beans (2,700 ha), wine grapes (1,770 ha), berries (1,100 ha), and onions (1,000 ha). The region produces half of the New Zealand's mushrooms, nuts and berries.

The region's viticulture industry was established by French settlers in Akaroa. Since then, wine-growing is concentrated into two regions: Waipara and Burnham. Recently, there have been vintages from plantings from Kurow further to the south. White wine has typically predominated in Canterbury from Riesling, Sauvignon blanc, Chardonnay, Gewürztraminer, and to a lesser extent Pinot blanc and Pinot gris. Pinot noir has had some success in the province, particularly in Waipara.

== Environment ==
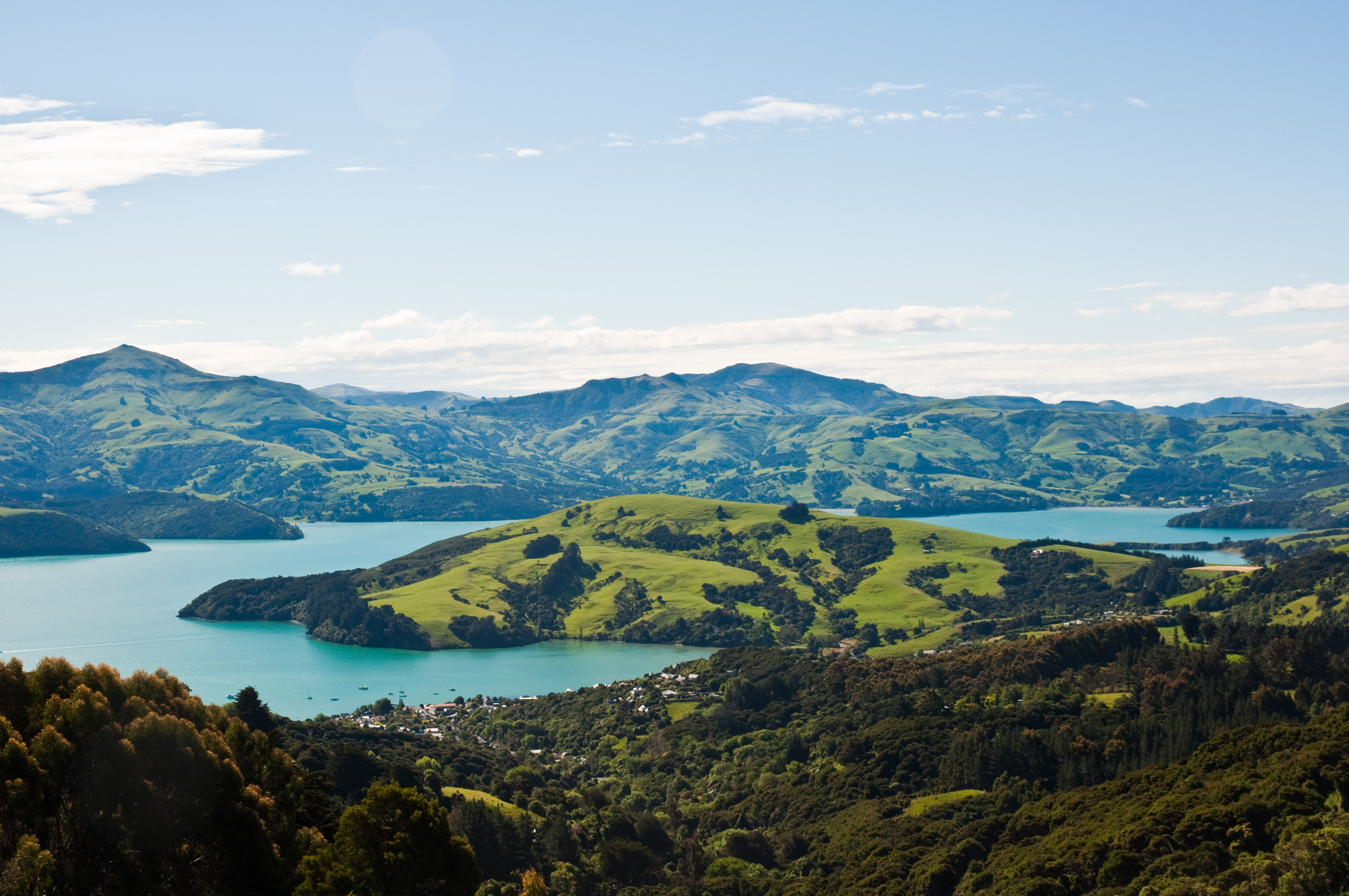
Upper Akaroa Harbour

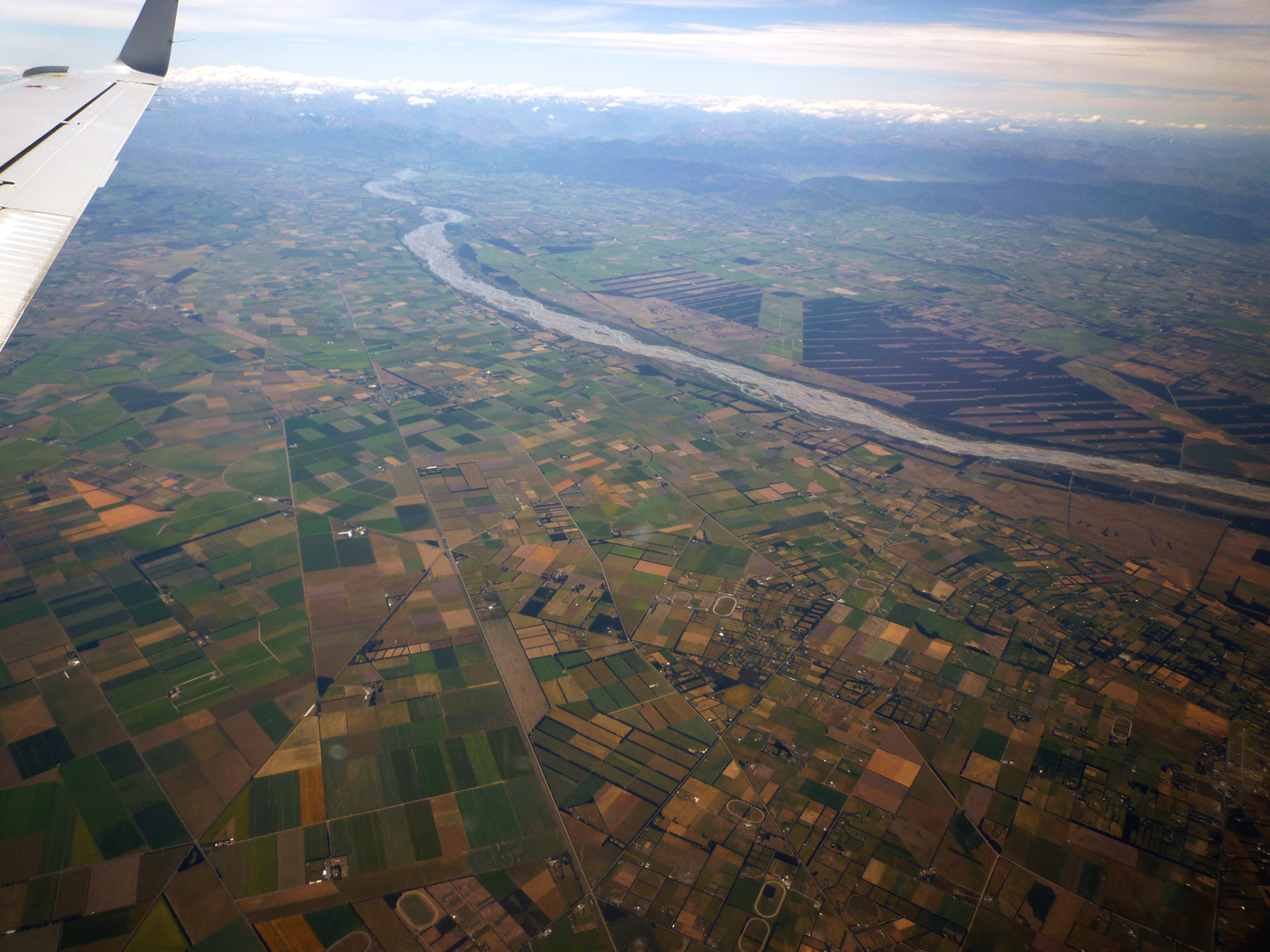
Canterbury Plains

Like much of the Canterbury-Otago tussock grasslands the Canterbury Plains have been highly modified since human settlement and now support a large agricultural industry. Prior to the arrival of Māori settlers in the 13th century, much of the modern Canterbury Region was covered in scrub and beech forests. Forest fires destroyed much of the original forest cover which was succeeded by tussock grassland. By the 19th century, only ten percent of this forest cover remained, and the European settlers introduced several new exotic grass, lupin, pine and macrocarpa that gradually supplanted the native vegetation. Much of the native vegetation was isolated to the alpine zones and Banks Peninsula. From a minimum of about one percent of its original forest cover in circa 1900, the amount of forest on Banks Peninsula has increased.

The amount of dairy farming is increasing with a corresponding increase in demand for water. Water use is now becoming a contentious issue in Canterbury. Lowland rivers and streams are generally polluted and some of the aquifers are being overdrawn. The Central Plains Water scheme is a proposal for water storage that has attracted much controversy. The Canterbury Water Management Strategy is one of the many means being used to address the water issue.

The Canterbury mudfish (kowaro) is an endangered species that is monitored by the Department of Conservation.

== Government and politics ==
=== Local government ===
The Canterbury Region is administered by the Canterbury Regional Council. The area includes ten territorial authorities, including Christchurch City Council and part of the Waitaki District, the other part of which is in Otago. Following the local government reform of 1989, Kaikōura District was part of the Nelson-Marlborough Region. That region was later abolished and replaced with three unitary authorities. Kaikōura was too small to function as an independent unitary authority and was moved under the jurisdiction of the Canterbury Regional Council in 1992. However, Kaikōura remains part of Marlborough in the minds of many people. In 2006, the Banks Peninsula District was merged into Christchurch City following a 2005 referendum.

=== National government ===
The Canterbury Region is covered by ten general electorates and one Māori electorate. The city of Christchurch as a whole consists of five of these electorates, while the electorate of Waimakariri contains a mix of Christchurch and exurban Canterbury. The Banks Peninsula, Ilam, and Waimakariri electorates are currently held by members of the governing National Party (as part of the coalition-led Sixth National Government of New Zealand) Vanessa Weenink, Hamish Campbell, and Matt Doocey. Meanwhile, the Christchurch Central, Christchurch East, and Wigram electorates are currently held by opposition (Labour Party) members Duncan Webb, Reuben Davidson, and Megan Woods respectively.

In contrast to Christchurch, much of the surrounding Canterbury Region is dominated by the National Party due to its ties to rural farming and business interests. The large Kaikōura electorate covers all of the Marlborough Region and northern Canterbury and is represented by National MP Stuart Smith. The substantial Waitaki electorate, held by National MP Miles Anderson, covers most of South Canterbury and neighbouring North Otago. Rangitata and Selwyn are held by National members James Meager and Nicola Grigg respectively.

Under the Māori electorates system, Canterbury is part of the large Te Tai Tonga electorate which covers the entire South Island, the surrounding islands and most of Wellington in the North Island. It is currently held by Tākuta Ferris of Te Pāti Māori.

Judicially, the region is served by four District Courts at Christchurch, Ashburton, Timaru and Kaikōura, and two High Courts at Christchurch and Timaru. The Christchurch High Court also hosts a divisional court of the Court of Appeal.

== Transport ==
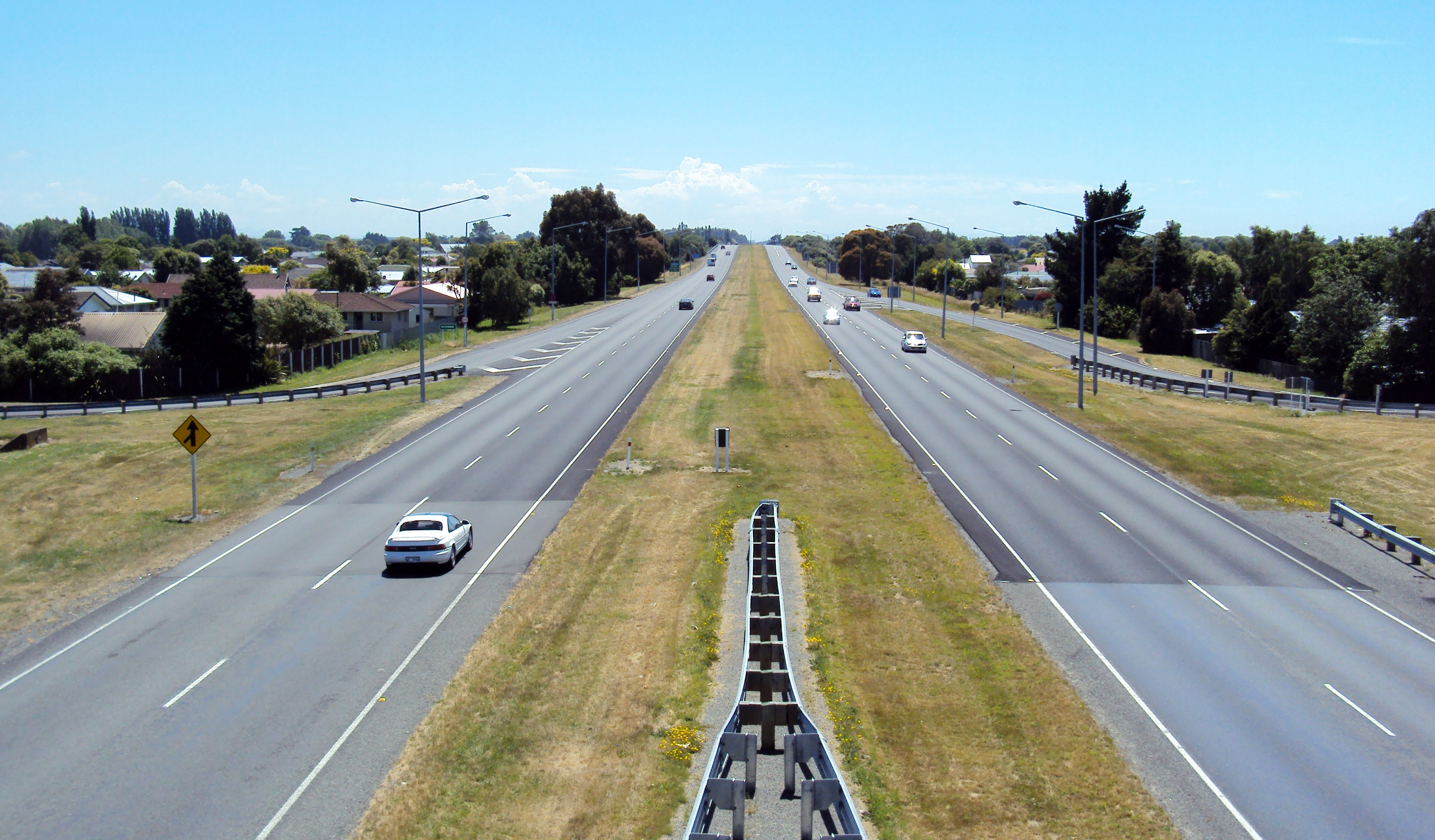
Christchurch Northern Motorway

State Highway 1 runs the length of Canterbury and is the region's main north–south highway, connecting north to Blenheim and the Cook Strait ferry terminal at Picton and south to Oamaru, Dunedin and Invercargill.

Public transport in Canterbury is planned and managed by Environment Canterbury. It provides urban public transport services in Greater Christchurch and Timaru, while the Greater Christchurch network also links Christchurch with nearby towns including Rolleston, Rangiora, Kaiapoi and Lincoln. Metro also operates the Diamond Harbour ferry between Lyttelton and Diamond Harbour.

Lyttelton Port Company is the largest port in the South Island.

Christchurch is the region's main rail hub. Long-distance passenger rail services from Christchurch railway station include the TranzAlpine to Greymouth and the Coastal Pacific to Picton.

Christchurch International Airport, located in Harewood on the north-western outskirts of Christchurch, is the region's main airport and has regular domestic and international services. Richard Pearse Airport near Timaru is the main airport for South Canterbury, with daily flights to Wellington.

== Education ==
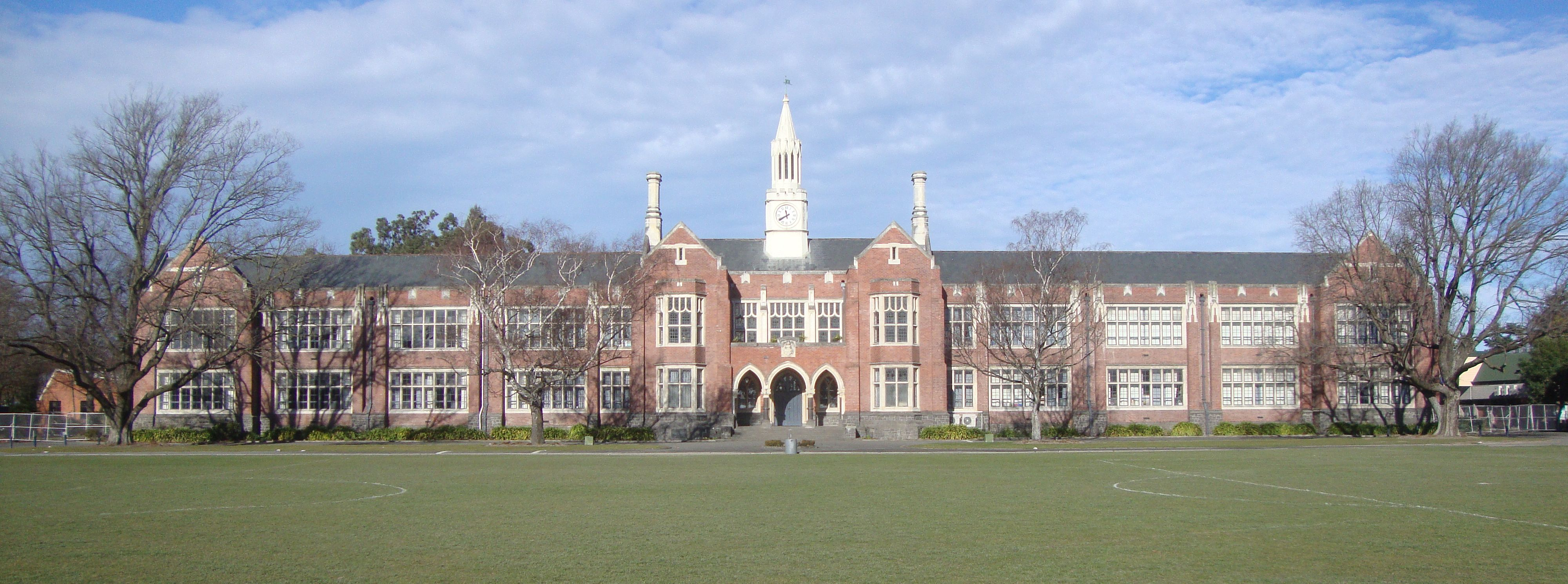
Christchurch Boys' High School

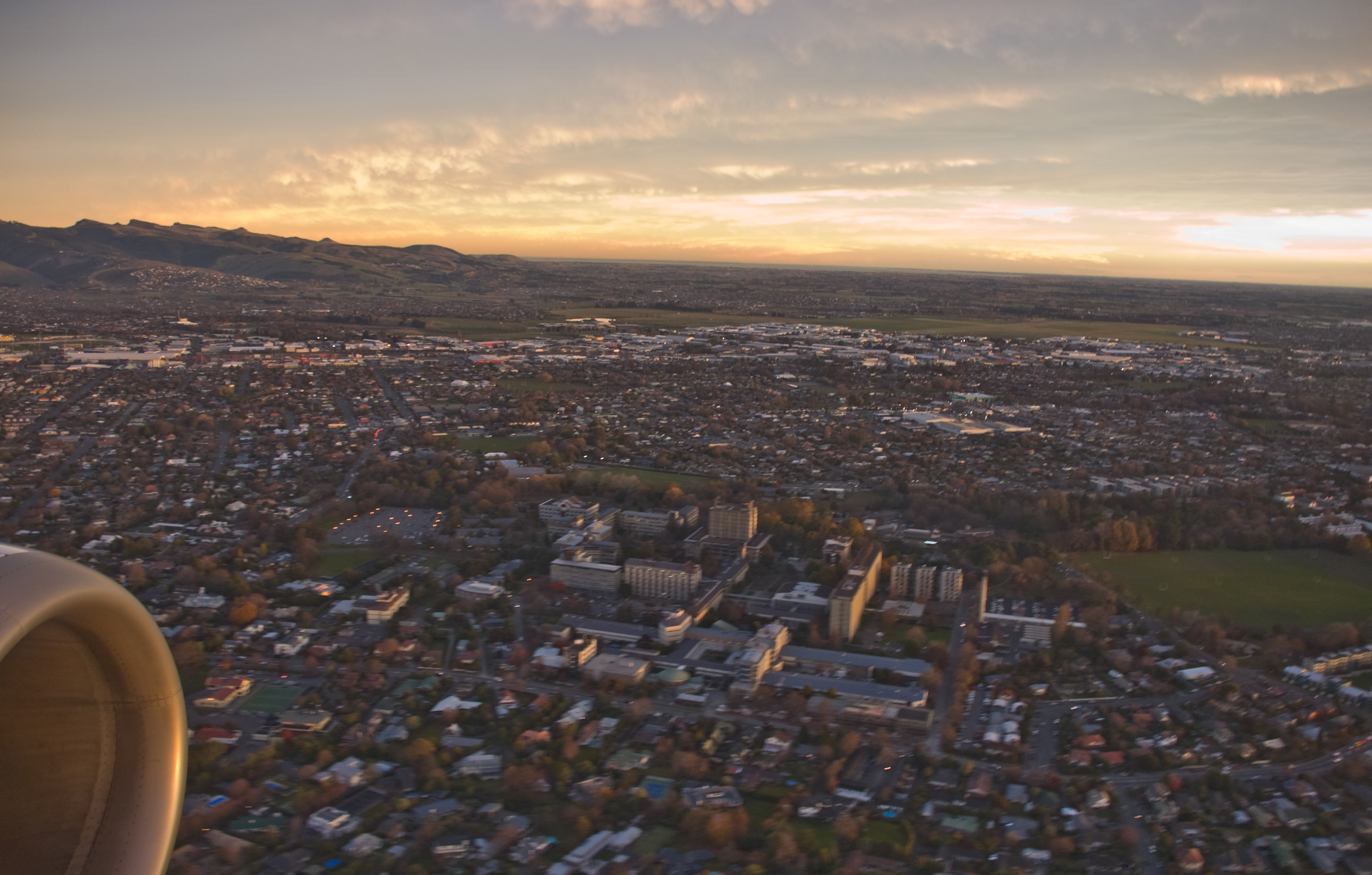
University of Canterbury

Canterbury had 292 primary and secondary schools with 103,787 students in 2024. On key Ministry of Education indicators, the region performed slightly above the national average: 98.4% of children starting school had attended early childhood education, compared with 96.8% nationally, and 78.1% of school leavers attained NCEA Level 2 or above, compared with 76.1% nationally.

The region's tertiary institutions include the University of Canterbury in Christchurch, Lincoln University in Lincoln, and Ara Institute of Canterbury, which operates campuses in Christchurch and Timaru. Te Wānanga o Aotearoa also has Christchurch locations at Te Mouri and Anginuku.

== Sport ==
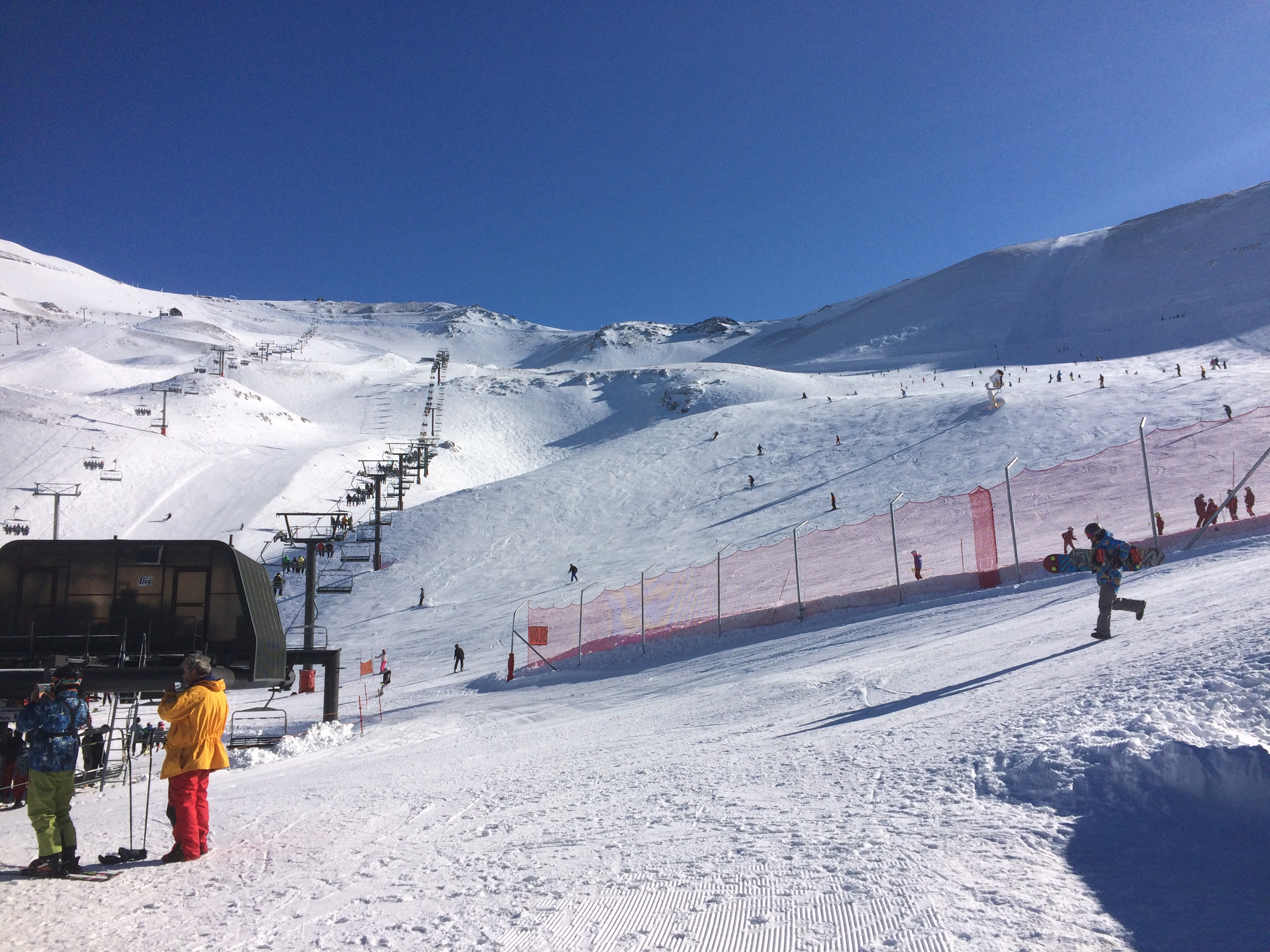
Skiing at Mount Hutt

Sport in Canterbury has developed from the time of the initial settlement by British migrants, and remains an important part of community life. Cricket and rugby union have been popular team sports since the early years of settlement, with the first cricket club established in Christchurch in 1851, and the first rugby club in 1863. Interest in organised sports has diversified and now includes a wide range of codes. In 2022, the top five sporting codes in Canterbury based on club membership were netball, touch rugby, rugby union, golf and cricket.

There are around 1,200 sports clubs and associations in Christchurch, and in 2022 there were 140,000 affiliated members. Most of the sporting codes remain amateur, and rely upon volunteers as administrators and officials. However, there are some professional teams. Notable teams representing Christchurch or the Canterbury Region include the Mainland Tactix (netball), Crusaders (rugby) and the Canterbury Kings (cricket).

The Crusaders, who play in the Super Rugby competition, are based in Christchurch. They represent Canterbury and other provinces of the upper South Island. They were formerly known as the Canterbury Crusaders. In provincial rugby, Canterbury is represented by three unions; Canterbury, Mid Canterbury and South Canterbury. For historical reasons, players from Kaikōura District still play for the Marlborough Rugby Union, which is part of the Tasman Provincial team (Nelson/Marlborough Unions combined). Other sporting teams include the Mainland Tactix (netball), Canterbury United FC (football) and Canterbury Rams (basketball).

Christchurch has hosted many international competitions including championship events. A particularly notable international event was the 1974 Commonwealth Games.

There are many outdoor sportsgrounds and a variety of indoor venues. Christchurch City Council maintains 110 sportsgrounds across Christchurch City and Banks Peninsula. The sports venues Lancaster Park and Queen Elizabeth II Park were damaged beyond repair in the 2011 Christchurch earthquake, and were demolished. New facilities built to replace those damaged in the earthquake include the Ngā Puna Wai Sports Hub, the Parakiore Recreation and Sport Centre — an aquatic and indoor sports venue scheduled to open in 2025, and a multi–purpose covered stadium Te Kaha seating 30,000 spectators that is expected to be complete by April 2026.

== Film location ==
Canterbury has been a filming location for a range of international and national TV shows and films. Most notable are the locations used in the filming of The Lord of the Rings with the fictional city of Edoras, Rohan, being set on Mount Sunday, as well as Helm's deep backdrop, several miles down the valley. For Return of the King the battle of the Pelennor Fields private farmland near Twizel was used. Canterbury also appeared in The Hobbit trilogy with Lake Pukaki being the setting for Laketown.

Other productions have been The Chronicles of Narnia: The Lion, the Witch and the Wardrobe with Flock Hill being used for the battle of Beruna. Slow West, Bookworm and Mulan used locations in the Mackenzie basin, with Mulan also using Omarama Clay Cliffs in a scene. Plates from the TranzAlpine were used for the Murder on the Orient Express (2017) to double as the Swiss Alps on a sound stage in the UK. And Christchurch itself has featured in productions like Heavenly Creatures, The Frighteners, Z for Zachariah and Dark City: The Cleaner.

== See also ==
- 2010 Canterbury earthquake
- February 2011 Christchurch earthquake
- June 2011 Christchurch earthquake
- November 2016 Kaikōura earthquake
- Water pollution in the Canterbury Region

== Sources cited ==
- Wilson, John (2013). Contextual Historical Overview for Christchurch City – Revised 2013 (PDF) (2nd ed.). Christchurch City Council.
