= Sharefarming =

Agricultural economic system

Sharefarming is an umbrella term for various systems of farming in which sharefarmers make use of agricultural assets they do not own in return for a percentage share of the products.

Occasionally, the term sharefarmer is used to denote a farmer who receives a wage (fixed per hour, week, month, or area) from the landlord, although such a person is normally considered a tenant farmer or farm labourer. Two common implementations of the sharefarming concept are sharecropping and sharemilking, although it has been applied to other sorts of agricultural assets. Another form, known as métayage or mezzadria, was, and remains, practiced in southern France, in Italy, and in Canada.

Sharefarming was common in colonial Africa, in Scotland, and in Ireland. While sharefarming as practiced in many poor parts of the world can be seen as a form of oppression similar to feudal serfdom, it is not inherently exploitative.

== Métayage ==
The meaning of the term métayage has shifted over the centuries from one in which farmers share in the crops they harvest to one in which they share in the profits from their sale. (The landlords of a so-called métairie were known as bailleurs or concedenti and the sharecroppers as prendeurs or mezzadri.)

Métayage of the older sort, re-christened as colonat partiaire, was practiced in Africa and in the overseas departments of France until modern times; its last vestiges vanished from Réunion in 2006. On the other hand, métayage as it is defined today remains one of the options for running a farm and is given a legal backbone in the Code rural, livre IV, as well as in several laws of the European Union.

Métayage, under its modern-day meaning, remains common in Canada, and in fact compares very favourably to other farming arrangements on the basis of taxation. Sharefarming in the broad sense finds good use where individual farmers prefer not to have complete responsibility for agricultural assets such as the land or livestock, and in such applications it is not considered exploitative.

== Sharecropping ==
Sharecropping as historically practiced in the United States during the Reconstruction era (late 19th-century) is one of the most common implementations of sharefarming.

In practice, sharefarmers work land which they do not own in return for varying portions of the total profit. In many cases where it is practiced in very poor farming communities it is considered an exploitative model. Sharecropping began after the Civil War and ended between the 1930s and the 1940s because the introduction of machines made farming easier, and landowners no longer needed actual people to work the fields.

== Sharemilking ==
Sharemilking is the application of the sharefarming concept to the dairy industry; it is particularly common in New Zealand but is not unheard of elsewhere. The specific arrangement to which the term sharemilking is understood (via synecdoche) to apply is less ambiguously known as herd-owning or fifty-fifty sharemilking.

Under 50:50 sharemilking, graziers (prendeurs) own their cattle and equipment outright, employ their own labourers, and preside over day-to-day operations at the grazing end of the arrangement (or their part thereof). Milking operations, meanwhile, are undertaken by shared sheds that loan out their labourers, equipment, and time in return for a 50% fee for services rendered. Land can be owned by the milking shed or by a bailleur, a third-party career landlord (both are types of rentier), but in a subversion of the typical rentier model, the grazier himself may own the land on which his cattle graze. This is ubiquitous on semi-sedentary métairies, where the economic model de facto straddles the line between rentier capitalism and commission sales.

Naïvely, milking sheds may be conceptualised as taking fifty per cent. profit in exchange for contributing fifty per cent. of capital and assuming fifty per cent. of risk. While this picture is complicated by the ubiquity of multilateral sharemilking arrangements, wherein a milking shed is shared by multiple prendeurs and extracts its usual and customary fee from each, the "50:50" moniker remains generally accurate from the milking shed's perspective.

This arrangement benefits both rentiers and prendeurs. In-house milking facilities tend to lie empty and unused for a good chunk of the day that could otherwise be spent doing productive (and thus profitable) work. Likewise, land that lies empty and ungrazed serves no purpose, but can be turned to profit landowners who own neither cattle nor milking shed.

Graziers participating in a sharemilking scheme have the opportunity to save money and bring their milking facility in-house if they so desire. Sharemilking can also aid graziers who aspire to own land but at present do not in acquiring it; those who have no desire to own land can instead acquire more cattle.

Variable order sharemilking, under which prendeurs do not own their own herd, and receive a lower percentage of the milk income, is identical to the French métairie but applied to dairy operations in New Zealand. Contract milking is similar to variable order sharemilking, the difference being that milkers are paid a fixed price per kilogram of milk solids rather than a proportion; this is enough to exclude it from métairie altogether.

Sharemilking contracts typically run from 1 June to 31 May; when sharemilkers take up new contracts, the herd is often shifted on what is known as "Gypsy Day".

The model is not exploitative, and over time, sharemilkers often slowly buy out the landholder, or alternatively use the system as a method to save for their own property. This practice helps dairy farmers anywhere who do not wish the burdens of owning their own land, as it allows them to focus their investment in livestock and equipment. Sharemilking also profits former dairy farmers who have given up their herds, by providing them with an income from rental of fields, pastures and barns.
