= Fish & Game New Zealand =

- Formation: 19 July 1990
- Purpose: Management of sports fish and gamebirds
- Headquarters: Wellington
- Location: New Zealand
- Website: fishandgame.org.nz/

Fish & Game New Zealand is the collective brand name of 12 regional fish and game councils and the New Zealand Fish and Game Council which administer sports fishing and gamebird resources in New Zealand (apart from within the Taupo Fishing District, administered by the Department of Conservation). Fish and game councils are regionally autonomous bodies (similar to district or regional councils, but with far fewer functions) governed by elected fish and game councillors, who are elected every three years by adult full season license-holders across the respective region. The New Zealand Fish and Game Council is made up of one representative from each of the regional councils. Councils employ managers and staff, and the New Zealand Fish and Game Council employs a director; the role is currently held by Bryce Johnson.

This model of user-pays, user-says fishery management is unique in the world, but has existed in New Zealand for close to 150 years. Fish and game councils are the successor of the New Zealand acclimatisation societies, which introduced many new species to New Zealand.

Fish and game councils are required by the Conservation Act 1987 to advocate for the interests of anglers and hunters in the statutory planning process. This advocacy role is vital as whilst fish and game councils manage species, they do not manage their habitats (for the most part). Habitats of sports fish and game-birds in New Zealand are the responsibility of various local and regional councils, and also the underlying landowner. Therefore, advocacy in the public planning processes that set the rules for these environments is an important role of Fish and Game.

Fish and game councils were set up under the Conservation Act 1987 with the statutory responsibility for the sports of freshwater sport fishing and game-bird hunting. They are funded almost entirely from the sale of hunting and fishing licenses, and receive no government funding. There is a large base of volunteer rangers (warranted officers under the Conservation Act 1987) who undertake compliance and enforcement work for the Councils.

Fish & Game started the high profile "dirty dairying" campaign to highlight the problems caused by intensification of dairy farming on the ecological health of New Zealand's fresh water environment. The campaign led to the creation of the Dairying and Clean Streams Accord, a voluntary agreement between Fonterra, the Ministry for the Environment, the Ministry of Agriculture and Forestry, and regional councils. In October 2015, Fish & Game resigned from the Land and Water Forum, a group set up by the government and made up of 50 environmental, recreational and industry groups. Johnson justified the move by claiming that the government had walked away from the collaborative approach, whilst the Minister of Conservation, Nick Smith, wondered "what had changed". The new director of Greenpeace Aotearoa New Zealand, Russel Norman, explained the move by Fish & Game having to watch pollution in waterways getting worse. In an editorial, The Press hinted at widespread dissatisfaction among the environmental groups on the Land and Water Forum, and wondered whether other groups would follow Fish & Game's lead to also resign from the forum.

== See also ==
- Hunting in New Zealand
