= List of cheesemakers =

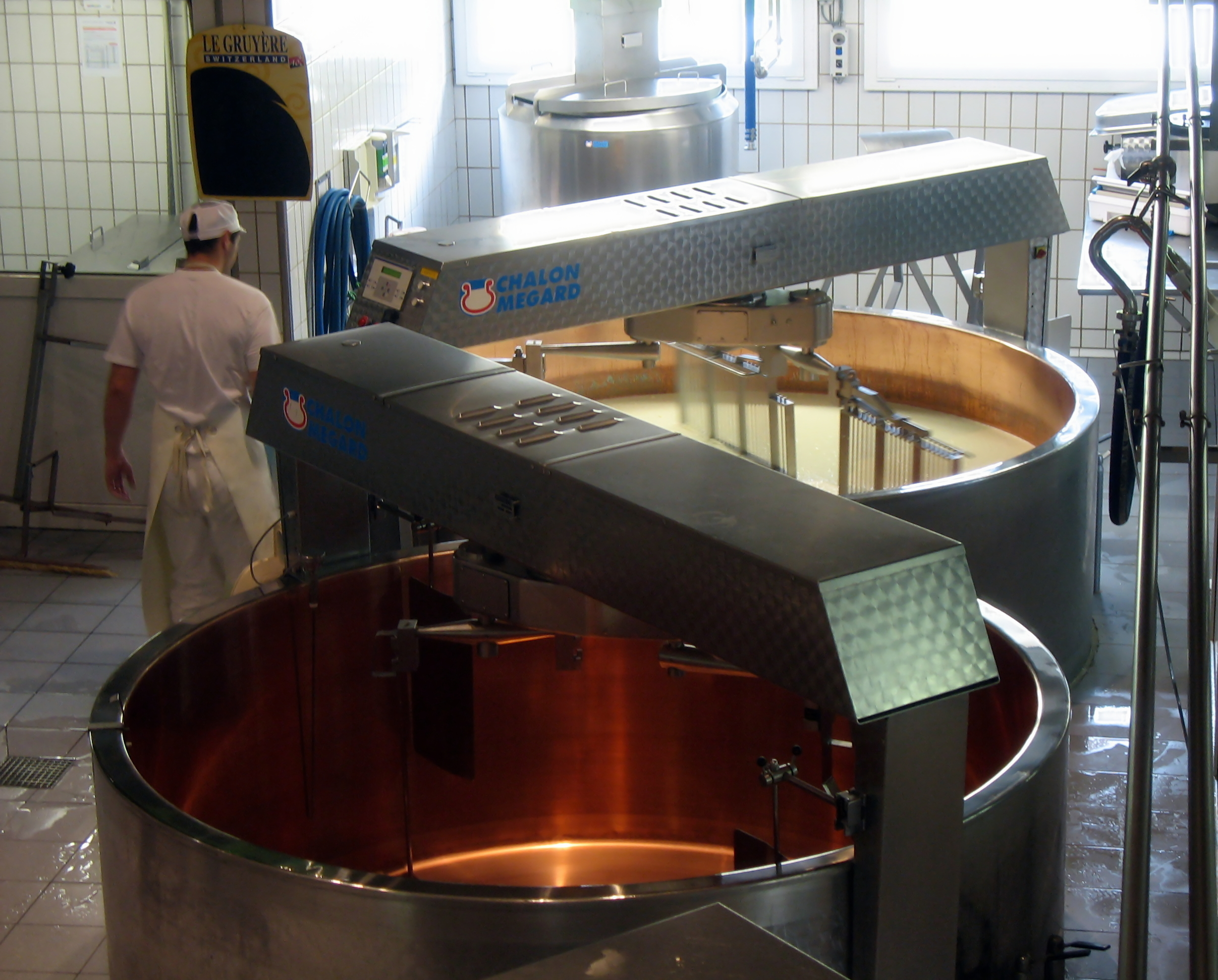
Production of Gruyère cheese at the cheesemaking factory of Gruyères, Canton of Fribourg, Switzerland

This is a list of notable cheesemakers. Cheesemakers are people or companies that make cheese, who have developed the knowledge and skills required to convert milk into cheese. Cheesemaking involves controlling precisely the types and amounts of ingredients used and the parameters of the cheesemaking process, to make specific types and qualities of cheese. The milk may be from a cow, goat, sheep or buffalo, although worldwide cow's milk is most commonly used. Cheesemakers also need to be skilled in grading cheese to assess quality, assessing defects and suitability for release, and cheese ripening. The craft of making cheese dates back at least 5,000 years. Archaeological evidence exists of Egyptian cheese being made in the ancient Egyptian civilizations.

== Cheesemakers ==
=== A ===
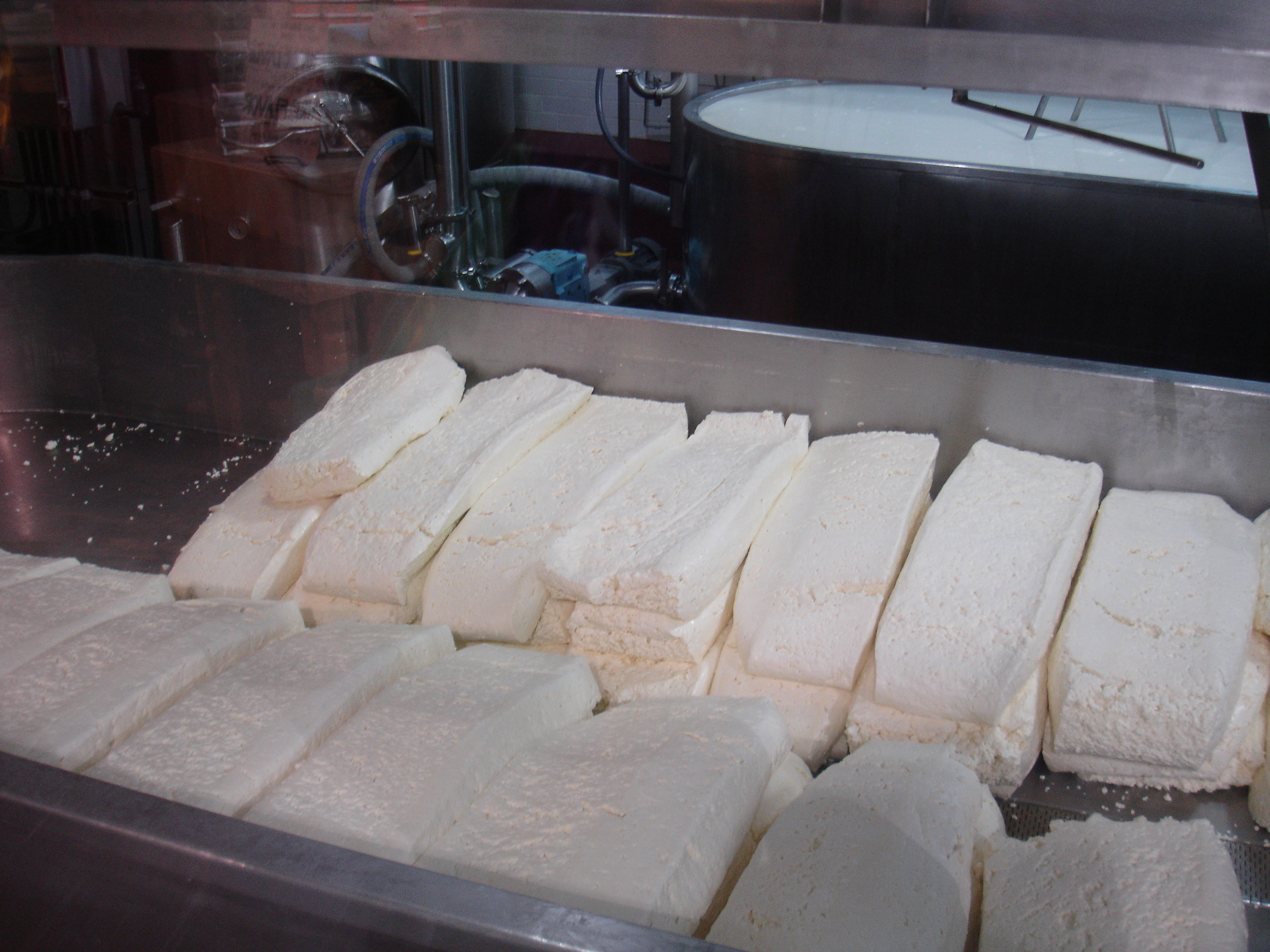
Cheese being prepared at Beecher's Handmade Cheese

- Aarong Dairy - A Bangladeshi social enterprise producing cheese and other dairy products.
- American Cheese Society – nonprofit organization that promotes the United States cheese industry and represents artisan cheesemakers
- Amul is an Indian dairy cooperative, based at Anand in the state of Gujarat, India.
- Arla Foods is a Danish dairy cooperative, based in Aarhus, Denmark. It is the 6th largest dairy producer globally and the largest in terms of organic milk volume. Formed in 2000 by a merger with Danish MD Foods and Swedish Arla, the company now is owned by more than 12.000 farmers in more than six countries. Most famous brands are Castello, Puck, Lurpak, Kaergaarden.

=== B ===
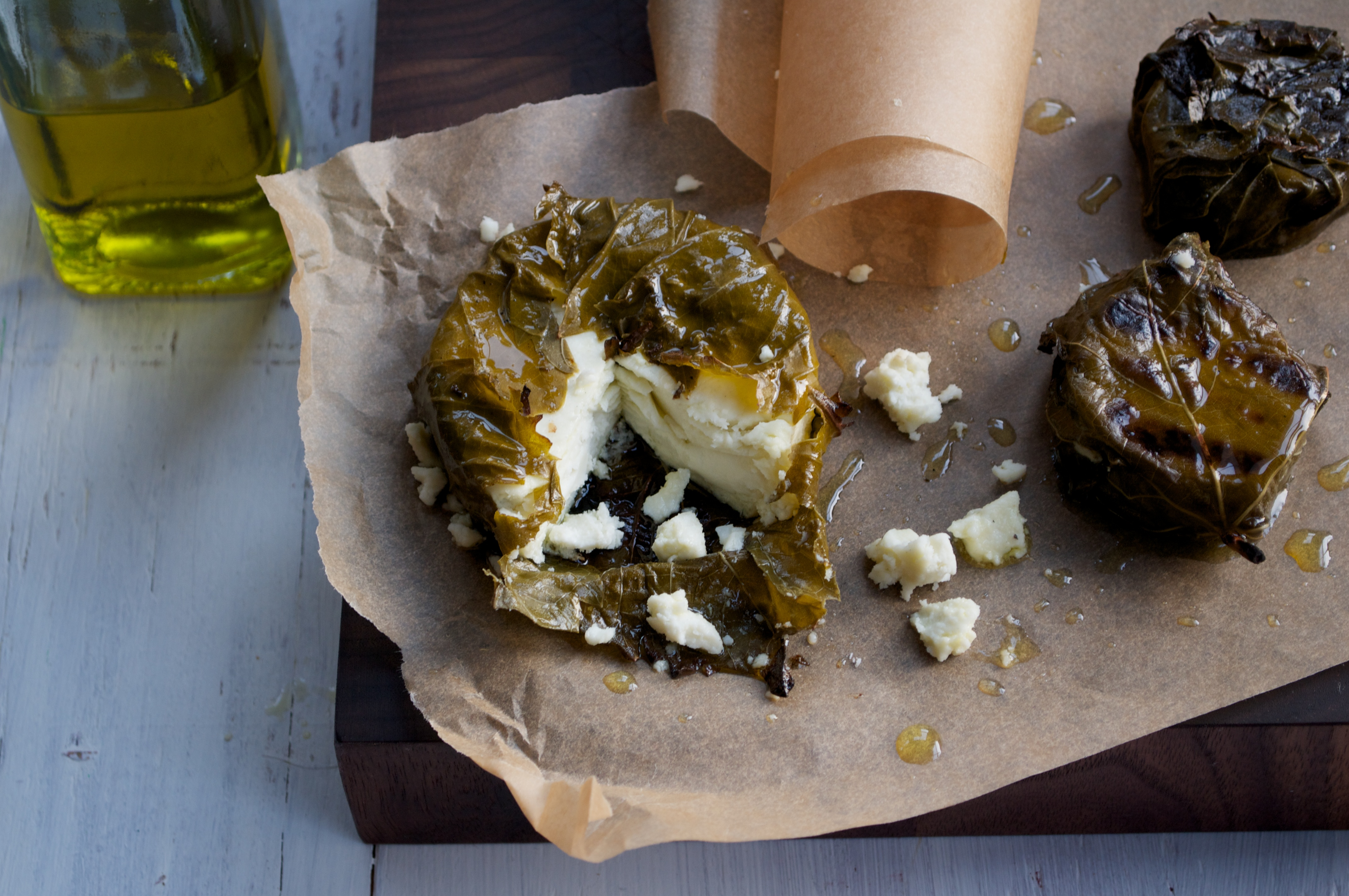
Belle Chevre's Greek Kiss cheese, a goat cheese wrapped in grape leaves

- Beecher's Handmade Cheese – artisan cheesemaker and retail shop based in the Pike Place Market, Seattle, Washington, United States.
- Bega Cheese
- BelGioioso Cheese
- Bel Group
- Belle Chevre – artisan goat cheese maker in rural Alabama. It was established in 1986 and is located in Limestone County, Alabama near Elkmont.
- Boar's Head Provision Company
- Bothwell Cheese – independently owned Canadian cheesemaker, it produces over 30 varieties of cheddar, mozzarella, smoked, traditional, and specialty cheeses.

=== C ===
The Cabot village creamery was built in 1893

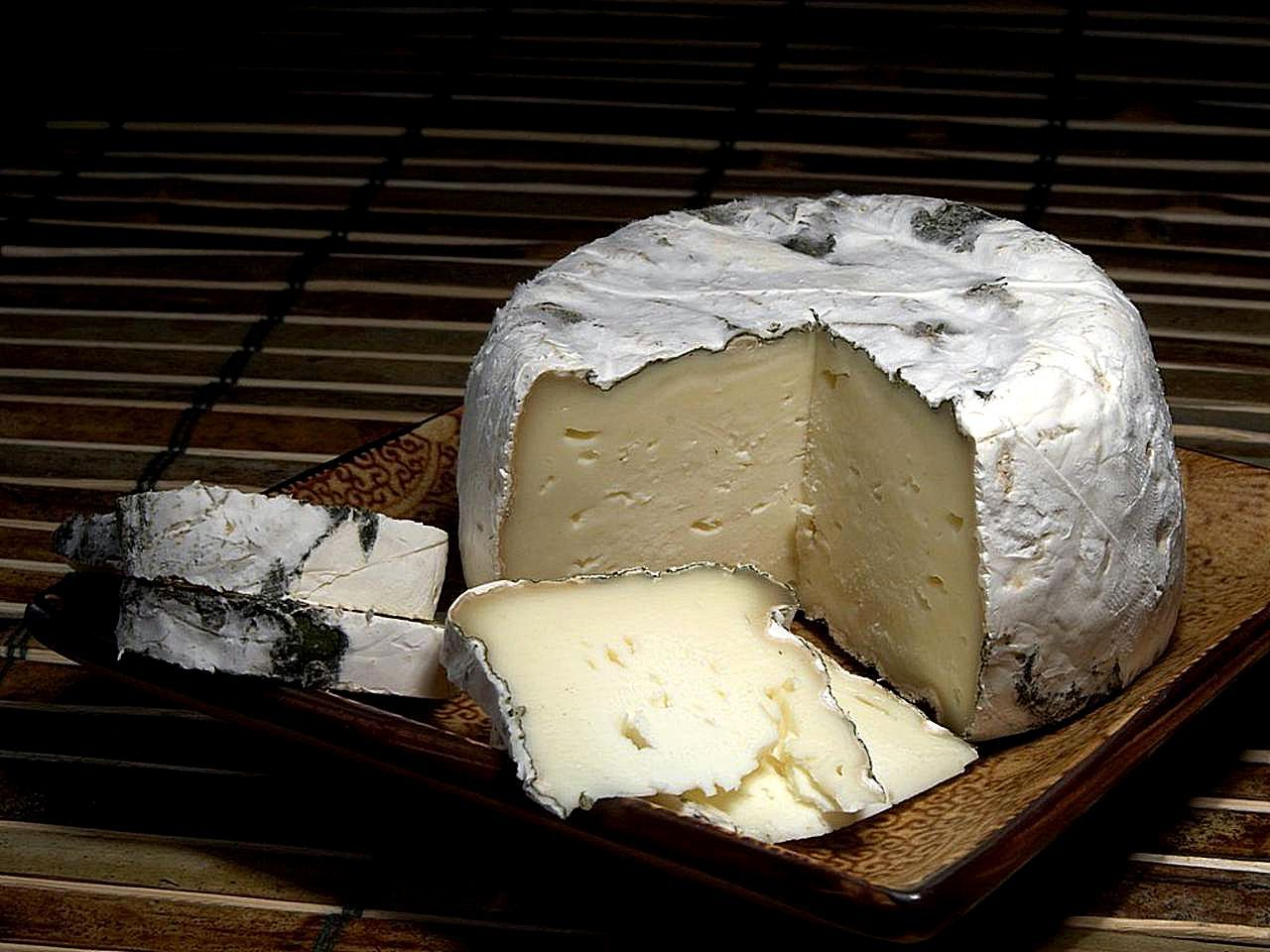
St. Pat cheese, made by Cowgirl Creamery

- Cabot Creamery – American dairy agricultural marketing cooperative, wholly owned by the Agri-Mark Cooperative. Wine Spectator magazine listed Cabot cloth-bound cheddar as one of "100 great cheeses" of the world in 2008.
- Capriole Goat Cheese – artisan goat cheese producer in Greenville, Indiana, United States.
- Caws Cenarth – cheese manufacturer in Boncath, Wales, established by Gwynfor and Thelma Adams.
- Laura Chenel – cheesemaker who was America's first commercial producer of goat cheese, and helped to popularize goat cheese in America.
- Chèvréchard – French cheese manufacturer specializing in goat cheeses, located in the goat-cheese producing region of Poitou-Charentes. It produces Clochette and Aperichevre cheeses.
- Cooleeney Farmhouse Cheese – produces a number of cheeses from both cow's milk and goat's milk from their premises near Thurles in County Tipperary, Ireland.
- Edward Coon – 20th century US cheesemaker and entrepreneur
- Cowgirl Creamery – producer of artisanal cheeses located in Point Reyes Station, California, it produces several varieties of cheese.
- Cypress Grove Chevre – located in Arcata, California, they specialize in goat cheeses, including Humboldt Fog.

=== D ===
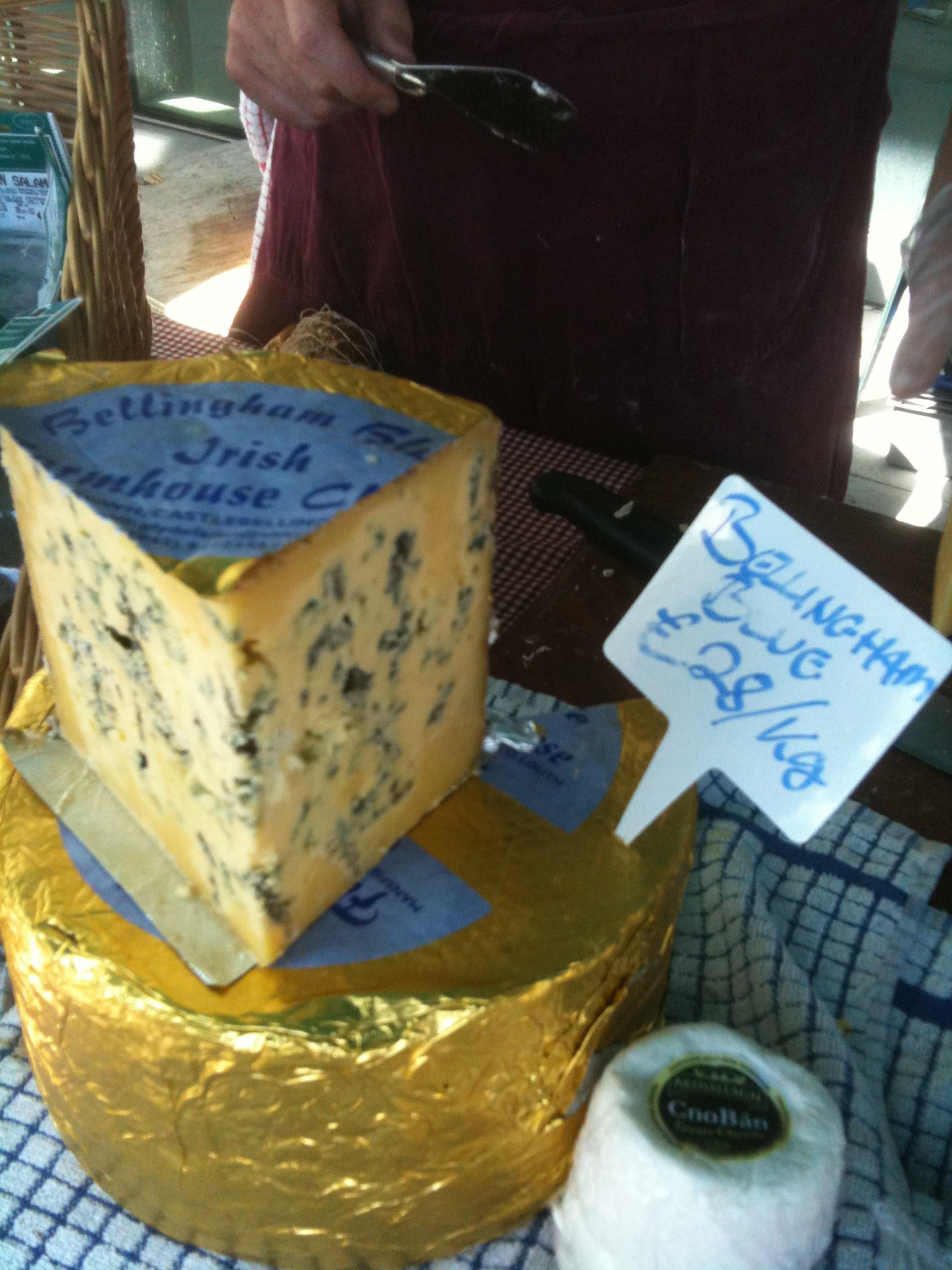
Bellingham Blue, a blue cheese made by Glyde Farm Produce

- Darigold—farmer-owned co-op that produces cheese and other high quality dairy products that are available in the United States and several countries around the world.
- DCI Cheese Company
- Sheana Davis – maker of Delice de la Vallee and other fresh cheeses and owner of the Epicurean Connection.

=== G ===
- Glyde Farm Produce – established in 1996 at a family farm at Mansfieldtown in County Louth, Ireland in 2000., the company produces Bellingham Blue and Boyne Valley Blue cheeses.
- Gossner Foods – based in Logan, Utah, it is one of the largest cheese manufacturers in the United States.
- Groupe Bel – multinational cheese marketer centered in France. The Laughing Cow, Babybel, Kiri, Leerdammer, Boursin are its five core brands, and are distributed on five continents.

=== H ===
- Joseph Harding – responsible for the introduction of modern cheese making techniques and has been described as the "father of Cheddar cheese". He is credited with having invented the "definite formula" for the production of cheddar cheese.

=== J ===
- Jasper Hill Farm – artisan cheesemaker in Greensboro, Vermont.

=== K ===
- Kraft Foods – an American grocery manufacturing and processing conglomerate headquartered in Chicago, Illinois, part of the Kraft Heinz Company.

=== L ===
- Lactalis – multi-national dairy products corporation, owned by the Besnier family and based in Laval, Mayenne, France. It is the largest dairy products group in the world, and is the second largest food products group in France, behind Danone.
- Land O'Lakes – an American producer of butter and cheese products headquartered in Arden Hills, Minnesota.
- Andrew Linton – (November 28, 1893 – January 9, 1971) was a New Zealand cheesemaker, farmer and New Zealand Dairy Board administrator.
- Ulrika Eleonora Lindström – (1835–1892) was a Swedish cheesemaker, the inventor of the Västerbotten cheese.

=== M ===
- Margaret of Mar, 31st Countess of Mar – crossbench member of the House of Lords, a farmer and former specialist goats cheesemaker in Great Witley, Worcestershire.
- Maytag Dairy Farms produces Maytag Blue cheese from homogenized cow's milk instead of the traditional sheep's milk.
- Noella Marcellino – American Benedictine nun with a doctorate in microbiology, she concentrates on the positive effects of decay and putrefaction as well as the odors and flavors of cheese.
- Marin French Cheese Company – founded in 1865, it is a manufacturer of artisan cheese located in rural west Marin County, California, and the oldest cheese manufacturer still in operation in the United States. It produces cheeses under the Rouge et Noir brand name.
- Catherine Mathieson – (December 11, 1818 – September 14, 1883) New Zealand cheese and butter maker and community leader.
- Murray's Cheese – artisan cheese in Manhattan, owned by Kroger

=== N ===
- Mausam Narang, founder of Eleftharia, winner of multiple World Cheese Awards.
- Nature's Harmony Farm – farmstead artisanal cheese operation located in northeast Georgia.
- North Cork Creameries - Irish creamery and agricultural co-op.

=== P ===
- Point Reyes Farmstead Cheese Company – artisanal cheese company located in Point Reyes Station in Marin County, California, with dairy farmland located in the Point Reyes area. Their flagship cheese, the raw milk Point Reyes Original Blue was the only blue cheese produced in California when it was introduced.
- Polly-O – known for ricotta, mozzarella, and string cheeses

=== R ===
- Rogue Creamery – artisanal cheese operation located in Oregon, since 2003, winner of 30 international and over 50 national cheese-making awards.

=== S ===
- Lino Saputo – founder and chairman of the Canadian-based cheese manufacturer Saputo Inc.
- Sargento – American food producer best known for its cheese, it was the first company to sell packaged shredded cheese, and the first to develop zippered packaging for its cheeses.
- Will Studd – Australian cheese specialist, Studd has been working with artisan and farmhouse cheeses for more than three decades
- Sweet Grass Dairy – artisan cheese producer located in Thomasville, Georgia.

=== T ===
- Tillamook County Creamery Association – dairy cooperative headquartered in Tillamook County, Oregon, best known for its cheddar cheese.
- Tingvollost, family farm in Tingvoll Municipality in Norway, makes the Kraftkar (World Champion in World Cheese Awards, 2016).

=== U ===
- Uplands Cheese Company – whose Pleasant Ridge Reserve was chosen by Simon Majumdar as one of the 10 best foods in the U.S.

=== V ===
- Valio – Finnish manufacturer of dairy products including cheese, powdered ingredients, butter, yogurt and milk.
- Valley Shepherd Creamery – artisan cheese making farm in Long Valley, New Jersey, the creamery produces 20 varieties of cheese, including Dutch farmstead, Alpine cheese, a Basque shepherd cheese similar to Idiazábal cheese, farmer cheese, ricotta, and a blue cheese.
- Ignazio Vella – American businessman and cheese maker, his father owned Vella Cheese Company, Inc. in California and the Rogue Creamery in Oregon, which he turned over to his children. He took control of both companies and served as their general manager and chief executive officer. He sold Rogue Creamery in 2002.
- Vermont Creamery (formerly Vermont Butter and Cheese Company) – Websterville, Vermont.
- Von Mühlenen of Switzerland

=== W ===
- Markey Wallace – (1893–1984) notable New Zealand cheesemaker, farmer, community leader and local politician. He was born in Waiho, West Coast, New Zealand, in 1893.
- Washington State University Creamery – in Pullman, Washington produces cheeses including Cougar Gold, a sharp white Cheddar cheese that is packaged in tin cans.
- Warrnambool Cheese and Butter – Australian producer of cheese, butter, cream and dairy ingredients, it is based in Victoria and is the oldest dairy processor in Australia, having been established in 1888.
- Whitestone Cheese - New Zealand South Island, established in 1987
- Winchester Cheese Company – was an artisan cheese producer in the town of Winchester, California, in Riverside County, Southern California. and Gouda cheeses of various ages.
- Wyke Farms – a cheese producer located in Somerset, United Kingdom.

== See also ==
- List of cheeses
- List of food companies
