= Cuisine of California =

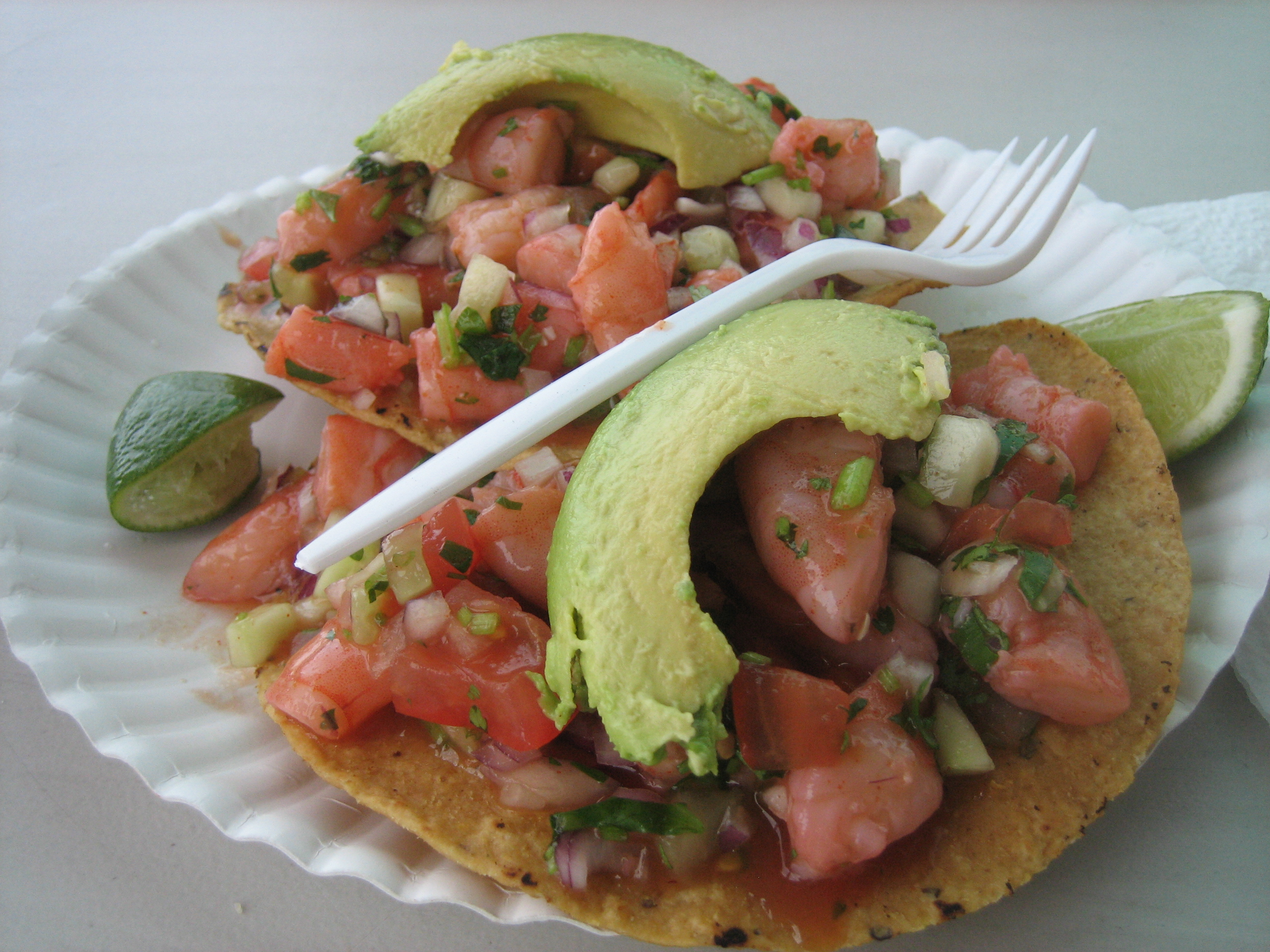
Shrimp tostadas made with locally grown ingredients as served at Tacos Sinaloa in Berkeley, California

The cuisine of California reflects the diverse culture of California and is influenced largely by Indigenous, European American, Hispanic American (Mexican, Latin American, Spanish), East Asian and Oceanian influences (Japanese, Chinese, Korean, Filipino, Vietnamese), and Middle Eastern and Mediterranean influences, as well as the food trends and traditions of larger American cuisine.

The main trends were influenced by a combination of Mediterranean climate, geography and geology of the region's proximity to the ocean, its movie roots in Hollywood, its technology roots in Silicon Valley and the Napa wine country, as well as its major produce production. California used to be part of Mexico, which influenced the state's food.

== History ==
Acorns were commonly eaten by the Indigenous peoples of California.

== Local ingredients ==
Fresh fruits, vegetables, and meats – many of them organic – are commonplace. Their prevalence is driven by the local climate, which is largely a mild Mediterranean climate, and includes a variety of microclimates, as well as health-conscious diets and lifestyles.

In Northern California, with wine country nearby, French, Italian, and Mediterranean inspired food is prominent, as well as Asian-inspired fare. Many of the restaurants, cafes, bistros, and grills use ingredients sourced from local growers and farmers' markets. A unique sourdough-style bread has its origins in San Francisco.

The California coast, especially the North Coast and Central Coast regions, is a source of seafood, which is a staple in the California diet.

California produces almost all of the country's almonds, apricots, dates, figs, kiwi fruit, nectarines, olives, pistachios, prunes, and walnuts. It leads in the production of avocados, grapes, lemons, melons, peaches, plums, and strawberries. This agricultural diversity of California's Central Valley provides fresh produce in the state. With less than 1% of the total farmland in the US, the Central Valley produces 8% of the nation's agricultural output by value.

Sunset, a lifestyle magazine of the West published in California, has featured recipes that have influenced the cuisine of California, including the promotion of outdoor eating.

== Shellfish and seafood ==
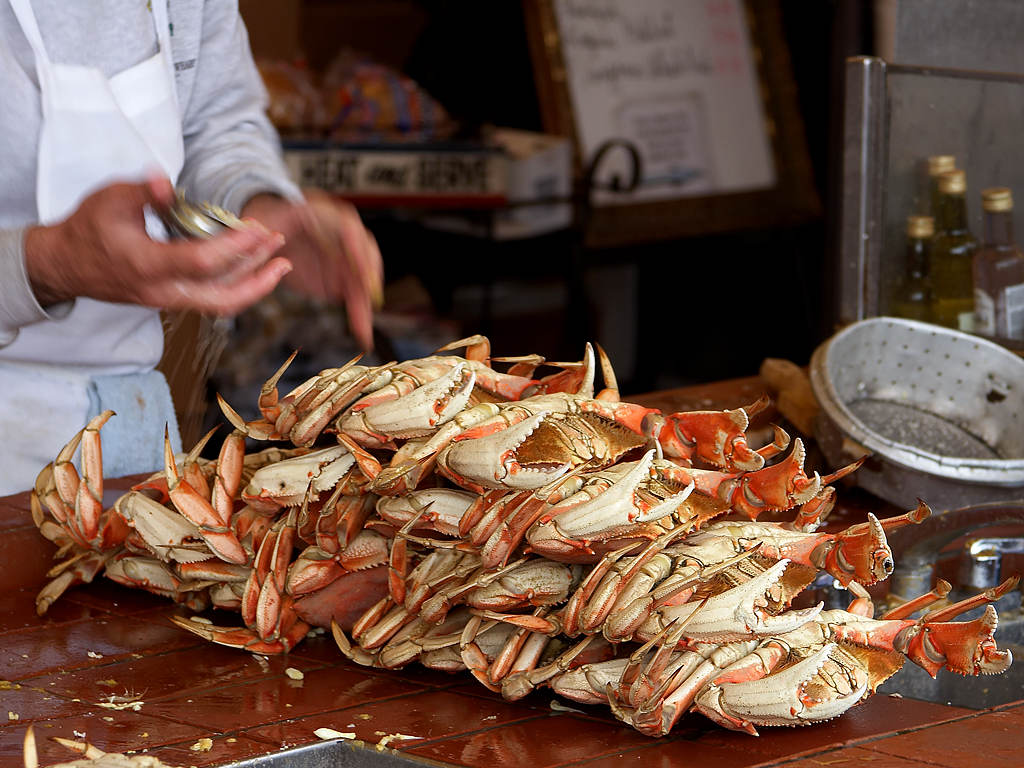
Dungeness crab ready to eat at Fisherman's Wharf in San Francisco

In Northern California and the Central Coastal region, Dungeness crab is abundant. Sardines, oysters, and salmon were formerly major industries in the state, before declines in fish stocks. The Chinook salmon is native to California and are known to spawn in local rivers, however they are considered an endangered species in 2023.

== Asian and Oceanian influences ==
As one of the U.S. states nearest Asia and Oceania, and with long-standing Asian American and Oceanian American populations, the state tends to adopt foods from those national styles. The American style of sushi possibly began in California; the term "California roll" is used to describe sushi with avocado as a primary ingredient.

East Asian confectionery such as mochi ice cream and boba have gained popularity throughout California and the United States, with many establishments that produce them beginning in California.

== Latino and Hispanic influence ==
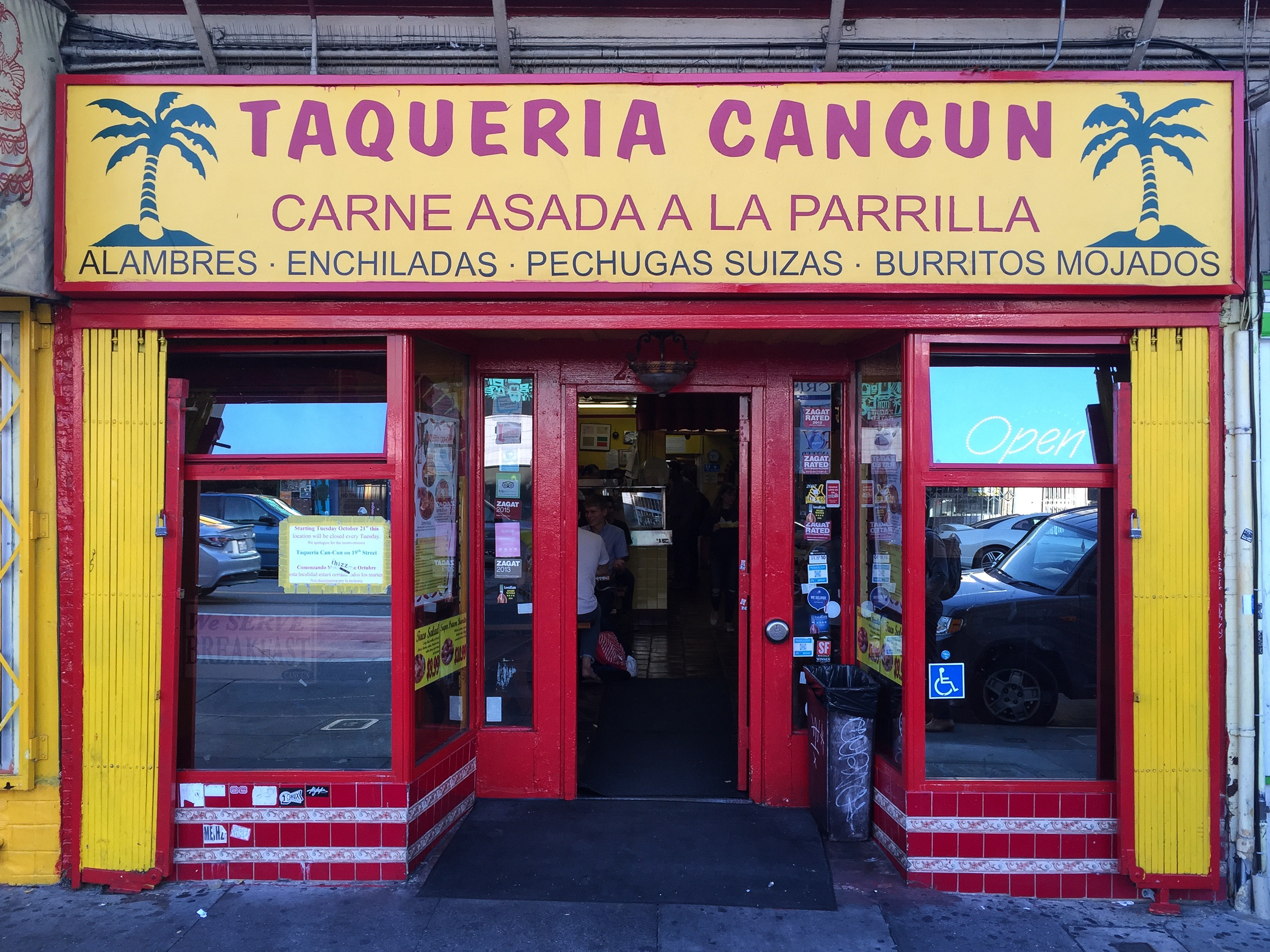
Tacqueria Cancun, Mission District, San Francisco

Because of California's mostly colonial European Spanish roots, Mexican territorial history, and its original population consisting of Meso-Americans, Spanish colonizers and Mexican ranchers, Mexican and Spanish-origin cuisine is very influential and popular in California, particularly Southern California.

Commercial taquería-style Mexican fast food, consisting of offerings such as burritos, refried beans, tortas, tacos, nachos, and quesadillas, is widely popular. Taquerías can be found throughout California.

Traditional Mexican food, while not as common as commercial food, is still widely prepared and abundant in the ethnic Mexican American border communities of San Diego, the Los Angeles metropolitan area, the San Francisco Bay Area, and in Mexican-American enclaves throughout California. Examples of these foods include tamales, tortillas, tostadas, mole, menudo, pozole, sopes, chile relleno and enchiladas.

In addition to Mexican food, California restaurants serve up nearly every variation of Central American food there is. For example, pupuserías are common in areas with a large population of Salvadorans (pupusas are stuffed tortillas from El Salvador).

"Fresh-Mex" or "Baja-style" Mexican food, which places an emphasis on fresh ingredients and sometimes seafood, inspired by Baja California fare, is popular. El Pollo Loco, a fast-food chain that originated in Northern Mexico, is a common sight. Rubio's Fresh Mexican Grill, Baja Fresh, Wahoo's Fish Taco, Chronic Tacos, Chipotle, Qdoba and La Salsa are examples of the Baja-style Mexican-American food trend.

== Fusion cuisine ==
Fusion cuisine is quite popular in California. The emphasis of California cuisine is on the use of fresh, local ingredients which are often acquired daily at farmers markets. Menus are changed to accommodate the availability of ingredients in season. Some restaurants create a new menu daily.

California chef Wolfgang Puck is known as one of the pioneers of fusion cuisine, popularizing such dishes as Chinese chicken salad at the restaurant Ma Maison in Los Angeles. His restaurant Chinois in Santa Monica was named after the term attributed to Richard Wing, who in the 1960s combined French and Chinese cooking at the former Imperial Dynasty restaurant in Hanford, California.

== Barbecue ==
Barbecue has been a part of California cuisine since Mexicans cooked beef in pit barbecues on ranches since the 1840s. Santa Maria, California, is famous for the tri-tip, a special kind of beef cut that can be grilled, baked, braised, or roasted.

California's barbecue style is also influenced by the styles of Arizona, New Mexico, Texas, and Oklahoma, brought by Dust Bowl migrants. Chicken, beef ribs, sausages, and steaks are also grilled or smoked in a barbecue pit.

The barbecue sauce used in this state is tomato-based, as with all other western states. Santa Maria barbecue, however, uses no sauce, relying instead on the flavor of the tri-tip and the slow live-oak fire over which it is cooked.

Pork baby back ribs are popular for barbecue in the Western region in comparison to the popular use of spare ribs in the United States.

== Sandwiches, burgers, and fast food ==
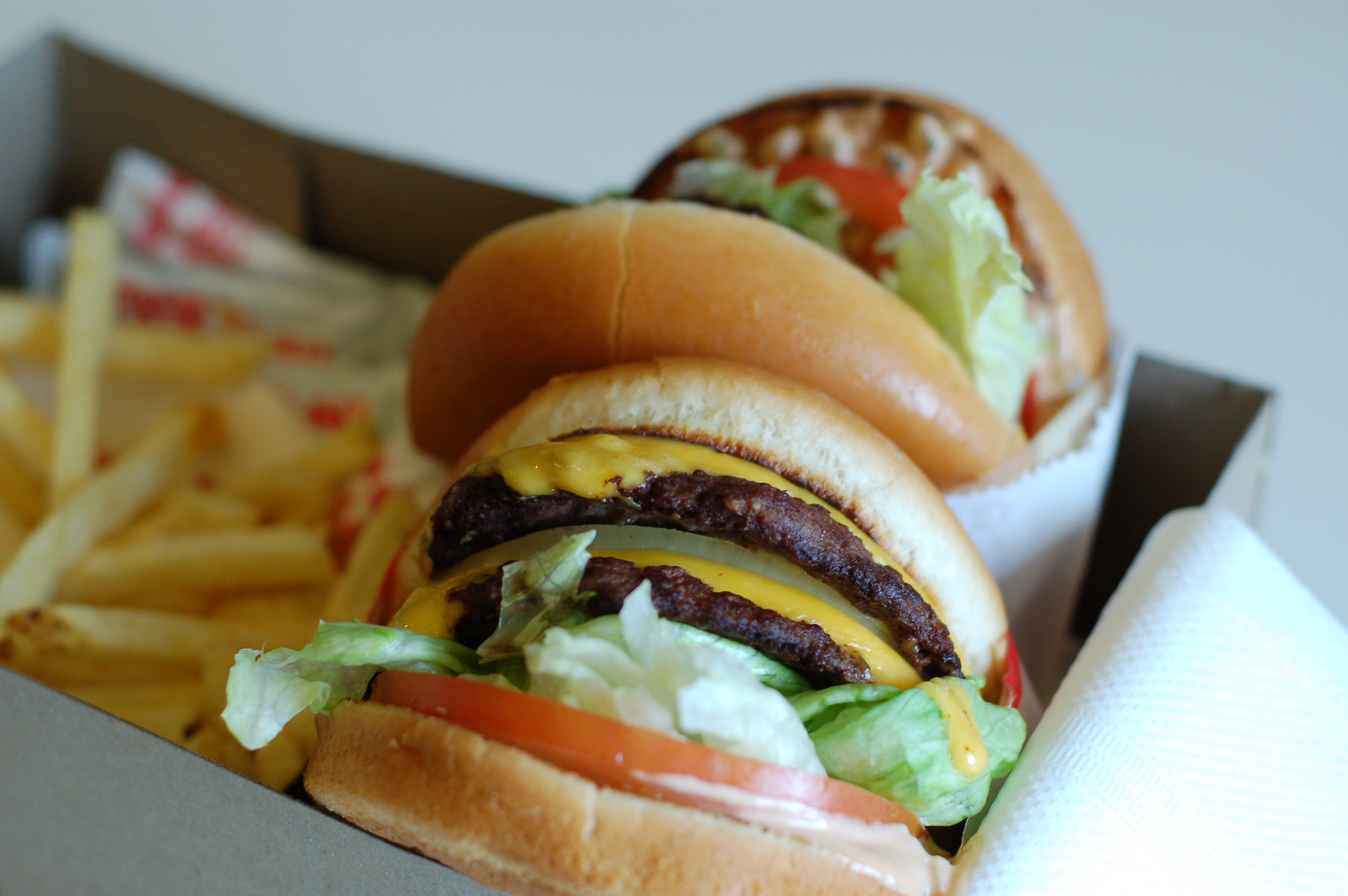
An In-N-Out "Double-Double" cheeseburger with fries in a box for consumption in a car

Southern California's car culture and the population's reliance on automobiles for transportation throughout California's vast cities, has widely contributed to the popularity of the classic drive-in and modern drive-through restaurants. Fast food restaurant chains such as McDonald's, Jack in the Box,Fatburger, In-N-Out Burger, Carl's Jr., Wienerschnitzel, Del Taco, Taco Bell, Panda Express, Original Tommy's, The Habit, and Big Boy were all established in Southern California.

Regional fast-food menus differ, generally depending on the ethnic composition of an area. In Southern California, smaller chains like The Hat feature hamburgers, Mexican food, chili fries, and pastrami.

In Northern California, smaller chains like Gott's Roadside feature Niman Ranch hamburgers with toppings like avocado, ahi burgers, salads, and they have a full wine bar with many local varieties; and the local chain Original Joe's is a steakhouse that serves Italian-American food, which includes their noted dish Joe's Special.

While gastropubs are not unique to California, the concept of the gourmet hamburger is very popular.

== Specific dishes ==
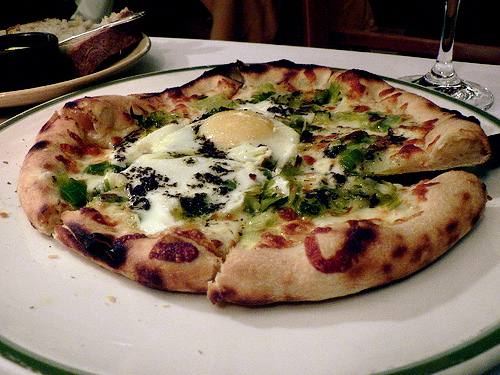
Pizza topped with egg from the Chez Panisse cafe

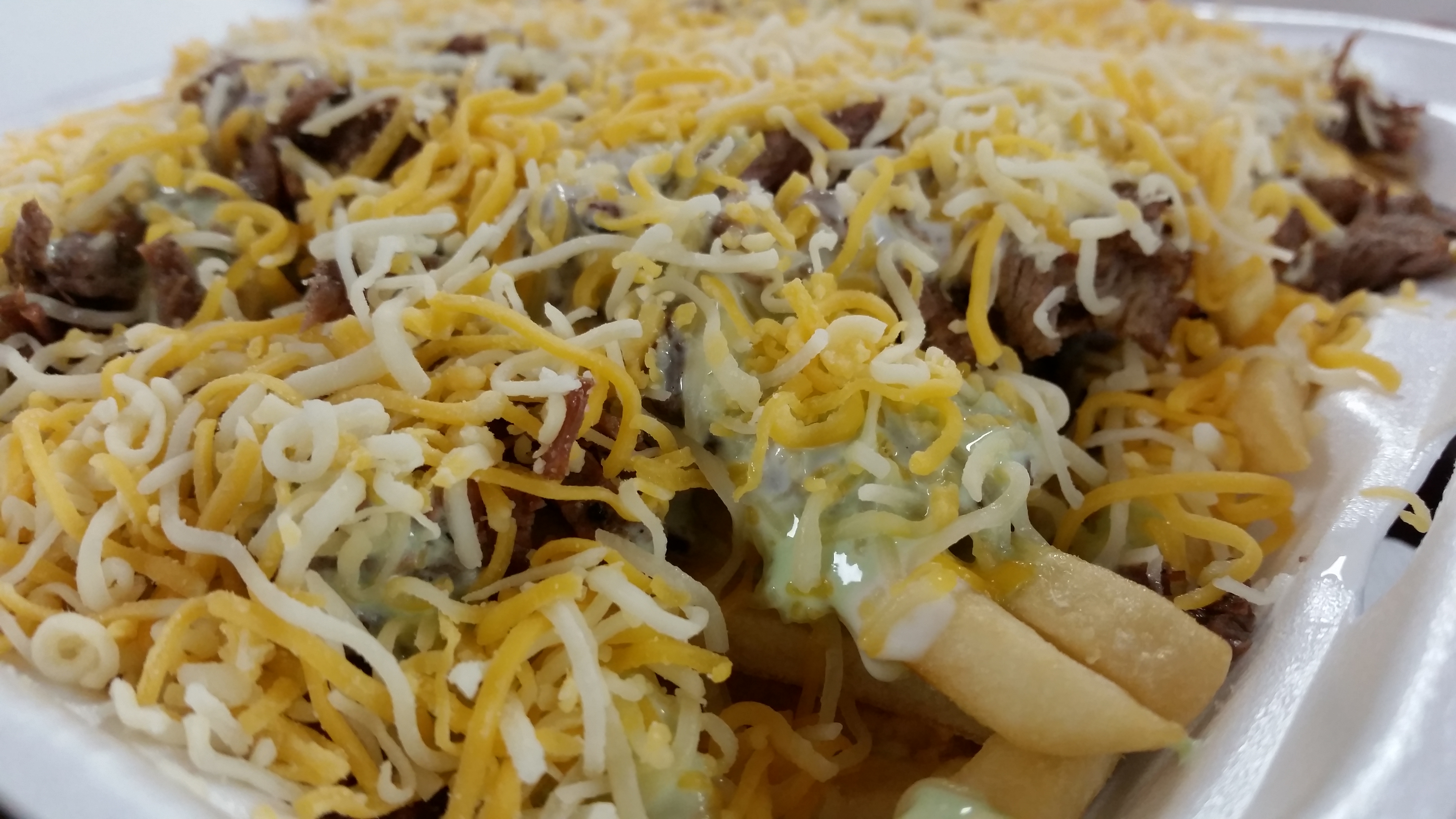
Carne asada fries

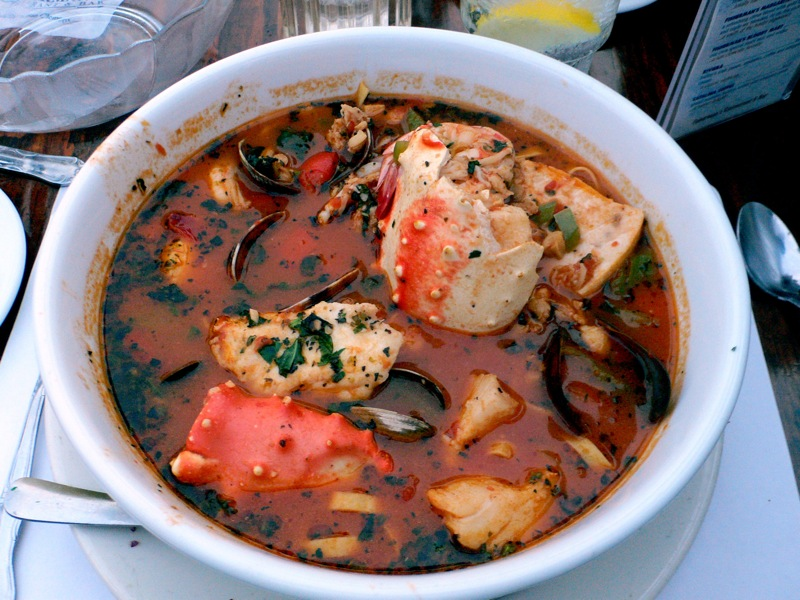
Bowl of Cioppino

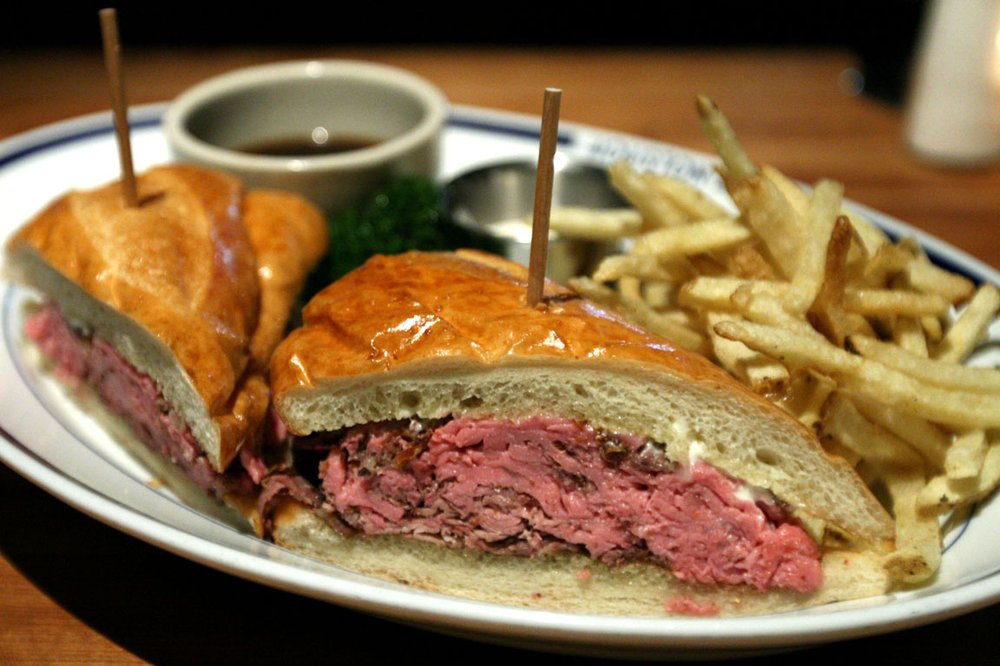
French Dip sandwich with au jus and french fries

=== California-style pizza ===
California-style pizza focuses on non-traditional pizza ingredients, such as fresh produce and barbecued meats. First popularized by Wolfgang Puck's Spago restaurants, it was later brought to the masses by restaurants such as California Pizza Kitchen.

=== Carne asada fries ===
Carne asada fries are a Mexican-American dish originating in the Chicano community in San Diego. The dish typically consists of french fries, carne asada, guacamole, sour cream, and cheese.

=== Cioppino ===
Cioppino is an Italian-American seafood stew invented in San Francisco. It often features crab, shrimp, clams and firm-fleshed fish cooked with herbs in olive oil and wine, with onions, garlic, tomatoes and sometimes other vegetables. It was said to be created by immigrants in San Francisco from Genoa in the late 1800s. It is a type of Buridda and may be related to the Bourride and Bouillabaisse.

=== Crab Louie ===
Crab Louie is a type of salad that prominently features crab meat. The recipe dates back to the early 1900s and originates on the West Coast of the United States. The exact origins of the dish are uncertain, but it is known that Crab Louie was being served in San Francisco as early as 1910 and was popularized in the 1930s in Fisherman's Wharf.

=== Fortune cookie ===
A fortune cookie is a crisp and sugary cookie wafer made from flour, sugar, vanilla, and sesame seed oil with a piece of paper inside, a "fortune". The exact origin of fortune cookies is unclear, though various immigrant groups in California claim to have popularized them in the early 20th century. They most likely originated from cookies made by Japanese immigrants to the United States in the late 19th or early 20th century.

=== French dip ===
A French dip sandwich, or beef dip, is a hot sandwich consisting of thinly sliced roast beef on a "French roll" or baguette that is usually served plain, but a variation is to top with Swiss cheese, onions, and a dipping container of beef broth produced from the cooking process (termed au jus, "with juice").

Two Los Angeles restaurants have claimed to be the birthplace of the French dip sandwich in 1908: Cole's Pacific Electric Buffet and Philippe the Original.

=== Hangtown fry ===
The Hangtown fry is a type of scrambled eggs made of a concoction of eggs, bacon, and oysters. It was a Gold Rush-era invention popularized in Placerville and San Francisco, and it was considered an expensive luxury.

=== Mission burrito ===
A Mission burrito is a type of burrito that first became popular during the 1960s in the Mission District of San Francisco, California. It features a large size, the inclusion of rice, and is often cooked on the flattop.

== Gourmet food products ==
=== Bakeries ===
Gourmet bakeries and makers that had their start in California include:

- Acme Bread Company
- La Tempesta Bakery
- Semifreddi's Bakery
- Takaki Bakery
- Your Black Muslim Bakery

=== Cheese and dairy ===
Gourmet cheese and dairy companies and makers that had their start in California include:

- Cowgirl Creamery
- Clover Sonoma
- Laura Chenel
- Marin French Cheese Company
- Point Reyes Farmstead Cheese Company

=== Chocolate, ice cream, and confections ===
Gourmet chocolatiers and manufacturers that had their start in California include:

- Dandelion Chocolate
- Dreyer's
- Baskin Robbins
- Ghirardelli Chocolate Company
- Guittard Chocolate Company
- It's-It Ice Cream
- Jelly Belly
- Joseph Schmidt Confections
- Scharffen Berger Chocolate Maker
- See's Candies
- TCHO

=== Coffee ===
- Blue Bottle Coffee
- The Coffee Bean & Tea Leaf
- Folgers
- Hills Bros. Coffee
- MJB (coffee)
- Oakland Coffee Works
- Peet's Coffee & Tea
- Philz Coffee
