= The Girl & The Fig =

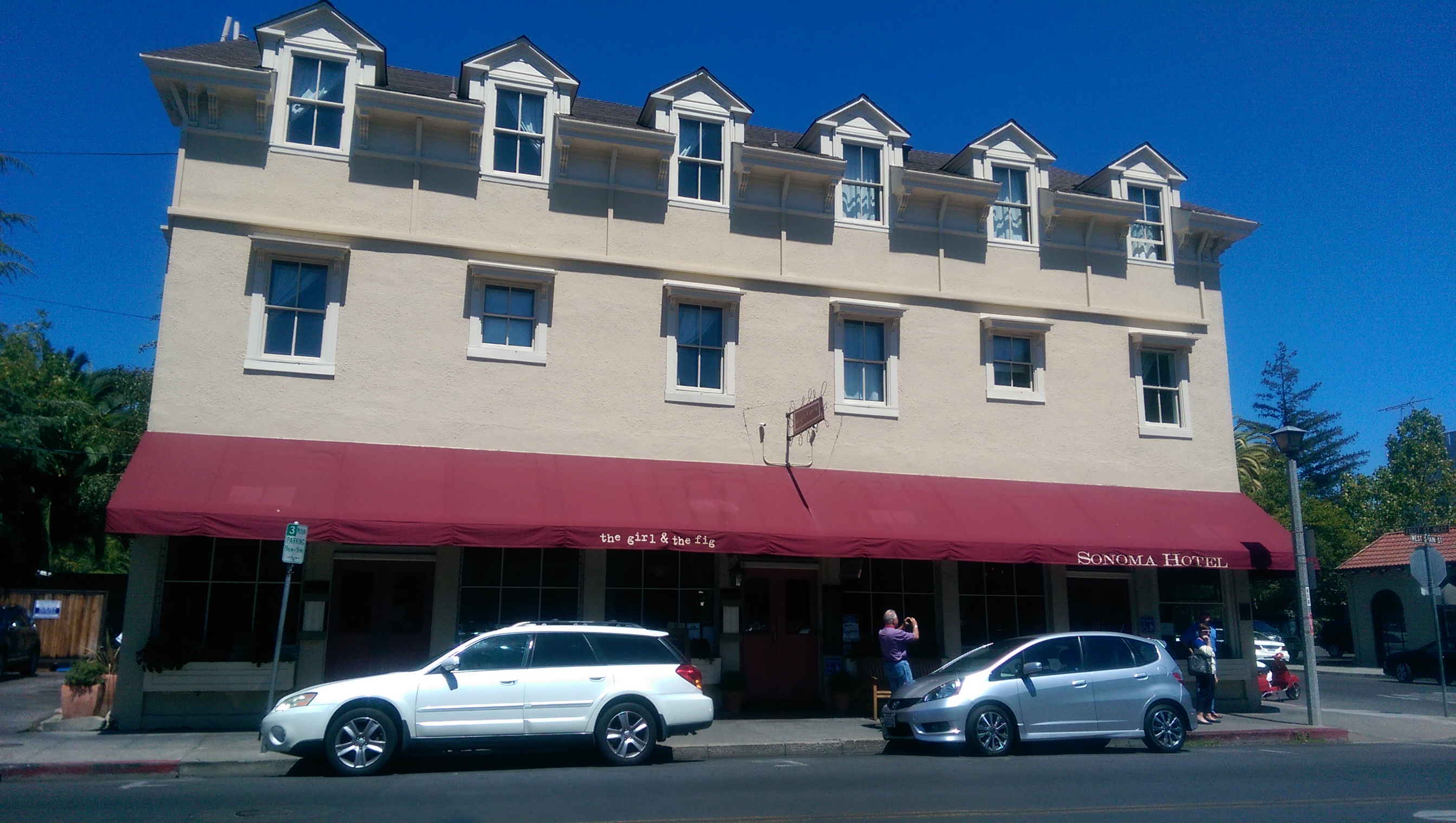
- Interactive map of The Girl & The Fig

Restaurant information
- Established: 1997
- Owner: Sondra Bernstein
- Head chef: John Toulze
- Food type: French cuisine
- Dress code: Casual
- Rating: Yelp; Zagat
- Location: 110 W. Spain Street, Sonoma, California, 95476, United States
- Coordinates: 38°17′38.7″N 122°27′31.81″W
- Seating capacity: 65
- Reservations: Yes
- Website: TheGirlAndTheFig.com

The Girl & The Fig (stylized as the girl & the fig) is a restaurant in Sonoma, California in the United States. It was opened in Glen Ellen, California by Sondra Bernstein in 1997. In 2001, the restaurant relocated to downtown Sonoma.

== History ==
The Girl & The Fig was opened in 1997 by Sondra Bernstein in Glen Ellen, California. John Toulze left working at Viansa Winery to help Bernstein open the restaurant. He worked as a sous chef and a manager. Around 1999 he became executive chef and he remains in that position today. Toulze is also a business partner and director of operations for the restaurant.

In 2001, the restaurant relocated to its current location in downtown Sonoma; the bottom floor of the Sonoma Hotel. bar comprises a waiting area, a small gift shop, and a large antique wooden bar. There is a dining room that extends into an outdoor patio. In 2004, Bernstein published the girl & the fig cookbook. The restaurant also has its own line of food and food-related products called "FIG FOOD" that it sells at the restaurant. In 2006, the restaurant was the focus of a Fortune Small Business makeover.

It is one of the many restaurant and food businesses that Bernstein owns, who is estimated to make approximately $10 million a year, as of 2012, from her businesses. In 2012, the restaurant was visited by Ben Flajnik and his date during season 16 of The Bachelor. That same year, Lady Gaga visited the restaurant.

During the 2020 COVID-19 pandemic, Bernstein laid off the majority of her staff to reduce costs and the farm, where Bernstein grew much of the produce for the restaurant, was sold. The Girl & the Fig offered curbside and take out, with outdoor dining when possible. Bernstein partnered with gourmet slush business, Wicked Slush, to offer special slush cocktails to attract take out business. Bernstein also sold take out ramen noodles and Japanese food from a side door at the restaurant. As of July 2020, the restaurant was bringing in a one third of its pre-pandemic sales.

== Cuisine ==
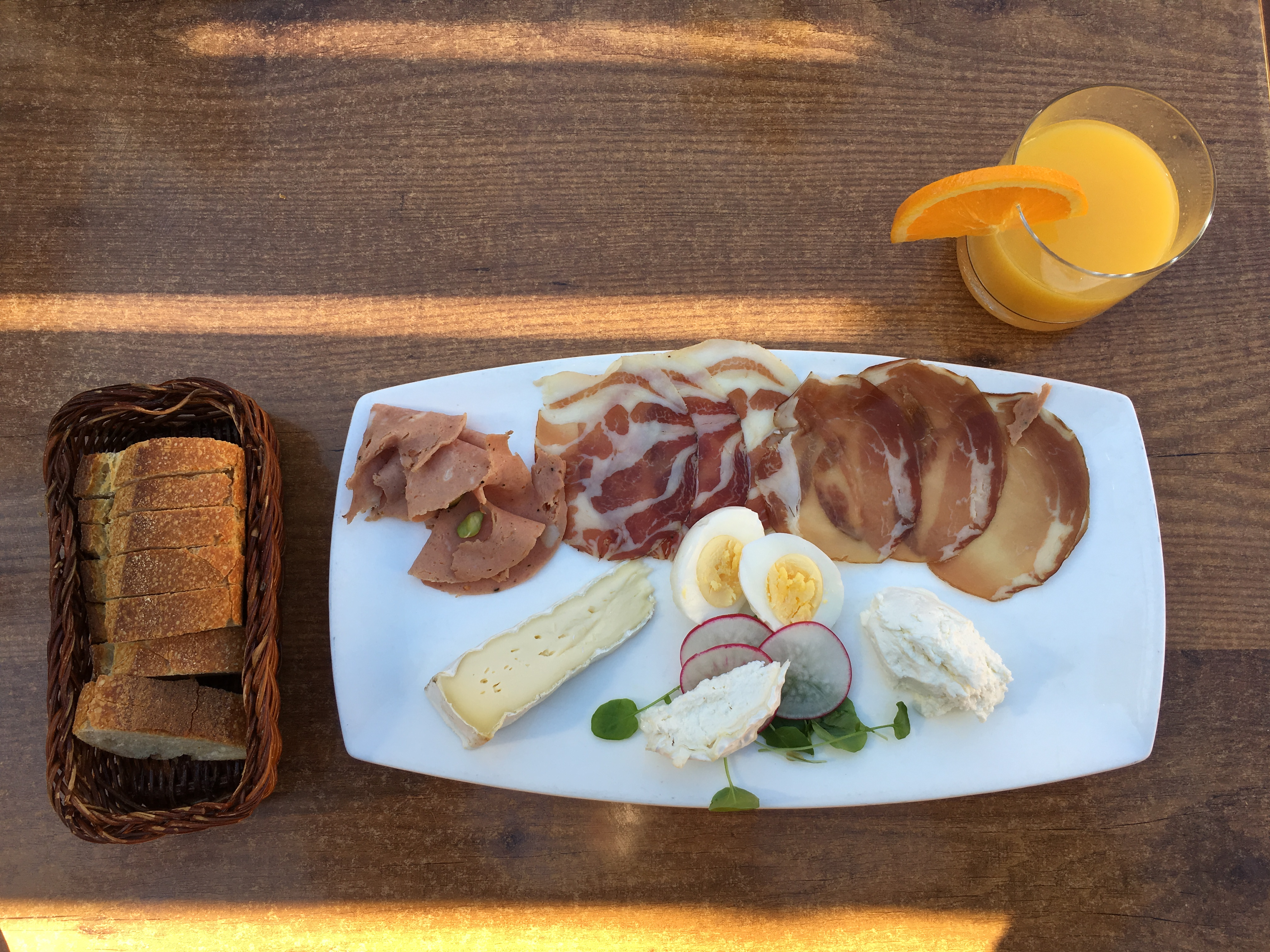
Housemade charcuterie served with local cheese at brunch at The Girl & The Fig

The restaurant serves lunch, dinner and brunch on Sunday. Travel and Leisure has called the restaurants food French cuisine and also American food. Michelin Guide has called it Californian cuisine. Many of the vegetables and fruits served in the restaurant are from the restaurant's own garden located in Sonoma, which is organic and biodynamic. 95% of fresh food served is locally grown. Brunch dishes include french toast stuffed with blue cheese and poached egg with duck confit. Lunch and dinner entrees include beef carbonade, black cod, trout and beet salads, hamburgers, and flounder with meunière sauce. Its signature dish is a fig and arugula salad. The restaurant also sells artisan cheese plates, including cheese by Laura Chenel. Desserts include a creme brulee made with lavender. The restaurant makes its own charcuterie.

Cocktails on the menu are French inspired with fresh ingredients, including figs. The wine list is exclusively Rhône wine made in California. One of the house cocktails is the Fig Royale which consists of sparkling wine and syrup made of fig. An additional cocktail on the menu is a Lavender mojito.

== Reception ==
The Girl & The Fig was named one of the top ten best restaurants in the United States for Thanksgiving meals in 2009 by Bon Appétit. The restaurant has been reviewed and visited on multiple occasions by The New York Times. The restaurant has been favorably reviewed Bon Appétit, Wine Enthusiast, Wine Spectator, and Country Living.

== Gallery ==
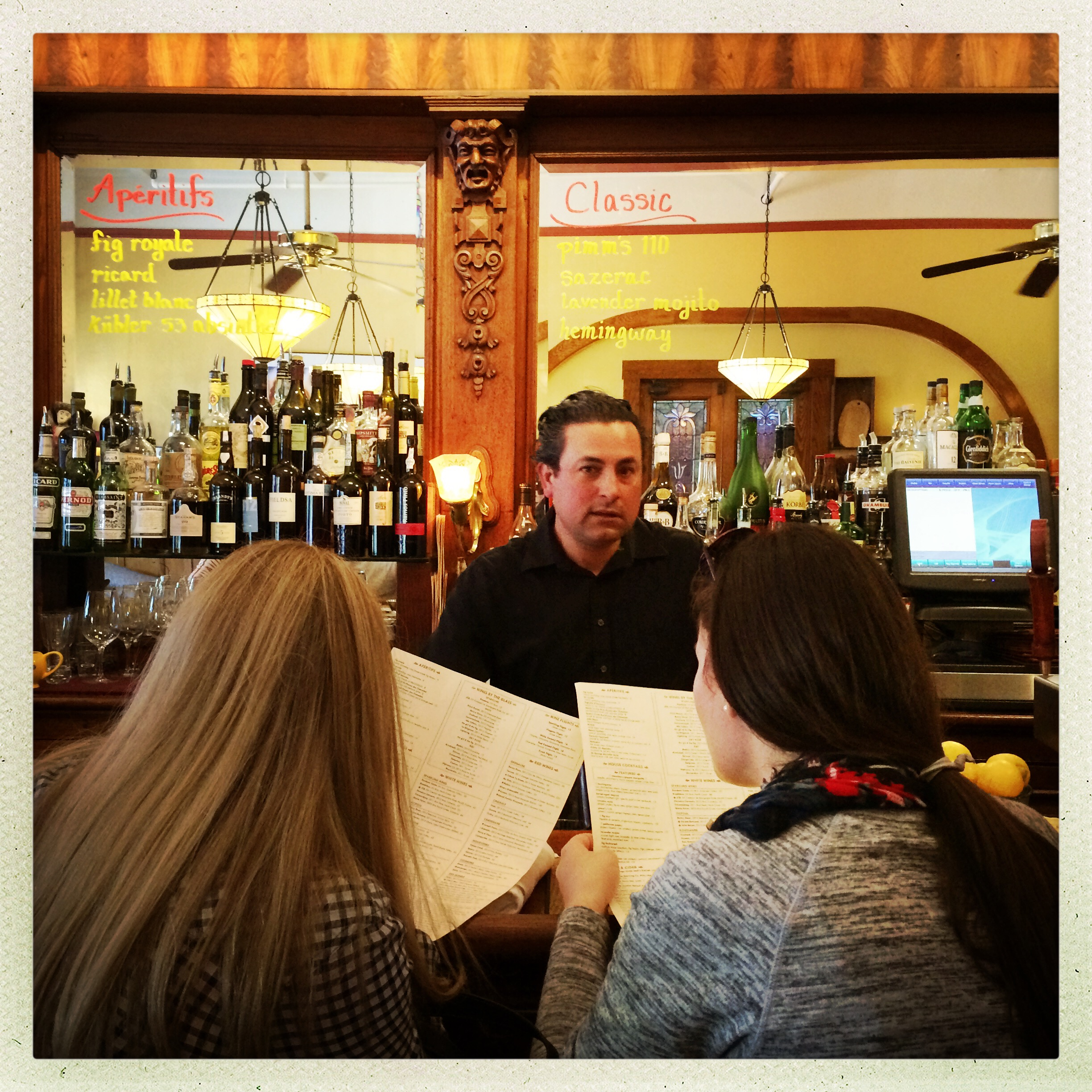
Jack, a bartender, with patrons at the bar

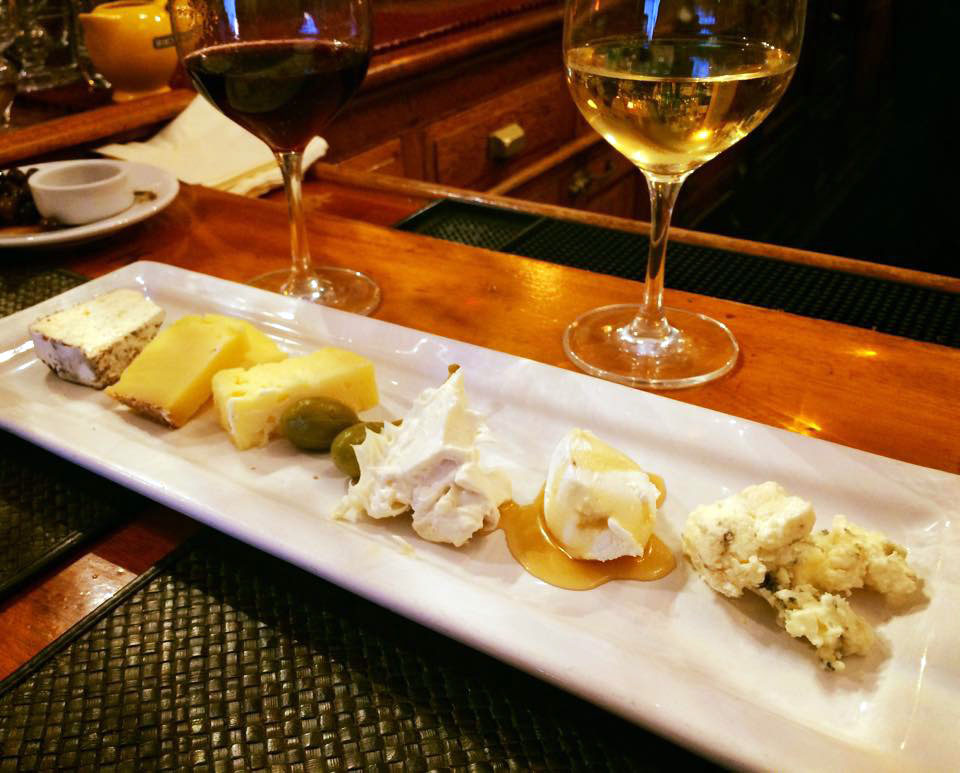
Cheese plate at the bar

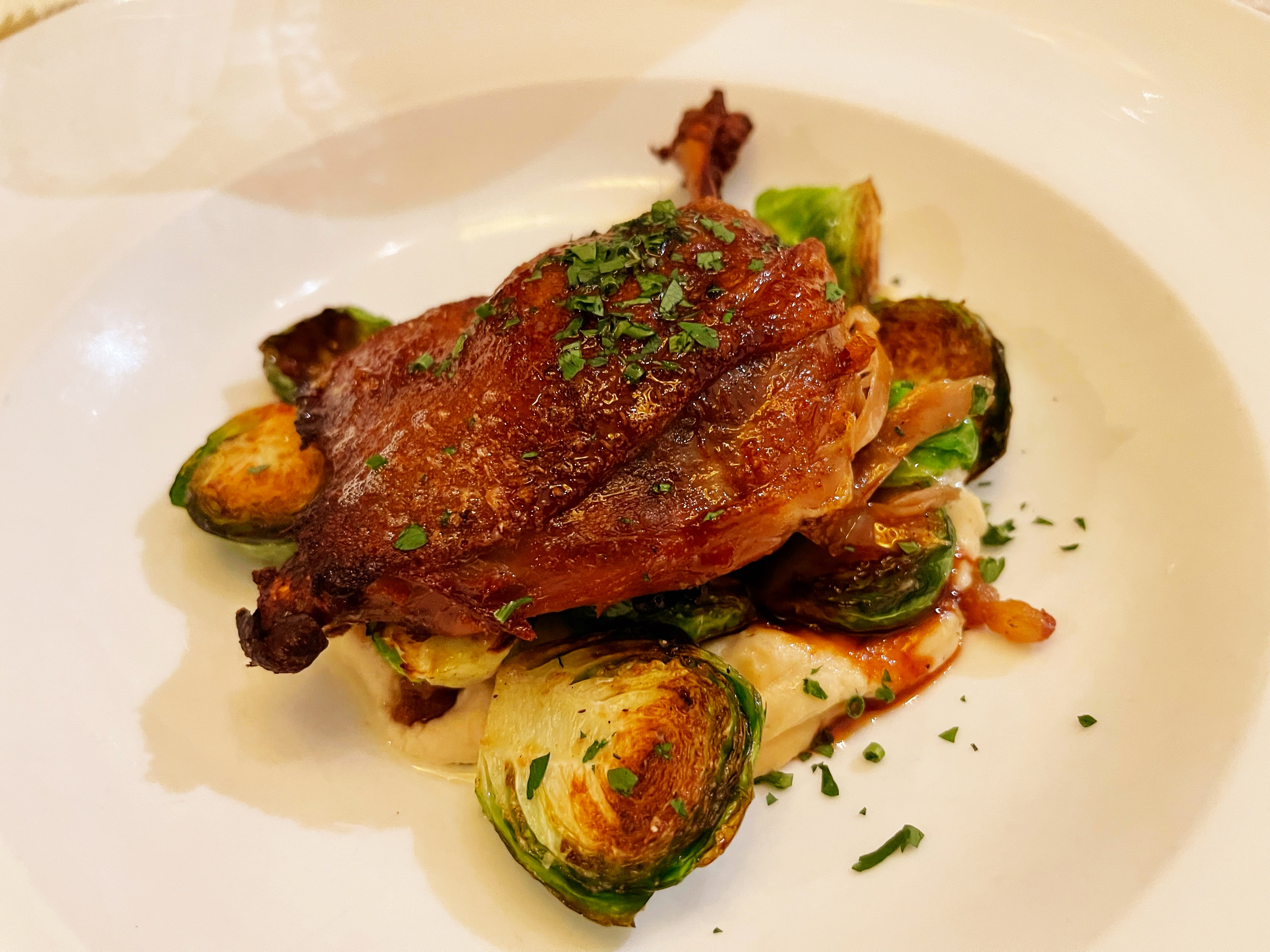
Duck confit, one of the signature dishes at the girl & the fig
