= Marin French Cheese Company =

American cheese manufacturer

Coordinates: 38.1374°N 122.7096°W

- Type: Private
- Founded: 1865
- Founder: Jefferson A. Thompson
- Headquarters: 7500 Red Hill Road Petaluma, CA 94952, United States
- Area served: California
- Products: Artisan cheese
- Owner: Rians
- Website: marinfrenchcheese.com

The Marin French Cheese Company is a manufacturer of artisan cheese located in rural west Marin County, California. The company was founded in 1865 by Jefferson Thompson, and produces cheeses under the Marin French Cheese brand name. It is the oldest continually operating cheese manufacturer in the United States.

== History ==
Early antecedents of the company may go back as far as 1854, although historical records from that era are sketchy. Other accounts state that a local woman named Clara Steele roped wild Spanish cattle in the area to make cheese starting in 1857.

It is known that Jefferson Thompson established the current company in 1865, and his descendants continued the business for 133 years. The company used the Rouge et Noir brand name from 1906 until 2013, when the "Marin French Cheese" brand was created.

Howard Bunce, former operations manager for the company, described their original product, "In the early years we made a granular cheese, it was a 'bar cheese' that was served to San Francisco dock workers – it was shipped by paddle wheeler down the Petaluma River to San Francisco."

In the 1930s, the dairy herd was decimated by disease, and was replaced by Jersey cows from Oregon.

In 1998, Bob Thompson sold the business to the Boyce family of Bishop, California, operators of organic cattle ranches in eastern California and Nevada. Jim Boyce said that the company has a "symbiotic relationship" with the local dairy farmers who supply much of its milk. Mr. Boyce died in 2010 and, in 2011, Marin French was purchased by Rians fr, the respected French family of cheese producers that also owns Laura Chenel's Chèvre in neighboring Sonoma County.

== Products ==
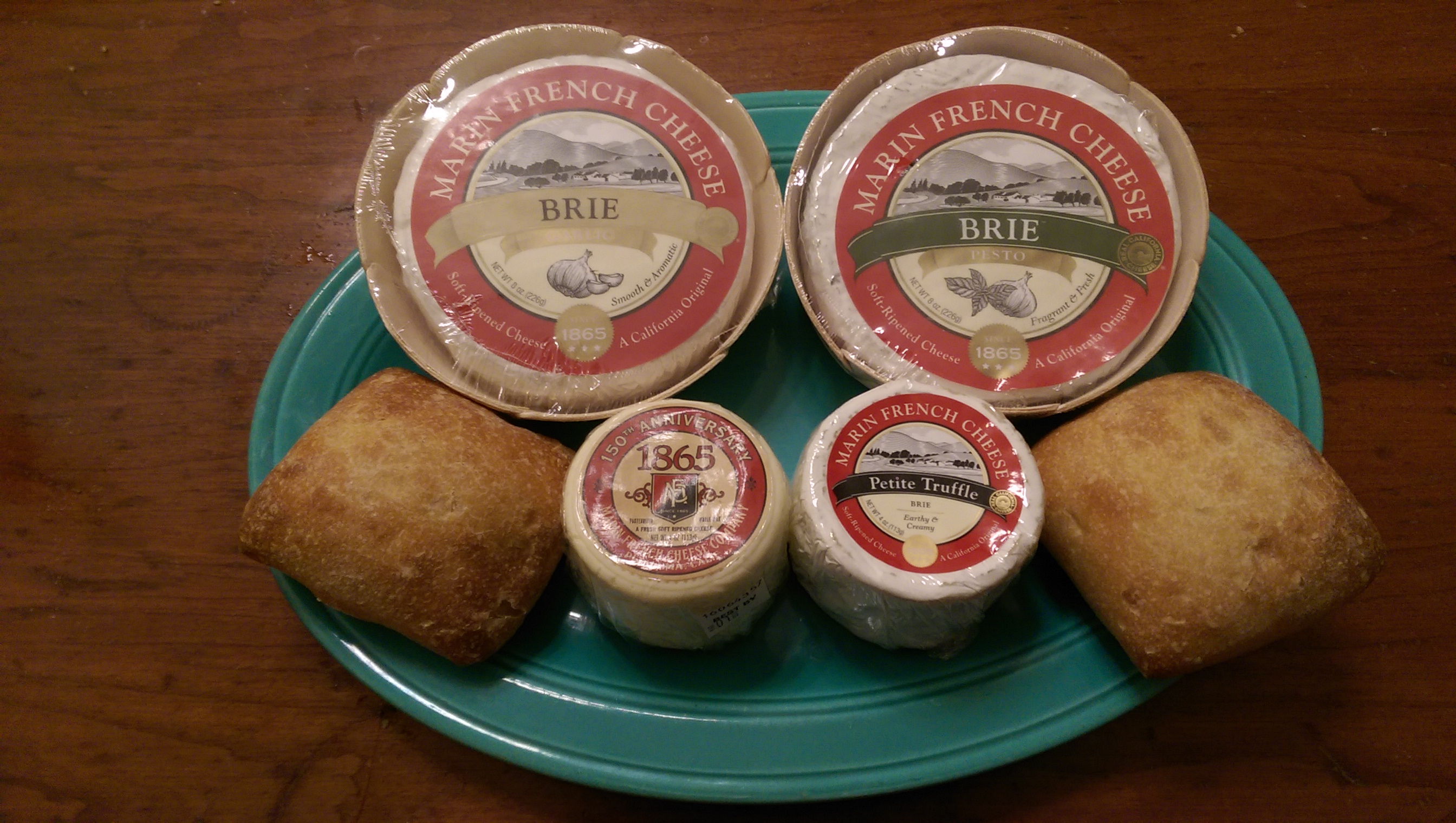
An assortment of Marin French Cheese Company products

The company's original product in 1865 was a breakfast cheese, which was transported by horse-drawn carriage to Petaluma, and then carried by steamboat to San Francisco, where it was sold to waterfront dockworkers. They still manufacture this breakfast cheese. Other products include brie, camembert, chèvre, bleu and washed-rind triple creme Schloss. In 2015 Petite Breakfast wears the commemorative vintage label, “1865” to celebrate their 150th year and honor their cheesemakers who sustained the craft over decades.

== Facilities ==
The Marin French Cheese Company is located on a 425-acre (1.72 km^{2}) dairy ranch in the Hicks Valley, and includes a 9,000-square-foot (840 m^{2}) cheese processing and retail sales facility, as well as a variety of barns, storage buildings and a picnic area. Although the company has a Petaluma address, it is located 11 miles (18 km) southwest west of that city. It is 11 miles (18 km) northwest of Novato. The company also conducts art exhibits at its location.

== Agricultural heritage ==
The company collaborates with other local cheesemakers in Marin and Sonoma counties to support the annual California Artisan Cheese Festival, held in Petaluma. Former company's owner, Jim Boyce, describes their philosophy, "We remain dedicated to a rich heritage of artisan craftsmanship that has been passed down through the generations. Marin French Cheese Company now produces more than 40 different styles and varieties of cheese, yet each is handmade the same patient way, one cheese at a time, aged in the original hand dug cellar, and then hand weighed and packaged."

== Awards ==
In 2005, the company's Triple Creme Brie won top honors in the pasteurized milk brie category at the World Cheese Awards in London. This was the only gold medal awarded in the class that year.

== See also ==
- List of cheesemakers
