= Winchester Cheese Company =

Winchester Cheese Company was an artisan cheese producer in the town of Winchester, California in Riverside County, Southern California.

The company was started by Jules Wesselink, who was born in the Netherlands and came to the United States when he was in his 20s. He worked at his future in-laws' dairy before moving to Artesia in the 1950s to start his own dairy. He later moved to "a mountain rimmed valley situated in Winchester, near Temecula, about two hours southeast of Los Angeles and not far from San Diego." After a plunge in dairy prices he visited his home town of Haarlem in the Netherlands in 1995, to learn the craft of Gouda cheesemaking. Upon his return he started producing Gouda boerenkaas ("farmer's cheese"), first from milk supplied by his own Holstein cows, a Dutch breed, and after 2001 from other suppliers. Commercial production started in 1996 and by 2008 was up to about 100,000 pounds annually.

Winchester Cheese Company expanded over the years and eventually included a gift shop, tasting area and tour center. "Winchester cheeses have won numerous awards in competitions around the world, and they're now available at cheese speciality shops, upscale restaurants and wineries throughout the Southland", according to a write-up in Westways magazine as well as area farmer's markets. Flavors included a jalapeño Gouda and cumin Gouda, and Gouda cheeses of various ages. Jules Wesselink died in 2011; continuation of production remained uncertain.

As of August 2013, the phone number is not in service and the company website no longer exists. According to Yelp, the company has closed.

== See also ==
- Artisan cheese
- List of cheesemakers
