= Valley Shepherd Creamery =

Valley Shepherd Creamery is an artisan cheese making farm in Long Valley, New Jersey, and the winner of Edible Communities' New Jersey Food Artisan award in 2009.

== History ==
The business was started in 2005 by Eran Wajswol with 120 acres (0.49 km^{2}) in Long Valley, New Jersey. 20 varieties are made, including Dutch farmstead, Alpine cheese, a Basque shepherd cheese similar to Idiazábal cheese, farmer cheese, ricotta, and a blue cheese. The milk comes from sheep raised on the farm and some cheeses are made with a mix of sheep's milk and local cow's milk. An on site shop sells the cheeses, and there are tours of the spring lamb births, as well as the milking and cheese making areas.

== See also ==
- List of cheesemakers
