= Belle Chevre =

Belle Chevre is an artisanal goat cheese maker in Alabama. It was established in 1986 in Elkmont, Alabama, and is now located in Arab near Huntsville, Alabama.

== Company history ==
Belle Chevre was founded by Leone Jones Asbury, who later partnered with, then sold her share of the endeavor to, Liz Parnell who then sold to Tasia Malakasis in 2007. In April 2013 Belle Chevre opened their first cheese shop & tasting room in downtown Elkmont, AL offering free tastings of all of their products to any one who walks in the door. Tasia expanded the product line and focused on branding. The company has been owned by current owner Foster McDonald since 2021 who has been joined in 2022 by cheese expert Pierre Guérin as his partner and president.

== Product line ==
Belle Chevre's product line includes classic goat cheese and goat cheese spreads in three flavors (original, honey, and fig).They also offer a fresh chèvre log that is hand-wrapped in brined grape leaves called "the greek kiss". Since 2022, Belle Chevre Inc. also became the owner, producer and marketer of another specialty brand of Goat Cheese: Chevoo, a range of marinated Goat cheese cubes in Extra Virgin Olive Oil available in multiple flavors.

== Recognition and awards ==
Belle Chevre has produced many different cheese types that have been honored by the American Cheese Society. The cheese was selected by a James Beard Award winning chef as a runner up for Garden & Gun magazine's 2011 Made in the South award. They were voted a Taste Test Award Winner by Cooking Light magazine in 2010, which declares the cheese "has earned the kind of cult status that puts small artisans on the map." Steven Jenkins, one of the world's foremost authorities on cheeses of the world, said "Alabama's FBC cheeses and fromage blanc taste as fine as the best of the Loire Valley, Perigord and Provence, and that's a mouthful".

== See also ==
- List of cheesemakers
