= Jasper Hill Farm =

American artisan cheesemaker

Coordinates: 44°35′12″N 72°16′10″W

Bayley Hazen blue cheese, Jasper Hill, Vermont

Jasper Hill Farm is an artisan cheesemaker in Greensboro, Vermont, owned and operated by Andy and Mateo Kehler. Jasper Hill Farm is also the location of the Cellars at Jasper Hill, which provides aging, sales & marketing services.

== History and products ==
Brothers Andy & Mateo Kehler purchased a piece of land in 1999 known locally in Greensboro as “the Jasper Hill farm,” so-called after a previous owner named Jasper Hill. The Kehlers began selling cheese under the Jasper Hill Farm brand in 2003.

In 2003, Jasper Hill was approached by Cabot Creamery to collaborate on aging a natural-rind clothbound cheddar, which became known as Cabot Clothbound Cheddar. In 2006 this cheese won Best of Show at the American Cheese Society conference.

Inspired by the success of Cabot Clothbound, the Kehlers went on to build the Cellars at Jasper Hill, a 22,000 square foot cheese aging facility built into the hillside of Jasper Hill Farm. The Cellars became operational in 2008, and now ages cheese made by Jasper Hill Farm, as well as products made by 4 other creameries local to northern Vermont and New Hampshire. The Cellars provides sales, marketing & distribution services for the products in its collection, with the goal of reducing the barriers to entry for small-scale cheesemakers. Cheeses aged at the Cellars are distributed nationally within the US; select products are exported for sale in Europe, Canada and Australia.

Jasper Hill Farm is a member of the Specialist Cheesemakers Association, the American Cheese Society, and the Vermont Cheese Council.

Starting in 2013, Jasper Hill began teaching beginning and intermediate cheesemaking courses in conjunction with Sterling College of Craftsbury, Vermont.

In 2013, Winnimere won Best of Show at the annual American Cheese Society conference.

In February 2014, Bayley Hazen Blue was served at the White House state dinner for visiting French President François Hollande.

At the 2014 World Cheese Awards, Bayley Hazen Blue won Super Gold and placed in the Top 16 out of over 2,600 entries from 33 countries, and was named “World’s Best Unpasteurized Cheese”.

== Notable Awards ==
Alpha Tolman

- 2025 Best of Class, American Cheese Society
- 2012 Super Gold, World Cheese Awards

Bayley Hazen Blue

- 2025 Best of Class (top 10 finisher), American Cheese Society
- 2014 Super Gold, World Cheese Awards. Also "World's Best Unpasteurized Cheese"
- 2014 Best of Class, World Championship Cheese Contest

Cabot Clothbound Cheddar

- 2015 Best in Class, American Cheese Society
- 2014 Gold Medal, World Cheese Awards
- 2013 Best of Class, American Cheese Society
- 2011 Award Winner, Good Food Awards
- 2006 Best of Show, American Cheese Society

Harbison

- 2018 Best of Show, American Cheese Society
- 2015 Best American Cheese and Super Gold (Top 16), World Cheese Awards
- 2015 2nd Runner Up for Best of Show, American Cheese Society
- 2015 Best of Class, World Championship Cheese Contest
- 2014 Best of Class, American Cheese Society
- 2014 Best of Class, World Championship Cheese Contest
- 2013 Gold Medal, World Cheese Awards
- 2012 Super Gold, World Cheese Awards
- 2012 Best of Class, World Championship Cheese Contest

Weybridge

- 2012 Award Winner, Good Food Awards

Whitney

- 2022 Best of Show, American Cheese Society

Willoughby

- 2013 Best of Class, American Cheese Society

Winnimere

- 2015 Best in Class, American Cheese Society
- 2015 Gold Medal, World Cheese Awards
- 2013 Best of Show, American Cheese Society
- 2013 Gold Medal, World Cheese Awards
- 2012 Gold Medal, World Cheese Awards
- 2011 Best of Class, World Championship Cheese Contest

Withersbrook Blue

- 2025 Runner Up Best of Show & Best of Class, American Cheese Society

== See also ==
- List of cheesemakers
- Penicillium solitum
