= Will Studd =

Australian cheese specialist

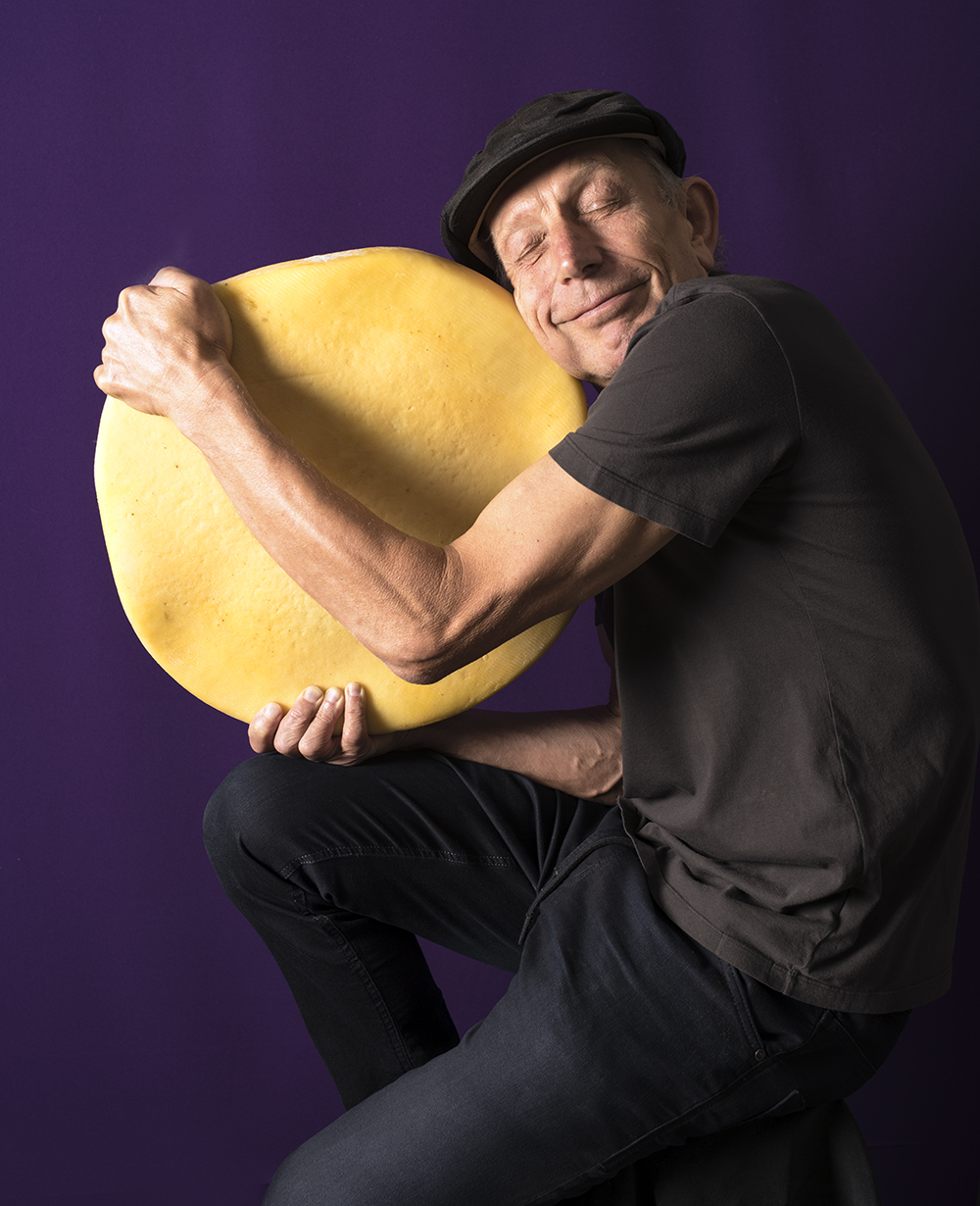
- Will Studd in 2018
- Born: London, England
- Occupations: Cheese specialist, author, television presenter
- Years active: 1970s–present
- Children: 2

Will Studd is an international cheese specialist. Studd has been working with artisan and farmhouse cheeses for more than four decades and has traveled extensively in his vocation. During that time, he has done much to promote a greater understanding of what good cheese is all about, and championed the cause of traditional cheeses made from raw milk. After establishing a chain of delicatessens in central London during the 1970s, he migrated to Melbourne, Australia, in 1982, where he has done much to promote a greater understanding of specialist cheese as well as championing the cause of traditional cheese made from raw milk. His work has included being a distributor, retailer, media commentator, and author of a prize-winning book.

== The Roquefort case ==
In January 2002, Studd challenged minor changes to Australian food regulations relating to raw milk cheese by importing 80 kilograms of Roquefort as a test case.

After the Imported Food Inspection Program (IFIP) refused to test the cheese for compliance, Studd appealed to the Administrative Appeals Tribunal. It took 21 months before the court reached a decision, but during the delay Food Standards Australia New Zealand (FSANZ) changed the dairy regulations to allow the production and sale of hard-cooked cheeses made from raw milk. (Amendment P 296)

The court upheld the ban on Roquefort and it was subsequently buried in a public tip. Two years later FSANZ also granted a special exemption for the sale of Roquefort in Australia (Amendment A 499) after an 11-year ban.

Studd lodged applications with FSANZ for similar exemptions for the production and sale of all European raw milk cheese in 2004 (A530/5310). After a delay of five years, FSANZ finally announced a review of the domestic regulations on the production and sale of raw milk cheese in Australia in 2009 (P1007)

In 2008, the New Zealand Food Safety Authority (NZFSA) allowed the sale of Roquefort on the basis of the Australian report (A499). The following year they announced proposals to change the regulations on the production and sale of raw milk cheese in New Zealand, and proposals to recognise European regulations for some cheese types.

== International awards ==
Hall of Fame Le Cordon Bleu World Food Media Awards
2009 – Officier of the Ordre National du Mérite Agricole by the French Ministry of Agriculture
2017- Delicious Produce Awards Outstanding Innovation Award

== Books ==
Studd has published two books, Chalk and Cheese (1999) and Cheese Slices (2007), both of which have been recognized by cheese specialists around the world as valuable guides to understanding cheese. ‘Chalk and Cheese’ won Best Book on Cheese at the 2009 World Cookbook Fair Awards, Best in the World in France. In 2015 he also collaborated with Bob Hart and Dean Cambray in Melt! ] another cheese-related book.

== 'Will Studd Selected' Cheese Range ==
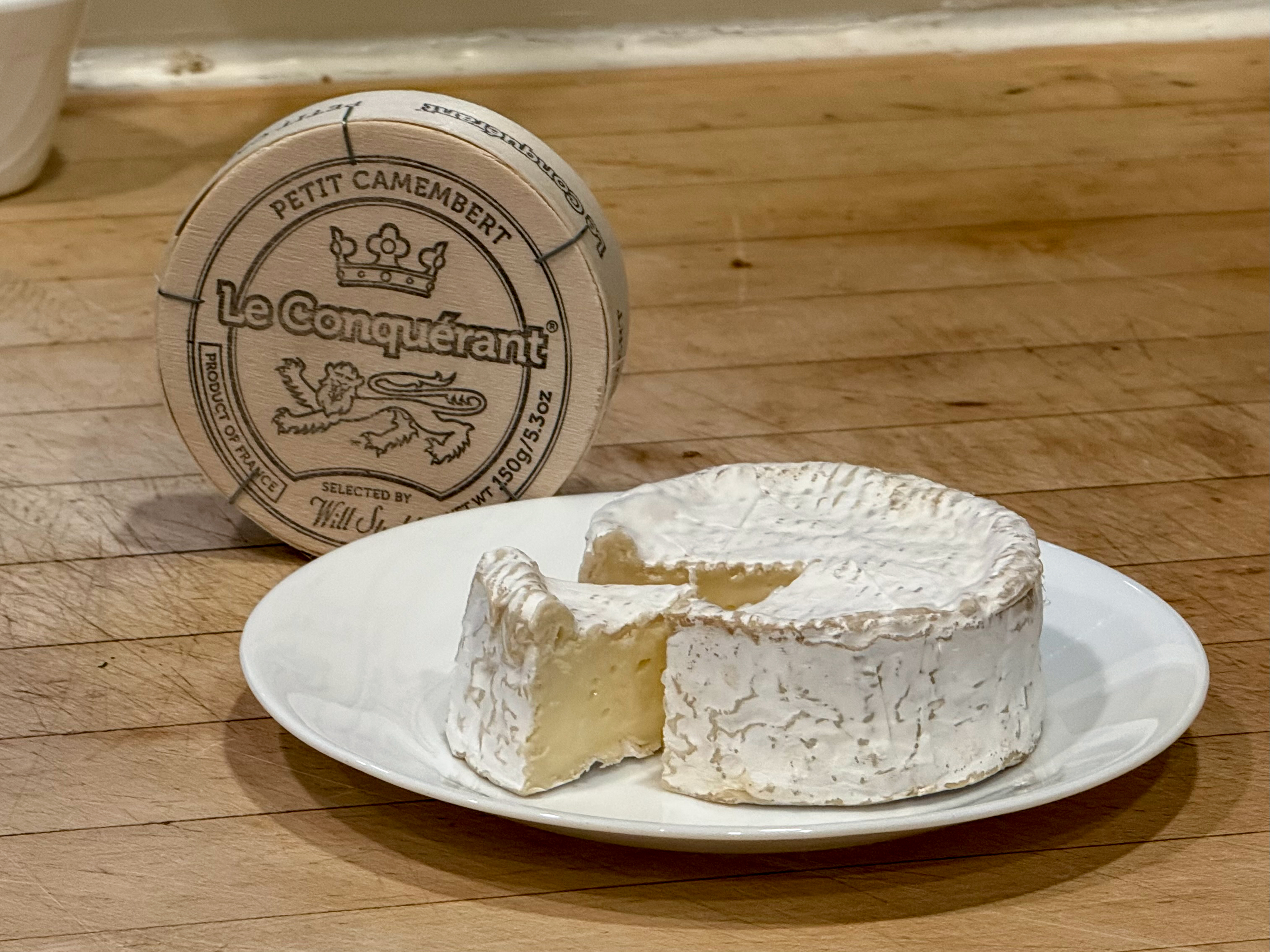
Le Conquérant Camembert

In recent years, he has created a 'Selected by Will Studd' range of benchmark cheeses, each one carefully chosen for its provenance, texture, aroma and flavour. These are available in Australia and the USA.

== Television series ==
Since 2002, Studd has been an executive producer and presenter of 'Cheese Slices', the world's only television series focused on international artisan and traditional handmade cheeses filmed in two dozen countries. 'Cheese Slices' was conceived by Will Studd and Producer/Director/Editor Michael Ross Robinson of Squid Ink Media.

This International TV series explores the fascinating history, skills and traditions behind some of the world's most significant traditional cheeses. The 61 episodes have aired in many countries and in nine languages. It has been aired on channels including Lifestyle Food in Australia and are also available on a series of four DVDs and online, Foxtel, SBSFood, ABC (Australian Broadcasting Commercial) and the AWE channel USA.

CHEESE SLICES Series 1–8, EPISODES 1-62

Series 1: Episode 1: Gorgonzola / Cave Ripened Tallegio Episode 2: Goats Cheese of Poitou – France Episode 3: Parmigiano Reggiano / Grana Padano Episode 4: Pecorino Episode 5: Camembert (Camembert de Normandie) Episode 6: Cheddar (English Cheddar)

Series 2: Episode 7: Comte Gruyere and Farmhouse Morbier Episode 8: The Irish Farmhouse Revolution Episode 9: The Legend of Roquefort Episode 10: Spanish traditional Quesos Episode 11: Australian Cheese Pioneers Episode 12: Stilton - The King of English Cheese Episode 13: Vermont Cheese USA

Series 3: Episode 14. GREECE – Feta: Food of the Gods Episode 15. THE BASQUE - Ossau Iraty Cheese Episode 16. FRANCE – Massif Central and Auvergne Episode 17. FRANCE – Soft Washed Rind Cheeses Episode 18. SAVOIE/FRANCHE COMTE - Cheeses of the Alps Episode 19. SWITZERLAND – Mountain Cheese Episode 20. THE NETHERLANDS Episode 21. USA – New Farmstead Cheeses of Northern California

Series 4: Episode 22. The Champion of English Cheese Episode 23. Twins of the Mediterranean – Corsica and Sardinia Episode 24. Mozzarella and the cheeses of Campania Italy Episode 25. Cheeses of Quebec Episode 26. Wisconsin USA Episode 27. Portugal Episode 28. Japan Episode 29. Artisan Cheese of USA Episode 30. Haloumi – Cyprus Episode 31. Japan – Special

Series 5: Episode 32: Cheeses of Norway Episode 33: Cheeses of Sicily Episode 34: Cheeses of Denmark Episode 35: Cheeses of Scotland Episode 36: Cheeses of Piemonte, Italy Episode 37: Cheeses of Wales Episode 38: Cheeses of Tasmania Episode 39: Cheeses of Provence Episode 40: Cheeses of Germany

Series 6: Episode 41: India Episode 42: Israel Episode 43: Bhutan Episode 44: Turkey Episode 45: French monks Episode 46: Italian Alps Episode 47: French Butter Episode 48: Catalonia Menorca

Series 7: Episode 49: Cheeses of Galicia, Spain Episode 50: Cheeses of Brazil Episode 51: Cheeses of British Columbia, Canada Episode 52: Cheeses of Washington State, USA Episode 53: Cheeses of Sweden Episode 54: Cheeses of Abruzzo, Italy Episode 55: Cheeses of Lyon, France

Series 8: Episode 56: Cheddar Cheese of England Episode 57: The Battle of real Camembert, France Episode 58: Traditional Shepard's Cheeses of the Pyrenees Episode 59: Cheese of La Mancha and Cabrales, Spain Episode 60: The Cheese Makers of Vermont, USA Episode 61: Roquefort Revisiting the King of blues

== Gourmet Traveller ==
Studd has contributed to one of Australia's leading food magazines for over 17 years on Gourmet Traveller

== Other Television Work ==
Studd was a guest judge on MasterChef on Network Ten's and multiple appearances as on What's Cooking? (Australia TV series).

== Family ==
Ellie Studd and Sam Studd are the youngest of Will's three children. They are members of the Guilde Internationale Des Fromagers and are ACS Certified Cheese Professionals . They source artisan cheeses for the ‘Selected by Will Studd’ range aimed at the US and Australian markets.

His eldest daughter Fleur Studd co-founded Melbourne Coffee Merchants and Market Lane Coffee in partnership with her father.

== See also ==
- List of cheesemakers
