= Capriole Goat Cheese =

Cheese producer in Indiana, US

Capriole Goat Cheese is an artisan goat cheese producer in Greenville, Indiana. Founded in 1988, Capriole is one of the oldest and most award-winning goat cheese producers in the United States. ABC News called it a great U.S.. creamery. The Creamery is Owned by Judith Schad and is based on an 80-acre farmstead of rolling hills in Greenville, Indiana.

== See also ==
- List of cheesemakers
