= Catherine Mathieson =

Cheese and butter producer (1818–1883)

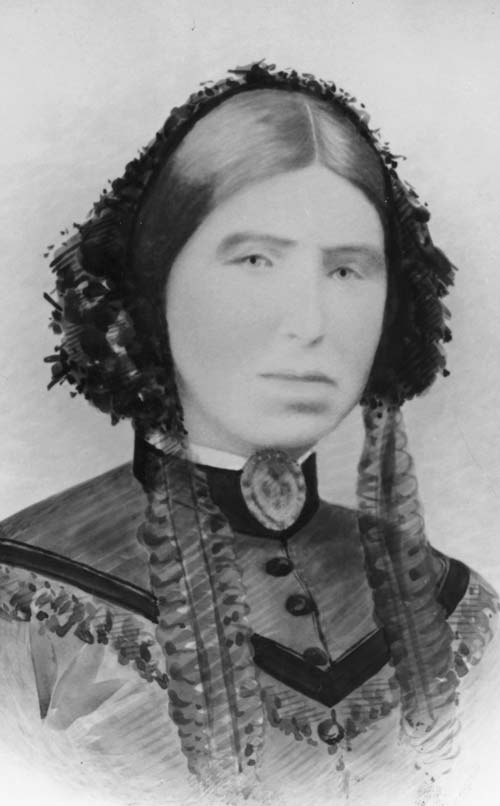
- Portrait, c. 1858
- Born: Catherine Johnstone; 11 December 1818; Lochmaben, Dumfriesshire, Scotland
- Died: 14 September 1883 (aged 64); Dunedin, New Zealand
- Occupations: Cheese maker; butter maker
- Spouse: John Mathieson (m. 1851)
- Children: 3

Catherine Mathieson (née Johnstone; 11 December 1818 – 14 September 1883) was a Scottish-born New Zealand cheese and butter maker, community leader.

== Biography ==
She was born in Lochmaben, Dumfriesshire, Scotland on 11 December 1818.

== See also ==
- List of cheesemakers
