= Chèvréchard =

French cheese manufacturer

Chèvréchard (French pronunciation: [ʃɛvʁeʃaʁ]) is a French cheese manufacturer specializing in goat cheeses. It is located in the goat-cheese producing region of Nouvelle-Aquitaine. In January 2007, the French dairy cooperative Valcrest acquired a 35% interest in the company, with the expectation of acquiring the balance later that year.

Chèvréchard is the producer of Clochette and Aperichevre cheeses.

== See also ==
- List of cheesemakers
