= Whitestone Cheese =

New Zealand cheese company

- Founded: 1987; 38 years ago
- Founders: Bob Berry; Sue Berry
- Headquarters: Oamaru, New Zealand
- Website: whitestonecheese.co.nz

Whitestone Cheese is one of the New Zealand South Island's leading cheese companies. The company is based in Oamaru, and takes its name from the limestone known as Oamaru stone which is quarried locally. The cheese is made with no artificial additives and milk from local regional livestock.

== History ==
Whitestone Cheese was founded in 1987 by Bob and Sue Berry, former farmers, in response to crippling droughts and a rural downturn in the 1980s. The company moved to new larger premises in Torridge Street, Oamaru in 1998, now employs over 70 people (as at October 2017), and now exports to countries such as the United States. Simon Berry is managing director.

- 1987: Established in a converted garage in Oamaru
- 1998: Moved into larger premises
- 2017: Factory expansion

== Cheese awards ==
Most of the company's cheese varieties have won awards. The company's original Farmhouse cheese won the 2005 Champion Original Cheese Award, with the Windsor Blue cheese winning the Champion of Champions Award at the 2006 New Zealand Cheese Awards. The same cheese won the gold medal in international competition the same year at the 2006 Brisbane International Cheese Awards. Since then the company has racked up a considerable number of other awards at the national level.

Cheese awards and medals for Whitestone Cheese
Year	Event	Awards and medals	Reference
2010	New Zealand Champions of Cheese awards	23 medals – six gold, nine silver, eight bronze Four gold awards for cheeses: Whitestone's Dansey Pass (goat); Vintage Windsor Blue (blue); Creamy Havarti (European-style); Island Stream (sheep's milk); Two gold awards for packaging – Whitestone's cheese tin and its four cheese platter sold in supermarkets	
2011	Cuisine New Zealand Champions of Cheese competition	Two awards and 34 medals (seven gold, 10 silver and 17 bronze) The two awards were for: Ecolab Champion Blue Cheese Award for Vintage Blue; New Zealand Specialist Cheese Association Cheese Packaging Award for its two-cheese platter	

== Cheese varieties ==
The company emphasises the regional nature of the cheese by naming its cheese varieties after local places. Whitestone makes 23 different specialist cheeses, the most well-known of which is Whitestone Windsor Blue. Other varieties made include Waitaki Camembert, Whitestone Farmhouse, Whitestone Brie, Mt Domet Double Cream Brie, Moeraki Bay Blue, Highland Blue, Totara Tasty, Manuka Feta, and four sheep's milk cheeses (notably Monte Cristo). Three goat's milk cheeses are also made: Parson's Rock, Duntroon and Danseys Pass.

== See also ==
- List of cheesemakers
