= Nature's Harmony Farm =

Artisanal cheese operation located in Elberton, Georgia, US

Coordinates: 39.77420°N 75.21103°W

- Company type: Limited liability company
- Industry: Cheesemaking
- Founded: 2008
- Founder: Tim and Liz Young
- Headquarters: 1984 Bakers Ferry Rd, Elberton, Georgia, United States
- Products: Artisanal cheese
- Website: naturesharmonyfarm.com

Nature's Harmony Farm LLC is an artisanal cheese operation located in Elberton, Georgia.

It is a privately owned Limited Liability Company that has been featured in The New York Times, CNN, and Garden & Gun Magazine.

Nature's Harmony Farm was founded in 2008. The farm is owned and operated by Tim and Liz Young.

The farm originally produced pastured raised poultry, eggs, and meats, but ceased producing commercial production of all of these items in 2011. The focus of the farm became dairy operations with Jersey cows in 2010, at which point the farm began producing farmstead cheese. This became the primary focus of the farming enterprise in 2012.

Today, Nature's Harmony Farm produces several varieties of handmade artisan cheese that have won national and international awards, and a Good Food Award. In 2015 Nature's Harmony won third award at the United States Cheese Championship.
