= Clochette =

Brand of French goat cheese

- Country of origin: France
- Region: Nouvelle-Aquitaine
- Source of milk: goats
- Pasteurized: yes
- Texture: firm, dense, and smooth
- Aging time: fresh-ripened (2-3 weeks)

Clochette (French pronunciation: [klɔʃɛt]; French for "little bell") is a bell-shaped, mold-ripened goat cheese from the Nouvelle-Aquitaine region in France that is made by Chèvréchard, a goat cheese maker. Clochette is matured for two weeks and has a shelf life of about 45 days. It has a wrinkled, edible white rind; and a firm, dense, velvety texture. The older the clochette, the more wrinkled its surface and the firmer its inner texture. It has a well-balanced, non-challenging, tangy, and goaty flavor.

== Life cycle ==
Clochette cheese is created mainly during the summertime, from March to sometime in fall. It is mold-ripened and matures for two weeks before heading off to be sold. It only lasts for 45 days, so it has to sell fast. The older it gets, the more wrinkly it gets, until finally it is too old and can no longer be eaten.

== A typical bell ==
A typical bell weighs around 9 oz (260 g). It has a 8 to 9 cm diameter base and stands 9 cm tall.

== See also ==
- List of goat milk cheeses
