= Thelma Adams (farmer) =

Welsh farmer and activist (1938–2024)

- as Cleopatra in 1984
- Born: 10 November 1938
- Died: 2024 (aged 86)
- Occupations: Cheesemonger; activist
- Spouse: Gwynfor Adams (m. 1961)
- Children: 2

Thelma Adams (10 November 1938 – 2024) was a Welsh farmer and activist. After unsuccessfully protesting against milk quotas under the European Commission's Common Agricultural Policy, she and her husband restarted the family cheese producer Caws Cenarth Cheese as managing director, winning accolades and acclaim for her cheese.

== Early life ==
Thelma Adams was born on 10 November 1938, and raised in the Pant y Blaidd inn in Llanfyrnach. In 1961, she married Gwynfor Adams, and they moved to their farm Glyneithinog; located in Boncath, the family business Caws Cenarth had been producing cheese there since 1903.

== Career ==
In 1984, with plans to implement milk quotas in the United Kingdom under the European Commission's Common Agricultural Policy, Adams protested by sitting in a bathtub full of milk as it was driven throughout Carmarthen, while dressed as Cleopatra. She stated that the idea of the protest was to show that "it was cheaper to bathe in milk than water". The BBC reported that this incident "brought [the town] to a standstill."

After the milk quotas were still introduced and resulted in potential financial issues with the farm, Adams and her husband restarted Caws Cenarth at Glyneithinog in 1986, becoming the farm's first managing director herself; she once told the Carmarthen Journal that "my mother made cheese so it was in my blood". She had originally considered making butter, but found "no delight in making [it]". She also went to a Ministry of Agriculture, Fisheries and Food course in cheesemaking.

In 1986, the Adams couple's cheese won the 1986 Edible Ideas competition. In December 1987, the Adams couple hosted ADAS director-general Ronald Leslie Bell at their farm. In 1988, she was appointed to a non-statutory agriculture panel by Secretary of State for Wales Peter Walker. In March 1989, Brendan Berry of The Daily Telegraph called Adams "one of Wales's best known cheesemakers". She was runner-up for the 1989 Welsh Agricultural Organisation Society/NatWest Marketing Initiative Award.

In 1991, the Adams couple won first prize in dairy products at the South West Dairy Show and entered a Radio Times Enterprise competition. In Saint David's Day 1993, she promoted her cheese at the Selfridges flagship store in London. In 1997, Malcolm Smith of The Independent recommended her cheesemaking as a tourist attraction. In July 1997, she reportedly got a request for a sample from Charles, Prince of Wales (now Charles III). She was one of several farmers interviewed for Ron Davies' Working Lives: Voices from Rural Wales online initiative. In December 1998, she was a non-winning finalist for the National Farmers' Union's Welsh Woman Farmer of the Year. By 1999, her customers included Caerphilly County Borough Council, Fortnum & Mason, and Harrods.

In September 1999, Adams protested Caerphilly County Borough Council's campaign to assign protected geographical status to Caerphilly cheese, which would restrict its production to Caerphilly. In 2015, amid concerns about another financial downturn in the dairy industry due to a recent drop in milk prices, she called for agricultural families to address the crisis with a publicity stunt similar to hers.

Adams was still a director of Caws Cenarth as late as 2022. The company received two Royal Warrants for supplying their organic cheese to Charles III: in 2022 and 2024.

== Personal life and death ==
She was married to Gwynfor Adams until his death on 15 October 2021 at 87. They had two children: Carwyn, who had taken over as managing director of Caws Cenarth by 2020, and Caroline, who runs an artisan cracker brand called Hedyn Aur and also worked as a volunteer nurse.

Both Thelma and Gwynfor spoke Welsh. She later moved out of her Glyneithinog farmhouse and into a flat, and afterwards the farm's dairy production facilities had been modernized by 2022.

In addition to cheesemaking, the Adamses bred a pedigree herd of Holstein Friesian cows, whose milk would be used for her cheese.

Adams died in 2024, aged 86.
