= Mausam Narang =

Indian entrepreneur (born 1986 or 1987)

- Born: 1986 or 1987
- Occupations: Cheesemaker, entrepreneur
- Years active: 2015–present
- Known for: Founder of Eleftheria Cheese

Mausam Narang (born 1986 or 1987) is an Indian artisanal cheesemaker and entrepreneur based in Mumbai. She is the founder of Eleftheria, a brand that produces European-style cheeses using local Indian ingredients. Narang has received international acclaim for her work, including multiple awards at the World Cheese Awards and the Mundial do Queijo do Brasil.

== Early life and education ==
Mausam Narang was born and raised in Mulund, Mumbai. She went to the United Kingdom to complete a masters in human resource management.

== Career ==
=== Human resources (2005–2015) ===
Narang worked in human resources for corporations in France and Germany for eight years. While she lived in Europe, she developed an interest in diverse cheese varieties, such as the German Butterkäse and the English cloth-bound cheddar.

By 2013, she had moved to Mumbai. While still employed in the IT firm Capgemini, she began baking sourdough bread at home. Due to a lack of high-quality artisanal cheese in the local market to pair with her bread, she began experimenting with cheesemaking in her mother's kitchen on weekends.

She initially imported cheesemaking ingredients in small quantities. She then scouted Indian dairy farms for many months to find the right quality of milk for her cheesemaking.

By 2015, Narang decided to leave her corporate career to focus on cheesemaking. As there were no formal cheesemaking schools in India at the time, she taught herself through extensive reading and trial and error. She later trained with master cheesemakers in Italy.

=== Eleftheria (2015–present) ===
Narang founded Eleftheria in 2015, initially operating from a small rented space with a single assistant. She then went to pop-up sales and farmer's markets to understand her customer base.

In 2016, Narang began supplying boutique restaurants in Mumbai after receiving validation from chefs from prominent Mumbai restaurants. The company's operations eventually moved to a creamery in Bhandup. During the COVID-19 pandemic, Narang expanded the business into the direct-to-consumer (B2C) market by launching an online shop and offering specialized cheese boards.

By 2026, the company had grown to a team of 65 employees, supplying major hospitality groups such as the Taj and Oberoi groups, as well as numerous high-end restaurants across Indian metropolitan areas.

== Awards and recognition ==
Narang's products have been recognized at the World Cheese Awards annually since 2021, when they won a Silver medal. This made her the first Indian to win an award at the World Cheese Awards.

In 2023, Eleftheria won World's Best Cheese of the Year award in Norway. Her cheeses won two medals in the Super Gold and one in the Gold categories.

In 2026, at the fourth edition of the Mundial do Queijo do Brasil—a prestigious blind-tasting competition featuring nearly 2,700 entries—her cheeses won medals in the Super Gold, Gold and Silver categories.

Following these victories, Narang and her team received formal recognition and public commendation from the Prime Minister of India for their contributions to the artisanal craft in the country.
