= Point Reyes Farmstead Cheese Company =

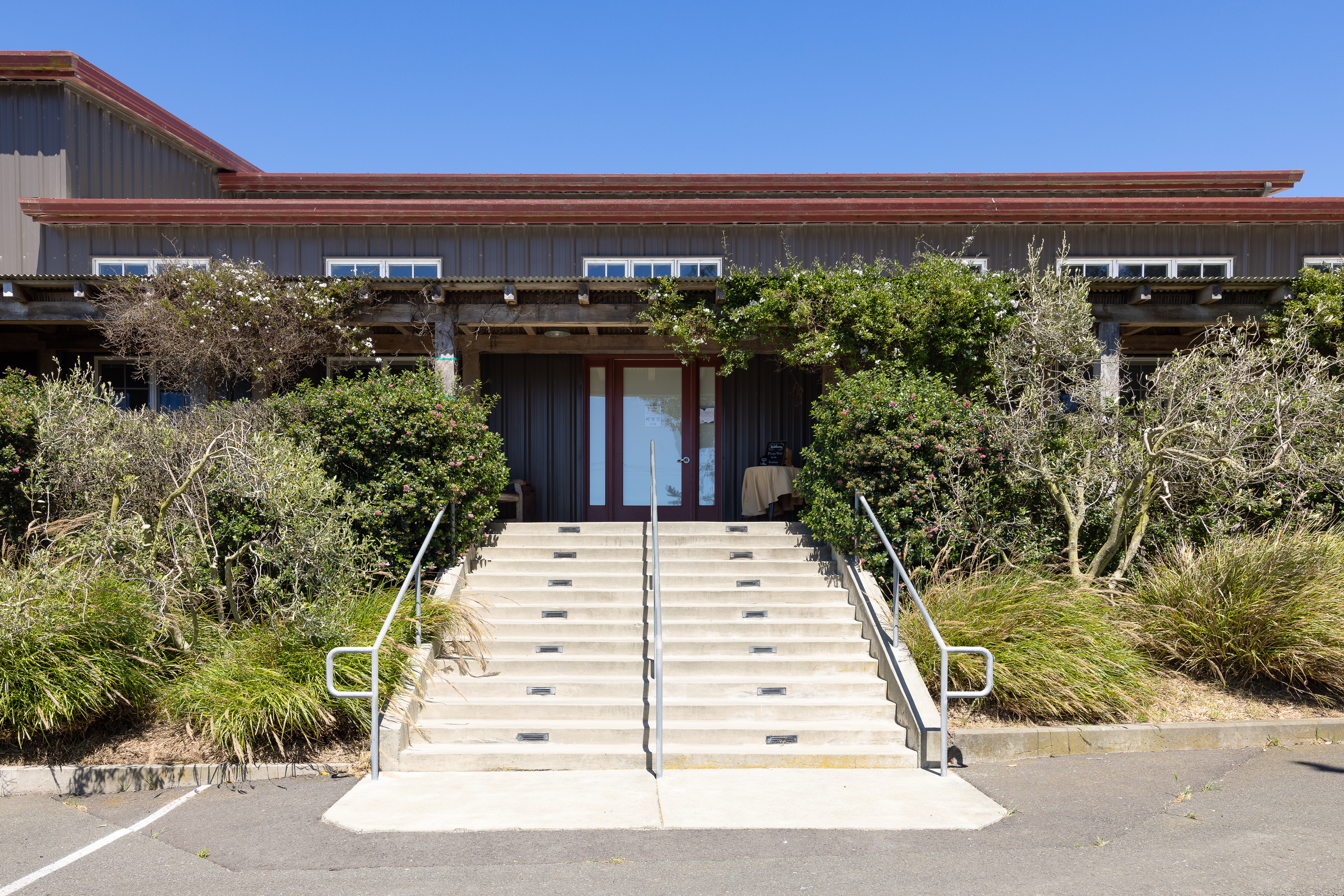
Entrance to The Fork, the culinary education center operated by Point Reyes Farmstead Cheese Company

Point Reyes Farmstead Cheese Company is an artisanal cheese company located in Point Reyes Station in Marin County, California with dairy farmland located in the Point Reyes area. The company received the 2013 California Leopold Conservation Award, and has been featured on the Today Show. The company was founded by Bob Giacomini and his four daughters, Karen Howard, Diana Hagan, Lynn Stray and Jill Basch. Co-founder Dean Mae Giacomini, Mr. Giacomini's wife, died in 2012. The company is now WBENC-certified Women-Owned and led by Co-CEOs Jill, Lynn and Diana. The Point Reyes dairy's operations began in 1959. The cheese company was founded in 2000. The family also operates The Fork, a culinary education center. Their flagship, award-winning cheese, the raw milk Point Reyes Original Blue was the only blue cheese produced in California when it was introduced.

== See also ==
- List of cheesemakers
