= Uplands Cheese Company =

Uplands Cheese Company is a dairy farm and artisan cheesemaker in Dodgeville, Wisconsin, U.S.

ABC News called the business a great American creamery. Their Pleasant Ridge Reserve was chosen by the Food Network's Simon Majumdar as one of the 10 best foods in the US, and has won numerous awards.
