= Sweet Grass Dairy =

Sweet Grass Dairy is a company located in Thomasville, Georgia, United States, which produces old world handcrafted cheeses. Founded in 2000, by Al and Desiree Wehner, Sweet Grass Dairy creates artisan cheeses (including the award winning Green Hill) and distributes its cheeses across the U.S. In 2005, Sweet Grass Dairy was purchased by the Wehners' daughter Jessica and their son-in-law Jeremy Little. Sweet Grass Dairy produces only cow's milk cheeses, using milk from the Wehners' nearby Green Hill Dairy. Beginning in 2010, Sweet Grass Dairy also operates a Cheese Shop in downtown Thomasville.

Sweet Grass Dairy utilizes rotational grazing in its dairying practices which emphasizes keeping animals on open pastures instead of concrete barn floors. Their regular cow cheeses include Thomasville Tomme, Georgia Gouda, and Asher Blue. A few special cow cheeses are Clayburne, Black Swan, Heat, Cyprus, Harvest, and Lil' Moo. Sweet Grass Dairy announced in September 2011 that it will no longer produce goat's milk cheeses.
