= American Cheese Society =

Non-profit trade group for the American cheese industry

- Abbreviation: ACS
- Formation: 1983; 43 years ago
- Founder: Frank V. Kosikowski
- Type: Nonprofit
- Tax ID no.: 04-2900272
- Purpose: Cheese education
- Professional title: ACS Certified Cheese Professional®, ACS Certified Cheese Sensory Evaluator®
- Headquarters: Englewood, Colorado
- Region served: The Americas
- Field: Cheesemaking
- Members: 2,400 (2024)
- Website: www.cheesesociety.org

The American Cheese Society (ACS) is a non-profit trade group for the American cheese industry that was founded in 1983.

ACS promotes American cheeses, provides the industry with educational resources and networking opportunities and encourages high standards of Cheesemaking with safety and sustainability. ACS issues awards for cheeses and cultured dairy products in its annual Judging & Competition. Since 1983, cheesemakers, retailers, distributors, importers/exporters, dairy farmers, academics, enthusiasts, specialty food producers, and others have attended the association's Annual Conference. ACS has 2,400 members worldwide, which is an almost doubling of membership in the last decade. Professional membership is those working in the industry, and Associate for non-professionals.

ACS was founded by Frank Kosikowski, a professor at Cornell University. Kosikowski authored several books on cheese, including Cheese and Fermented Milk Food. During the 1980s, most of the ACS staff was volunteer. By the 1990s, ACS had grown along with the American cheese industry.

== Objective ==
ACS has an alliance nonprofit organization called "the American Cheese Education Foundation (ACEF)". ACEF is a 501(c)(3) charitable organization. The nonprofit organization aims to raise funds that support education for the cheese industry, led by the ACS members.

== Events and education ==
ACS holds an annual conference and competition in the United States.

ACS also developed and administers the ACS Certified Cheese Professional Exam (ACS CCP Exam) and the ACS T.A.S.T.E. Test, which one must pass to receive the ACS Certified Cheese Sensory Evaluator credential.

ACS organizes the American Cheese Month every October. The month-long event promotes the American cheese industry and increased funding for the American Cheese Education Foundation.

== See also ==
- List of cheesemakers
