= Laura Chenel =

American cheesemaker (born 1948 or 1949)

- Born: 1948 or 1949 (age 76–77)
- Education: University of California, Santa Cruz
- Occupation: Cheesemaker
- Partner: John Van Dyke

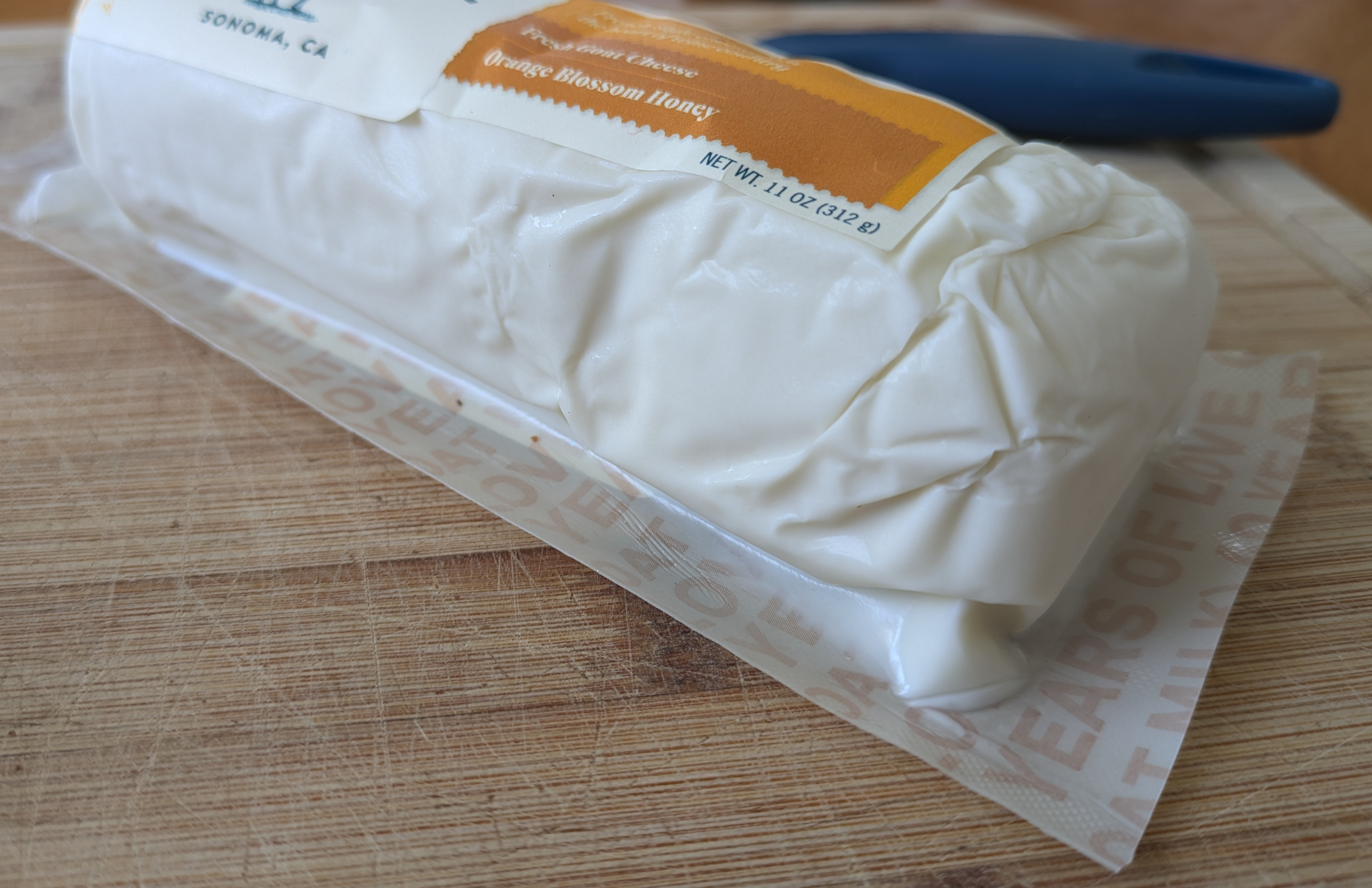
Laura Chenel goat cheese

Laura Chenel (born c. 1948–1949) is an American cheesemaker from Sonoma, California, specializing in the production of goat cheese. Chenel's commercial creamery, Laura Chenel Chevre, sold over two million pounds of cheese annually when it was sold to the Rians Group in 2006.

== Career ==
=== Early career ===
Starting in the mid 1970s, Chenel began assisting with daily operations at her parents' turkey ranch and nearby family restaurant in Sebastopol, California. While working on the ranch, Chenel converted an enclosed area near the restaurant into a shelter for her first goats and used their milk to produce yogurt and kefir.

After expanding her herd, Chenel approached the Redwood Empire Dairy Goat Association (REDGA) with a proposal to produce cheese from surplus milk. In collaboration with the association, she established a cooperative. She subsequently visited cheese retailers in San Francisco, Sacramento, and Berkeley to assess market requirements.

=== Making of the French-style American goat cheese ===
A clerk at the Say Cheese store in San Francisco’s Cole Street introduced Chenel to fresh French cheese made from raw milk and coated in ash. Preferring the flavor of this goat cheese method, Chenel began looking for someone to teach her the process for making fresh French cheese. She enrolled at Sonoma State University to study the French language for a year. One of her professors, Adele Friedman, helped her write to Jean-Claude Le Jaouen, the head of L'Institut Technique de l'Élevage Ovin et Caprin (ITOVIC), Paris, and the author of The Fabrication of Farmstead Goat Cheese (1990). He told Chenel that if she came to France, he would find a way to assist her. In 1979, she spent three and a half months in France, apprenticing with four farmstead cheesemakers across Angoulême, Carcassonne, and Joigny.

Chenel returned from France with mold specimens from each farmstead she had visited. In 1979, she lived with her goats on Vine Hill Road in Sonoma County, near Dehlinger Winery. She set up the basement of her house to make cheese, but she was initially unsuccessful. "There were years of established bacteria there, more virulent than the natural cheese bacteria I was attempting to encourage," she explained. About a month and a half later, the microbial environment stabilized, and the cheese began to form with the "correct taste and texture." Chenel made ash-coated chabis, pyramids, and crottin from blue mold. The crottin is said to have become “very hard and dry.” She started selling her products at farmers' markets, but due to a lack of persistent market demand, she pivoted to experimenting with white mold. It was the eight-ounce chèvre that gained Chenel significant recognition after Alice Waters of Chez Panisse tried the cheese at a farmers' market in 1981. Waters began ordering 50 pounds of chèvre a week for a salad recipe that featured breaded and baked discs of Chenel's cheese on a bed of mesclun greens, which became a staple of the restaurant's menu. The same year, Chenel moved to Ridley Avenue in Santa Rosa, California, where she converted a former food processing plant into a cheese factory. She spent the next twelve years at the Ridley facility and eventually gave up her goats to focus entirely on cheesemaking. “I had a certain absolute standard about what had to happen for them, and I was so into this cheese that I couldn’t do it,” she said.

Roberta Klugman, who worked with a distributor for Chenel in the 1980s and at a retail shop where Chenel's cheese was sold, said that her goat cheese "was highly regarded alongside Montrachet." According to Klugman, there was a "great enthusiasm for supporting Californian and American producers, but for the most part, restaurants still wanted to stay with the French products." By the mid-1990s, goat cheese had grown in popularity, and Chenel's company started selling over 2 million pounds of cheese annually.

=== Moving back to Sonoma County ===
In 1993, Chenel moved back to Sonoma County and took over the former Clover-Stornetta Farms bottling plant to "boost production and consolidate her herd of goats." In 1995, she started with 12 goats, later adding 80 more from across Wyoming, South Dakota, and Idaho. The first goats of her new herd were Saanens. Eventually, she added more breeds, including Anglo-Nubians, Toggenburgers, Alpines, and American Lamanchas, growing her herd to 500 goats.

=== Selling to Rians International ===
In October 2005, Chenel received a call from an intermediary hired by Hugues Triballat of Rians International in France. Triballat had been selling a few of his cheese products in America and wanted to further expand within the American market. Triballat and Chenel met two months later to discuss a potential sale. Though Chenel was not interested in selling when Rians first approached her, she was impressed by Triballat's "attention to quality and craft."

In 2006, the French dairy company Rians acquired the equipment needed, including vats, pasteurizers, and packaging lines from Chenel's Stornetta plant for an undisclosed sum. She retained her herd of 500 goats, continuing to supply milk to Rians, and her staff of 18 employees transitioned to the new ownership. Rians continued to lease the 15-acre former milk dairy and bottling plant owned by the Stornetta family until 2011.

By 2023, Rians had expanded its supply chain to source goat milk from eight farms across California, Oregon, Nevada, and Idaho. During this period, the company actively pursued further expansion of its dairy base to address increasing customer demand.

== Personal life ==
Chenel has been in a relationship with John Van Dyke, former cheesemaker and general manager of her company, since the late 1990s. As of 2007, she lives in the hills above Sonoma Valley and spends her time gardening and tending to her goat herd.

== See also ==
- List of cheesemakers
