= Artisan cheese =

Cheeses produced by hand using traditional craftsmanship

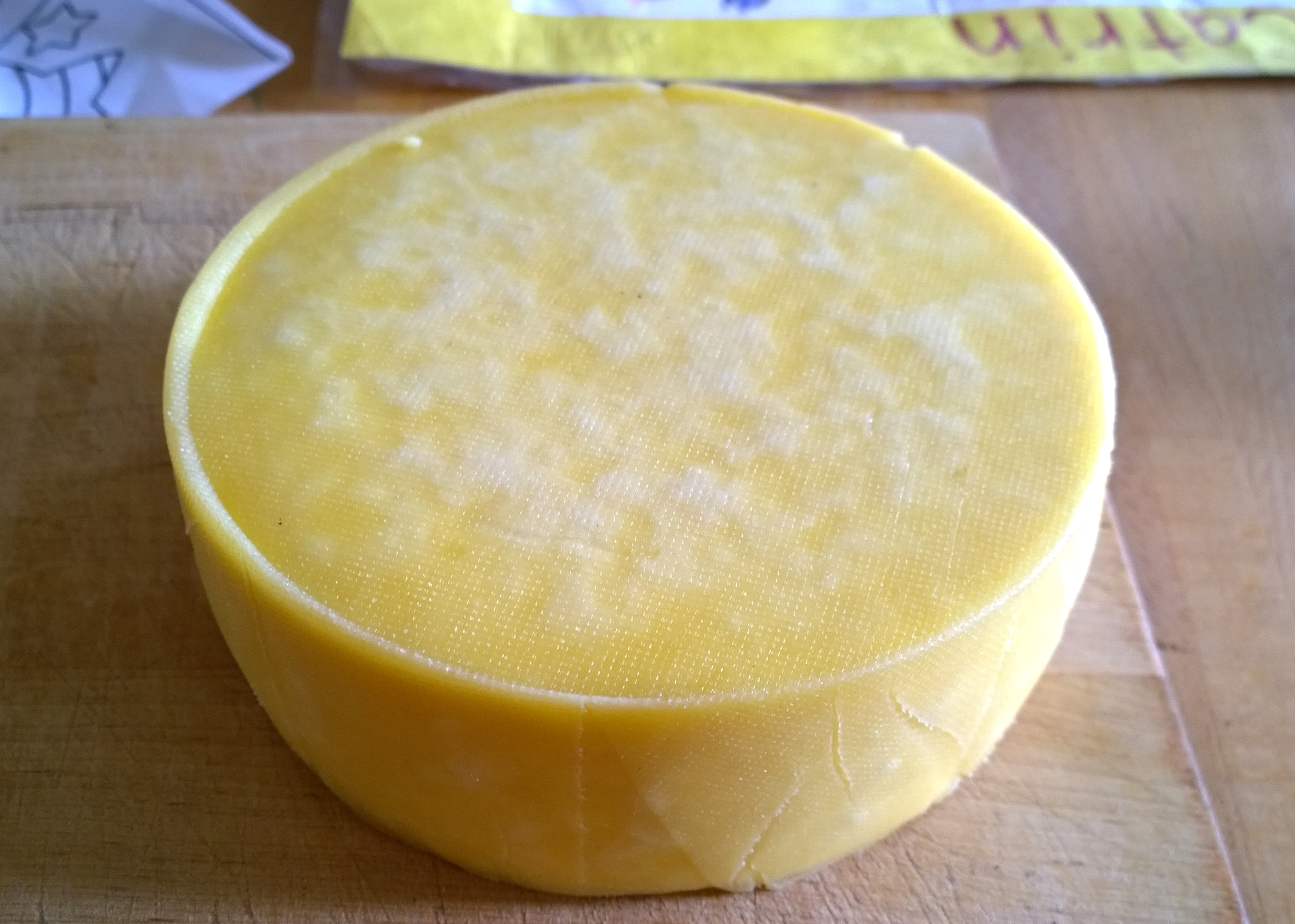
A wheel of homemade cheddar

Artisanal cheese refers to cheeses produced by hand using the traditional craftsmanship of skilled cheesemakers. As a result, the cheeses are often more complex in taste and variety. Many are aged and ripened to achieve certain aesthetics. This contrasts with the more mild flavors of mass-produced cheeses produced in large-scale operations, often shipped and sold right away.

Part of the artisanal cheese-making process is the aging and ripening of the cheeses to develop flavor and textural characteristics. One type of artisanal cheese is known as farmstead cheese, made traditionally with milk from the producer's own herds of cows, sheep, and goats. Artisan cheeses may be made by mixing milk from multiple farms, whereas the more strict definition of farmstead cheese (or farmhouse cheese) requires that milk come only from one farm.

== Definition ==
According to the American Cheese Society:

The word 'artisan' or 'artisanal' implies that a cheese is produced primarily by hand, in small batches, with particular attention paid to the tradition of the cheesemaker's art and thus using as little mechanization as possible in production of the cheese. Artisan, or artisanal, cheese may be made from all types of milk and may include various flavorings.

== Process ==
The artisanal cheesemaking process can be quite extensive and resembles modern chemistry in many aspects. Many different factors affect a finished artisanal cheese product; these include, but are not limited to, what species of grass is consumed by the cattle that provided the milk source, any sudden changes of heat, and any loss of cultivated yeast, or changes in barometric pressure. These factors to an extent are different from large commercial cheesemakers, and affect artisanal cheese more heavily.

== Popularity ==
In the 2000s, the American artisanal cheese industry saw an increase in artisan creameries being licensed for commercial business, greater than that in the twenty years prior. This translated to approximately 450 different artisan cheese makers existing in the United States. Three regions came to lead the way in this category, New England, Wisconsin, and California. This rise in the popularity of artisan cheesemaking has also coincided with a rise in the number of dairy farms, while traditional cattle ranching has been decreasing in numbers.

== Use of wooden surfaces ==
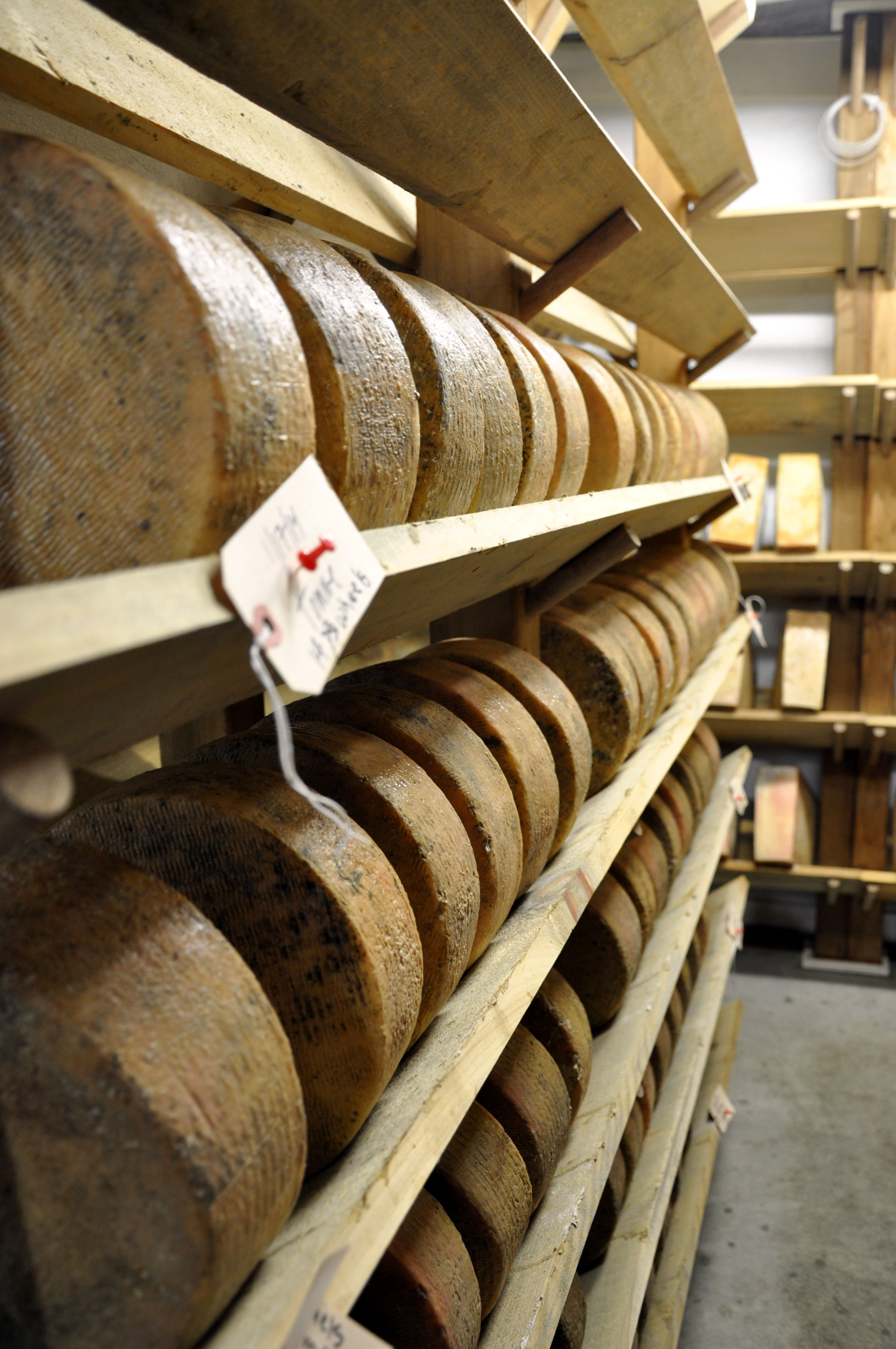
Cheese ageing on wooden shelves

In January 2014, Monica Metz, Branch Chief of the Food and Drug Administration's Center for Food Safety and Applied Nutrition's Dairy and Egg Branch, responded to a New York State Department of Agriculture request asking the FDA to clarify if using wooden surfaces to age cheese was acceptable. In her response, Metz said the use of wooden surfaces to ripen cheese did not conform to the Current Good Manufacturing Practices. Metz cited 21 CFR 110.40(a), to support her stance on the issue.

This statement caused concern among artisanal cheesemakers process and their customers, as well as those who imported cheese from other nations. Many groups including the American Cheese Society, a nonprofit trade association which promotes and supports American cheeses, signed a letter on June 10, 2014, arguing against the FDA stance on using wooden surfaces to ripen cheese. The American Cheese Society stressed their stance on strict safety standards during the American cheesemaking process.

On June 11, 2014, the FDA sent an update regarding their earlier stance on the issue. In the update, the FDA stressed that they were not requiring the prohibiting or banning of wooden surfaces in the cheesemaking process. Furthermore, they stated there is no Food Safety Modernization Act that specifically mentions the use of wooden surfaces needed in the cheesemaking process. The FDA advised they would reach out to and engage the artisanal cheesemaking community, in coming together to resolve the issue.

== See also ==
- Artisan Cheese Making Academy Australia
- Artisanal food
- List of cheeses
- List of cheesemakers
- Specialty foods
