= Besnier =

Besnier may refer to:

- Besnier (locksmith), a French who attempted to fly using two paddle-like wings (1678); see Wright Brothers National Memorial
- Emmanuel Besnier (born 1971), French businessman
- Ernest Besnier (1831–1909), French dermatologist
- Jean-Michel Besnier (born c. 1968), French billionaire heir and major shareholder of Lactalis
- Marie Besnier Beauvalot (born c. 1981), French billionaire heiress and major shareholder of Lactalis
- Michel Besnier (1928–2000), former CEO of Lactalis
- Maurice Besnier (1873–1933), French historian
- Besnier Boeck disease, a systemic granulomatous inflammatory disease characterized by non-caseating granulomas
- Lactalis, French dairy company formerly known as Besnier
