= Silverwood Dairy =

Silverwood Dairy was a London, Ontario, Canada, dairy company that operated in the early 20th century and was later acquired as a brand name by Ault Foods.

== History ==
=== Founding owner and early years ===
Silverwood Dairy was founded by Albert Edward Silverwood (b. February 15, 1876, d. December 2, 1961). Silverwood was born on a farm near the village of Oakwood (located west of Lindsay, Ontario) and attended Oakwood Public School and Lindsay Collegiate Institute.

In 1901, he married Eva M. Ferris, of Lindsay and had one son (Edward Gordon), and one daughter (Dorothy Marie).

Silverwood was President and Managing Director of Silverwood Industries Limited of London, Ontario. The company was a dealer in cold storage products and a manufacturer of ice cream and butter; it began operations in London and provided services across Ontario. In 1966 it acquired Calgary-based United Dairies. Over the course of Silverwood's existence it acquired a number of smaller dairies and other assets:

- Willards Cream Top Dairy (Toronto), 1929
- City Dairy (Winnipeg), 1943
- Campbell's Dairy (Peterborough), approx. 1960
- Mac's Convenience Stores, 1972 (40% in 1963)
- Royal Oak Dairy, 1976

Later in life, Silverwood established the A.E. Silverwood Foundation (1948). He died in 1961 and is entombed in Woodland Cemetery Mausoleum, London, Ontario in between his two wives.

=== Legacy ===
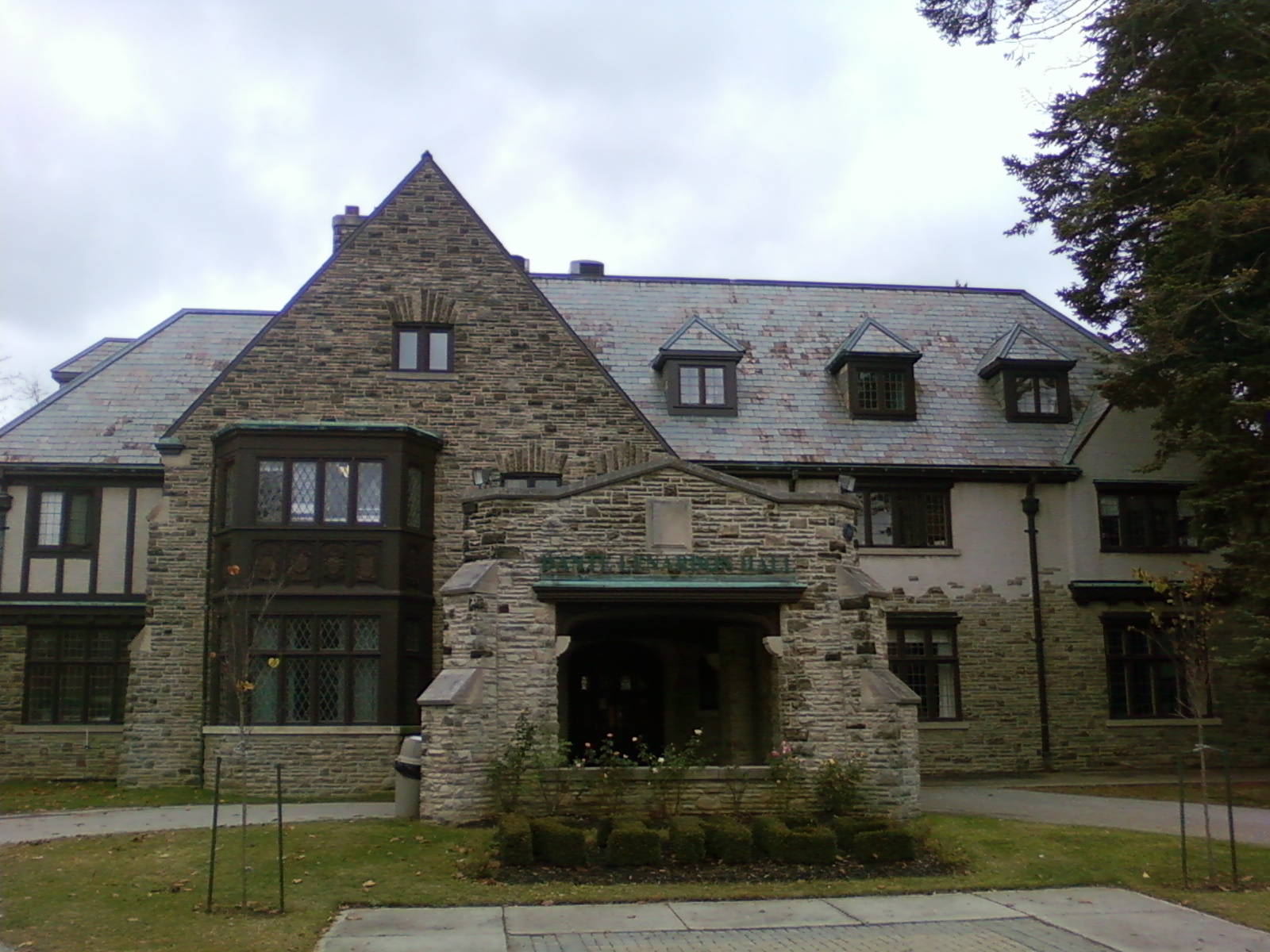
The former Silverwood Mansion, now a campus building of King's University College (University of Western Ontario)

Silverwood's mansion in his home town of London was home to the University of Western Ontario's Faculty of Music and School of Business Administration. The Tudor Revival A.E. Silverwood Building is now called Dante Lenardon Hall. Silverwood Skating Rink in London was also named for him.

The Silverwood family never lived in this house. Mr Silverwood was a great supporter of Western's School of Music, and his donations went towards the purchase of this building for the use of the Music programme. UWO subsequently used it as part of the Law faculty, and later it was bought by King's University College and renamed Lenardon Hall after a revered founding scholar and teacher.

=== Growth and demise ===
Silverwood Dairy continued to grow after the departure of A.E. Silverwood. The company expanded in and beyond Ontario and acquired a number of smaller dairies. By 1984, Silverwood was taken over by the John Labatts Limited-owned Ault Foods and the name was carried on as a milk brand. While the dairy disappeared, the Silverwood brand continued. The Calgary branch was acquired by the Southern Alberta Dairy Pool in 1977. The company was sold in the 1990s to Agropur and slowly disappeared. The non dairy part of Silverwood was renamed Silcorp Limited (1978) and became a Toronto-based operator of the Mac's Convenience chain. Silcorp acquired Mac's rival Becker's in 1996. The Silverwood name and brand disappeared for good in 1999 when the company was acquired by Couche-Tard.

== Operations ==
- Calgary
- Cargill
- Chatham
- Edmonton
- Kitchener/Waterloo
- London
- Lucknow
- Peterborough
- Regina
- Sarnia
- St. Catharines
- Stratford
- Toronto
- Woodstock
- Windsor
- Winnipeg

== Products ==
- Cream
- Butter
- Milk
- Ice cream
- Popsicles and frozen novelties
- Chocolate pudding (ready-to-serve)

== Trivia ==
Albert's brother, William Alexander Silverwood, moved to Saskatoon, Saskatchewan in 1907. He became a successful cattle rancher and operated a bottling plant north of the city. The present-day neighbourhood of Silverwood Heights, which occupies his former farmland, bears his name.

== See also ==
- Parmalat Canada
  - Beatrice Foods Canada
  - Ault Foods
  - Sealtest Dairy
  - Bill Gordon who lived on Forest Hill Rd, Toronto, recalls working during the summers of 1954-1955 as a helper to the operator of the horse-drawn milk route in that area. Milk and cream bottles were glass at the time and were left out for return. His job involved delivering usually to a side door milk box, common in many homes at the time. Many customers had recurring orders; otherwise, it would mean two trips to the door. Payment was commonly ‘on account’, cash, or by tickets issued by Silverwoods. His compensation was minimal: often just a bottle of chocolate milk and the beloved opportunity to care for the horse - feeding, watering and grooming.

Les Mandelbaum formerly of Westgrove Avenue remembers horse drawn delivery from Silverwoods in the early 1950s.

Keith Alton (b. July 22, 1926; d. February 24, 2013) of Peterborough, ON, a former Campbell's Dairy co-owner, managed Silverwood's Peterborough operations during the 1960s and into the 1970s.
