= Ault Foods =

Canadian dairy processing company

Ault Foods Limited was a Toronto-based dairy processor and Canada's largest dairy company acquiring other dairy companies across Canada. The company was established in 1891. In the 1930s, it was sold to Ogilvie Flour Mills. In 1968, it became part of John Labatt Limited's food division. In 1997, it was bought by Parmalat and folded into Parmalat Canada. Parmalat Canada was sold to Lactalis and now operates Lactalis Canada out of the former Ault Foods headquarters.

== History ==
Company founder John (Jack) Wesley Ault first began producing cheese in the hamlet of Cass Bridge, Ontario, near Winchester, Ontario in 1891. In 1932, Ault moved operations to Winchester, opening a cheese factory there. The Ault family continued to run the company after Jack Ault's death, passing the reins to Ken Ault, and later, Sam Ault in 1964.

The company went through several changes of ownership, becoming a subsidiary of Montreal's Ogilvie Flour Mills in the late 1930s upon the death of Jack Ault. It was later purchased by John Labatt Limited in 1968. Under Sam Ault's leadership, Ault Foods expanded, becoming the largest producer of cheese, butter and skim milk in Canada. By 1973, Ault produced 12 million pounds of cheese, 15 million pounds of skim milk and 10 million pounds of butter annually. In 1975, Ault purchased the milk producer Cow and Gate Ltd., which gave it access to double the amount of milk to process. In 1981, Ault purchased several Ontario dairies. It purchased Dominion Dairies, which included the Canadian licensing rights to the American Sealtest brand name, Copper Cliff Dairy of Sudbury, Ontario, and Balderson Cheese of Balderson, Ontario. In 1982, Ault purchased New Dundee Creamery of New Dundee, Ontario. Ault purchased Silverwood Dairy in 1983. The sum of these purchases meant that Labatt had 50% of the Ontario dairy market. In 1984, Graham Freeman succeeded Sam Ault as president and CEO.

Ault continued to grow through acquisition. In 1986, Ault purchased Groupe Lactantia dairy products company of Quebec. That year, Labatt reported that Ault, now headquartered in Etobicoke had 18 plants and 2,690 employees. In 1990, Ault purchased the Neilson ice cream business, which included its Neilson and Häagen-Dazs brands, ice cream making machinery and the 180 Neilson ice cream-making employees.

That same year, the company's chairman told a House of Commons of Canada committee that, due to import pressures, and the higher cost of milk in Canada meant that Ault was not a profitable business and was considering closing down. However, Labatt reported that its Canadian food division was more profitable than its US division. In 1996, Ault was facing further pressure, now from possible takeovers, including what it considered a hostile bid from Saputo Inc.. It sold its frozen products division in 1996 to Nestle Canada for CA$221 million, which included the former Neilson ice cream factory in London, Ontario. Part of the proceeds were intended to buy back some of its shares.

== Parmalat Canada ==
Labatt sold Ault to Parmalat in 1997. This was the result of a solicited bid to prevent a takeover by Saputo Inc. The sale was completed in July 1997 for CA$415 million, several months after Parmalat had bought Beatrice Foods for CA$290 million. The Ault Foods name was retired by Parmalat Canada and Freeman left the company. Parmalat merged Ault's operations with Beatrice and sold its Ontario fluid milk operations to Agropur, including the Sealtest licensing rights, retaining its Quebec fluid milk business. Later that year, Parmalat purchased the Belleville Black Diamond Cheese factory. The resulting operation was Canada's largest dairy, with 19 operating units and sales of CA$2.5 billion in 2002.

Parmalat entered bankruptcy protection in 2003 with US$18.5 billion in debt. It restructured, selling companies in ten countries, but retained its operations in Canada.

== Lactalis Canada ==
Lactalis purchased a controlling 90% share of Parmalat in 2011. A Lactalis Canada plant now operates on the Winchester location of the 1932 factory, employing 300 people and producing Black Diamond cheese. Lactalis Canada continues to be headquartered in Etobicoke. In 2018, KraftHeinz agreed to sell its 'natural cheese' operations to Lactalis for US$1.8 billion. This included a factory in Ingleside, Ontario and the brands of Cracker Barrel, P'tit Quebec and aMOOza. In 2022, Lactalis converted its dairy operation in Sudbury to plant-based products.

== Operations ==
Ault had 15 processing plants and 30 outlying distribution depots:

Some processing facilities included:

- Winchester, Ontario
- Don Mills, Ontario
- Ottawa, Ontario
- Orleans, Ontario

Main distribution centres consists of:

- Markham, Ontario
- Longueuil, Quebec
- Chilliwack, British Columbia

== Brands ==
A list of products sold by Ault:

- Astro - yogurt
- Black Diamond - cheese
- Drumstick - ice cream confection
- Häagen-Dazs - ice cream
- Sealtest milk in Canada
- Lactantia - milk, butter
- Orco

== See also ==
- Parmalat Canada
  - Beatrice Foods Canada
  - Sealtest Dairy
  - Silverwood Dairy
- Nestlé
  - Parlour
