= Sealtest Dairy =

American dairy products manufacturer

Sealtest
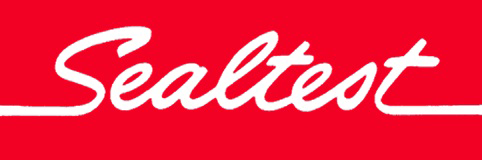
- Product type: Dairy products
- Current owner: Good Humor-Breyers (The Magnum Ice Cream Company)
- Country: United States
- Introduced: 1935; 91 years ago
- Markets: United States (Asheville, NC); Canada
- Previous owners: Kraft
- Website: Sealtest.ca

Sealtest Dairy is a Good Humor-Breyers brand for dairy products. Formerly a division of National Dairy Products Corporation (precursor to Kraft Foods) of Delaware, it produced milk, cream, ice cream, and lemonade. The Sealtest brand was also later used by various companies in Canada under license (now held by Agropur).

== History ==
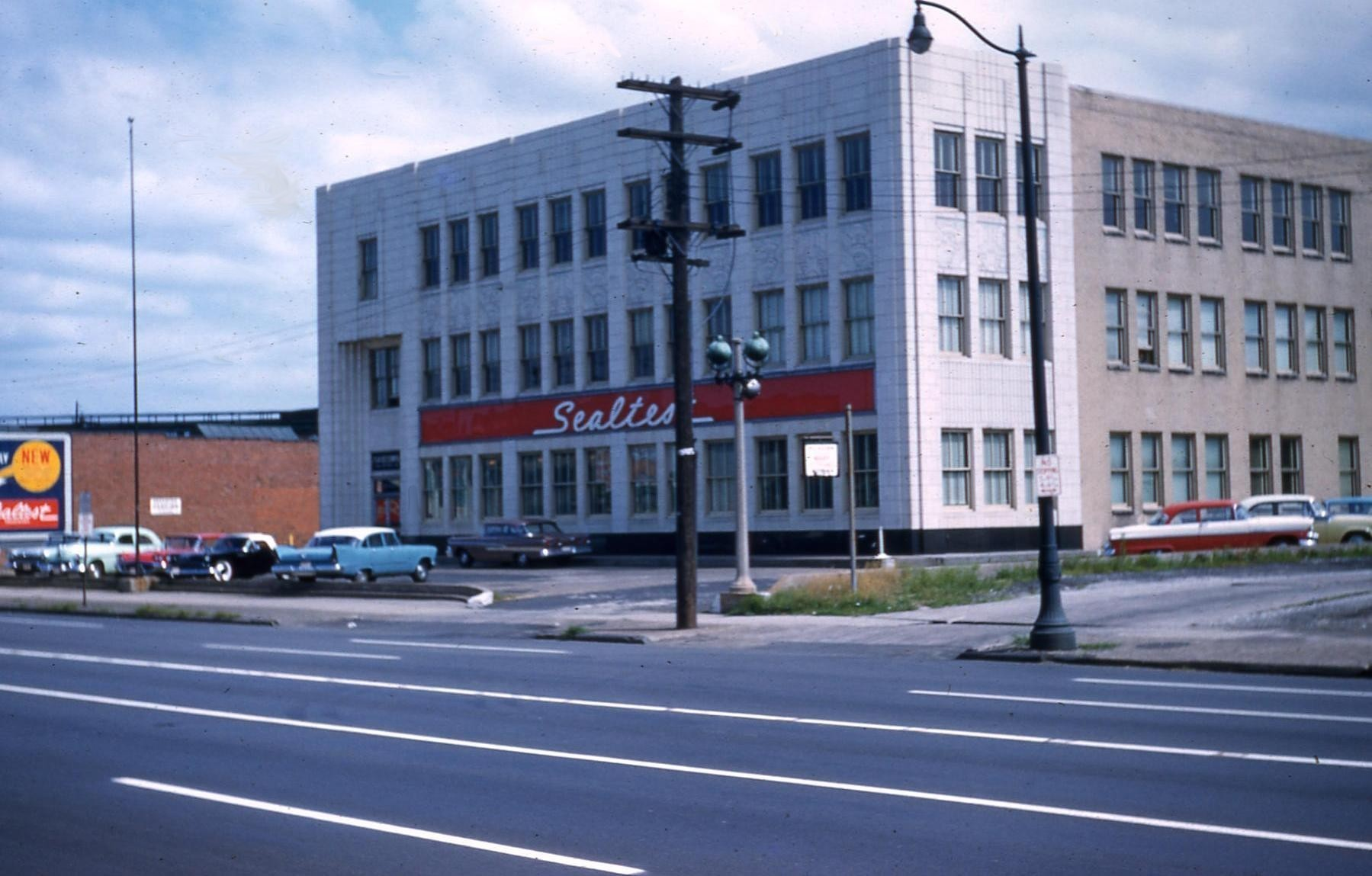
Sealtest building in Cleveland in the 1960s

Sealtest had milk and ice cream plants across the midwestern and northeastern part of the United States, with large operations in Chicago, Milwaukee, Cleveland, La Crosse, Wisconsin, Huntington, Indiana, Rockford, Illinois, Philadelphia, Pittsburgh, Baltimore, and New York City. Its Mid-South operations were based in Nashville.

The Milwaukee operation was purchased from a family-owned dairy operation, Luick Dairy, in the late 1940s or after. The Sealtest brand was originally a franchise, much like the 'Quality Chekd' dairy brand - local milk bottlers bought the rights to the Sealtest name in their market areas. Luick and presumably all the other franchisees were bought up by National Dairy Co.

Sealtest Dairy Company was founded and operated by Vernon F. Hovey. After his death, the company was turned over to his two sons. They ran the business in the state of New York, before selling the business.

Sealtest was one of the brands Martin Luther King Jr. urged people to boycott in the last speech he delivered before his assassination, "I've Been to the Mountaintop":

Go out and tell your neighbors not to buy Coca-Cola in Memphis. Go by and tell them not to buy Sealtest milk.

The Sealtest brand was ultimately acquired from Kraft (along with Breyers) in 1993 by Unilever, which retains the underlying rights to the brand. Sealtest milk products are currently produced and packaged by Milkco, Inc. of Asheville, North Carolina, a subsidiary of Ingles. The brand name is licensed from the Good Humor-Breyers subsidiary of Unilever. All Sealtest ice cream products have been discontinued.

Sealtest also sponsored an ice cream store at the Magic Kingdom at Walt Disney World in Florida named Sealtest Ice Cream Parlor and Sealtest Ice Cream Wagon.

== In Canada ==
In Canada, the Sealtest brand name arrived in 1961 when Dominion Dairies Limited came under the control of National Dairy Products (later Kraft). In 1981, Ault Foods of Toronto, Ontario, acquired Dominion Dairies, and with it the licensing rights to the Sealtest brand name. At the time, the Sealtest name was used on dairy products including milk and the Parlour brand of ice cream, primarily in Ontario and Quebec. The Sealtest plant in Toronto took over operations of Silverwood Dairy, another local dairy, in the 1980s.

Ault was broken up in 1996 and 1997, with rights to ice cream products including the Sealtest Parlour line being acquired by Nestlé, Ontario fluid milk products purchased by Agropur (and ultimately absorbed into its Natrel division, still under the Sealtest brand), and the remainder of the company (including Quebec fluid milk products, sold under the Beatrice brand) acquired by Parmalat, since 2018 Lactalis.

== See also ==
- Parmalat Canada
  - Beatrice Foods Canada
  - Ault Foods
  - Silverwood Dairy
