= Kapiti =

Kapiti or Kāpiti may refer to:

- Kapiti (New Zealand electorate), a parliamentary electorate
- Kāpiti Coast District, a local government district
- Kapiti Island
- Kapiti Coast Airport
- Kāpiti College
- Kāpiti Expressway
- Kapiti Fine Foods, a company
- Kāpiti Line, a railway line
- Kapiti Urban Area
