= BelGioioso Cheese =

Cheese manufacturer in Wisconsin, United States

BelGioioso Cheese Inc.
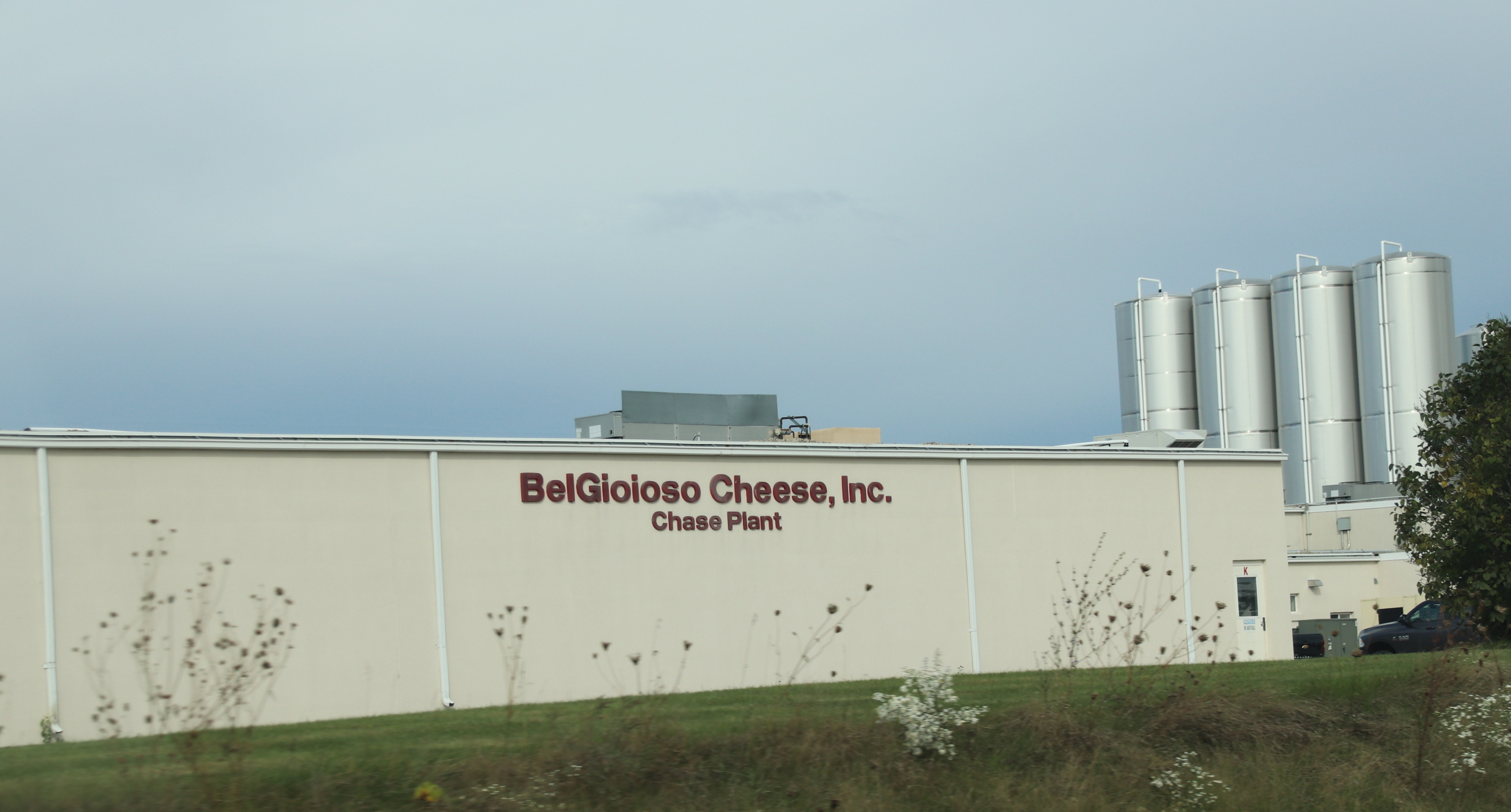
- Cheese Plant
- Type: Private
- Industry: Food processing
- Founded: 1979 (Denmark, Wisconsin), U.S.
- Headquarters: Green Bay, Wisconsin, U.S.
- Products: Cheese
- Brands: Polly-O
- Number of employees: 700+
- Website: www.belgioioso.com

BelGioioso Cheese Inc. is a cheese manufacturer in Wisconsin. The company currently operates twelve manufacturing facilities, each plant producing, aging, finishing, packaging, and shipping specific cheeses.

== History ==
BelGioioso was founded in 1979 by Errico Auricchio, whose great-grandfather had founded Auricchio in 1877, a prominent cheese manufacturer in Naples, Italy. Errico Auricchio started the company in Denmark, Wisconsin, producing provolone in a rented cheese plant in Wrightstown, Wisconsin.

In 2021, Belgioioso Cheese agreed to purchase Polly-O from Groupe Lactalis, as a requirement by the US Department of Justice's antitrust review of Lactalis's purchase from Kraft Heinz.

Today, the company produces twenty-eight varieties of cheese.
