= Dow Design =

- Type: Private
- Industry: Branding agency
- Founded: (1993)
- Headquarters: Auckland, New Zealand
- Key people: Annie Dow, Director & owner Donna McCort, Creative Director; Simon Wedde, Group Account Director
- Number of employees: 24 (2009)

Dow Design is a New Zealand brand design company based in Auckland.

Formed in 1993 by Annie Dow and the late Greg Dow, Dow Design employs a team of designers, account directors and a digital studio team, plus external brand strategy PR and IT consultants.

== Past works ==
=== Fresh’n Fruity ===
In 2009, Dow Design rebranded Fonterra Brands’ Fresh’n Fruity yoghurt range. The Fresh’n Fruity packaging features in the first book from brand packaging website www.thedieline.com, called Box Bottle Bag, published in 2010.

=== Big Wednesday ===
New Zealand Lotteries Commission appointed Dow Design in 2005 to create a brand identity for Big Wednesday, the first midweek televised lottery in New Zealand offering substantial non-cash prizes, such as luxury cars, atop a significant cash prize (minimum value of $2 million).

=== Robert Harris ===
Owned by Cerebos Gregg's, Robert Harris coffee was launched in 1972. New Zealand coffee company Robert Harris is the country’s largest fresh coffee brand., it also has the largest coffee house chain in New Zealand. Dow Design reinvigorated the Robert Harris brand in 2008 with complete coffee house refits and redesign of the coffee packaging in both the retail and food service areas . Dow Design’s packaging design for Robert Harris has been selected to appear in the 2009 Luerzer’s Archive — a publication showcasing the top 200 brand packaging concepts in the world.

=== Veda Advantage ===
Veda Advantage, formed by the sale of Baycorp Advantage’s debt collection service, employed Dow Design to create a new identity to communicate Veda’s Trans-Tasman vision. The agency used a ‘greater than’ symbol to communicate the three divisions of Veda Advantage – information, analytics and risk management.

=== Kapiti Cheese ===
The agency designed packaging for Kapiti Fine Foods Ltd Kapiti Cheese range. 'Kapiti Fine Foods Ltd', part of the Fonterra group, is a New Zealand company producing dairy products for domestic consumption and for export. After setting the tone and language for the brand- “A New Zealand Original”, Dow Design used Kapiti’s award-winning cheese Kikorangi, as a springboard to strategically leverage the growth for Kapiti’s entire premium cheese range.

=== Vogel's ===
Goodman Fielder bread brand Vogel's, was rebranded by the agency in 2007 with the packaging featuring new wood-cut style illustrations and hand-crafted typeface to reflect the brand’s authenticity. Packs were de-cluttered using warm earthy colours to highlight differences including playing up the familiar Vogel’s stripes.

=== Anchor milk ===
Dow's repack of Anchor milk in 2001 revolutionised the milk category, it introduced humor to milk, a commodity, and transformed Anchor into an imaginative brand that connected with its consumers. The brand’s future marketing and advertising was based around the pack design and cast of characters including the original Georgie the Cow and the rest of Anchorville.

== Industry awards ==
Represented at The Designers Institute of New Zealand Awards (BeST), Dow Design has also received awards at the Summit Awards, New York festivals, Australian Packaging Awards, FAB and the World Packaging Association.

== See also ==
- Brainstorming
- Design management
- Design methods
- Design thinking
