= General Ice Cream Corporation Building =

- U.S. National Register of Historic Places
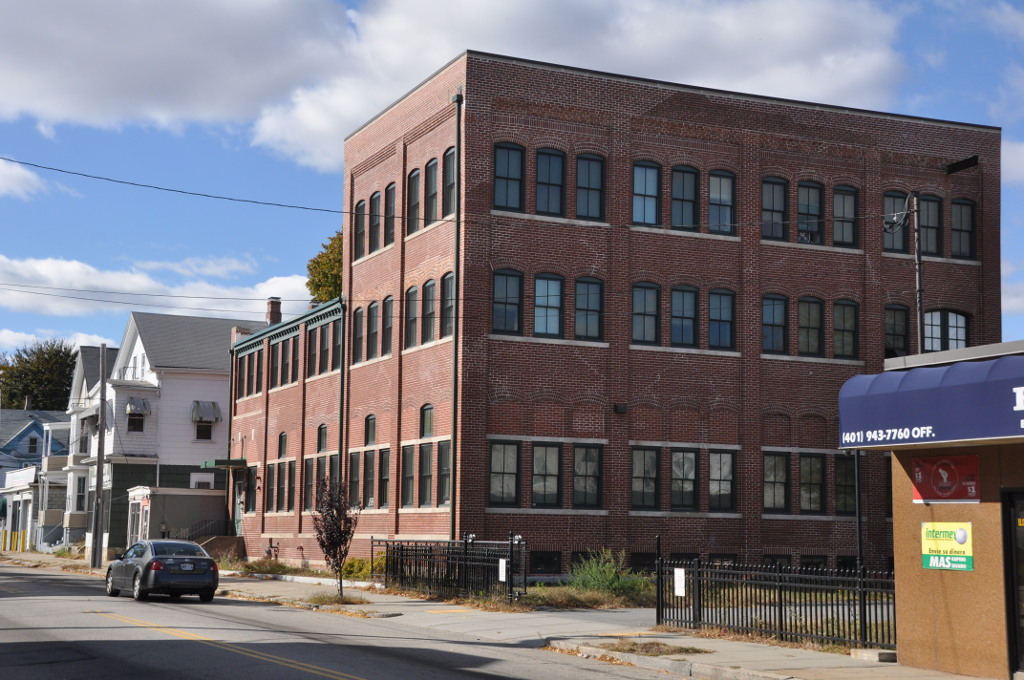

- Location within Rhode Island Location within the United States
- Location: 485 Plainfield St., Providence, Rhode Island
- Coordinates: 41°48′47″N 71°27′19″W
- Area: 0.5 acres (0.20 ha)
- Built: 1915-1918
- Architectural style: Early Commercial
- NRHP reference No.: 08000788
- Added to NRHP: August 19, 2008

The General Ice Cream Corporation Building is a historic industrial building at 485 Plainfield Street in the Silver Lake neighborhood of Providence, Rhode Island, United States. It is a brick building with two sections, one two stories and the other three. The two parts were built in separate stages between 1915 and 1918, occasioned by the rapid growth of the Dolbey Ice Cream Company, which was by 1921 the largest ice cream producer in the state. The facility was operated continuously, via a series of corporate mergers by the General Ice Cream Corporation, until 1960. The property was then used to produce Sealtest brand ice cream by the National Dairy Products Corporation (later Kraft Foods, Inc.), but was shuttered by 1967.

The building was added to the National Register of Historic Places in 2008, as a distinctive example of an early ice cream production facility.

== See also ==
- National Register of Historic Places listings in Providence, Rhode Island
