= Craig Norgate =

New Zealand businessman (1965– 2015)

Michael Craig Norgate (14 April 1965 – 7 July 2015) was a New Zealand accountant and business leader in agricultural processing, marketing and related areas. He had a career as chief executive officer (CEO) of dairy companies Kiwi Co-operative Dairies and Fonterra Co-operative Group, before consolidating the rural servicing industry through PGG Wrightson. His attempt to drive similar changes in the meat industry coincided with the 2008 financial crisis and resulted in significant losses both for PGG Wrightson and his own private equity company.

== Biography ==
Norgate was born in Hāwera in 1965. He received his tertiary education at Massey University. His work life started when he took up a management role with the Department of Maori Affairs at age 21.

Norgate had 15 years experience as a leader in the New Zealand dairy industry. He became GM of Kiwi Co-operative Dairies Ltd in 1991 and CEO at the age of 29 in 1994. In his time at the helm, Kiwi grew from a turnover of $285 million to $4.4b. In 1996 Kiwi Co-op took control of Mainland Products with a 66% share and lifted that share to 83% in a merger with Otago Co-op in 1998. Kiwi Co-op merged with New Zealand Dairy Group to form Fonterra, one of New Zealand's largest companies, in 2001 and Norgate was chosen as inaugural CEO of Fonterra for two years. He was New Zealand's first CEO on a million dollar salary. Fonterra bought the remaining 17 percent of Mainland from the McConnon family.

Norgate's two-year contract with Fonterra was not renewed in 2003 and a few weeks later in August he and the McConnon family formed Rural Portfolio Investments (RPI), with Norgate as managing director. Norgate was to receive a NZ$500,000 per annum management fee, plus expenses, for five years. In September, RPI bid for shares in Wrightson and built their stake up to 50.01 percent following a hostile takeover in 2004. Wrightson took over the number 3 player Williams & Kettle a few months later and then merged with Pyne Gould Guinness in 2005 to form PGG Wrightson, with RPI's stake at 30 percent. Norgate became deputy chairman of PGG Wrightson in 2006, shortly after it had established NZ Farming Systems Uruguay, and became chairman in 2007.

In June 2008, PGG Wrightson made an unconditional offer to buy half of Silver Fern Farms for NZ$220 million, but in September was unable to complete the equity raising required to finance the offer and defaulted. It had to pay $42 million in compensation to Silver Fern and wrote off a total of $50 million for the compensation and due diligence costs. Norgate resigned as chairman of PGG Wrightson in 2009. In 2010 Rural Portfolio Investments went into receivership.

Norgate was a director of Port Taranaki, Sealord Group, the Taranaki Rugby Union, and the CEO of the New Zealand Institute of Chartered Accountants. Among his many former governance roles, he was also the inaugural President of the NZ US Council. He graduated from Massey University and was married with three adult children; Dylan, Jordan and Alexandria.

In 2005, Norgate won The New Zealand Herald Business Leader of the Year award and in 2008 received the World Class New Zealander award for business and finance.

Norgate died in the United Kingdom on 7 July 2015. The case was referred to the coroner.
