= Black Diamond Cheese =

Canadian cheese manufacturing company

- Formerly: Belleville Cheddar Cheese Ltd.
- Industry: cheese manufacturing
- Founded: 1933; 93 years ago
- Founder: Robert F. Hart
- Headquarters: Belleville, Ontario
- Parent: Parmalat Canada (Lactalis Canada)

Black Diamond Cheese Limited is a cheese manufacturing company in Canada.

Black Diamond employs approximately 470 people at its factory in Belleville, Ontario, and its products can be found at most major retailers in Canada. The company has been owned by Parmalat Canada (Lactalis Canada) since 1998. In the United States, the brand is licensed to DCI Cheese in Wisconsin.

== History ==
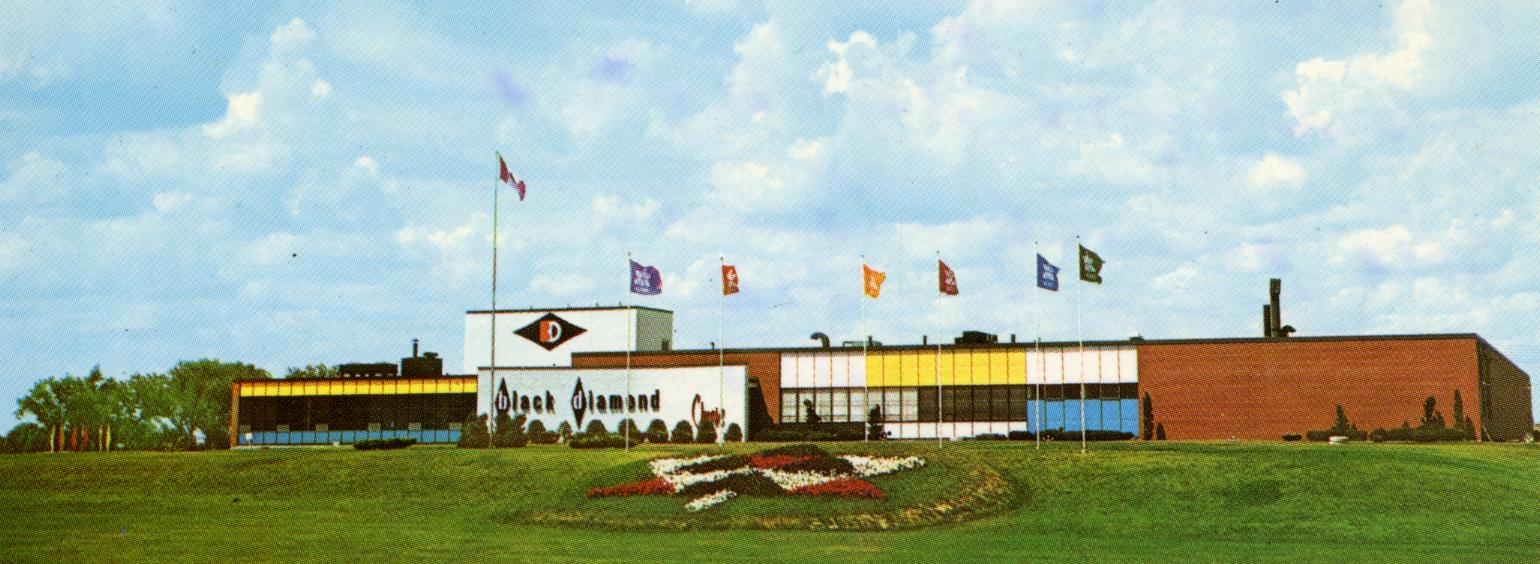
A postcard image of the Black Diamond Cheese factory in 1967. The foreground flowerbed depicts the stylized maple leaf Canadian Centennial logo

Black Diamond, initially named Belleville Cheddar Cheese Limited, was established in 1933 by Robert F. Hart, originally for the purpose of exporting aged Canadian cheddar to the British market, thus making it the first brand-name cheddar in Canada.

Black Diamond was purchased by Brooke Bond in 1968. In 1984, Brooke Bond became part of Unilever, which divested Black Diamond to Canada Packers in 1987. Canada Packers then sold the plant to major dairy Ault Foods in 1991, which after several divestments was sold to Parmalat Canada in 1997.

In 2011, Groupe Lactalis acquired Parmalat, therefore making Parmalat Canada a subsidiary of the France-based Lactalis.
