= Valvis =

Valvis is a Greek surname. Notable people with the surname include:

- Dimitrios Valvis (1814–1886), Greek politician and Prime Minister
- Jean Valvis (born 1954), Greek businessman
- Zinovios Valvis (1800–1886), Greek politician and Prime Minister
