= Parlour (ice cream) =

Frozen dessert brand

Parlour is a brand of frozen dessert currently produced by Nestlé. Parlour comes in many different flavours and is available mainly in Canada. Originally produced by Sealtest Ice Cream Parlor in the United States (and branded by Ault Foods) as an ice cream, it no longer meets the legal definition of ice cream due to a change in the recipe; the high content of palm oils (see Mellorine). Parlour now competes with bigger brands of ice cream such as: Chapman's, Breyers and others.

== List of flavours ==
- Butterscotch Sundae
- Chocolate
- Chocolate Chip
- French Vanilla
- Heavenly Hash
- Maple Walnut
- Mint Chocolate Swirl
- Neapolitan
- Spumone (discontinued)
- Strawberry
- Vanilla
- Cookies and Cream
- Nestlé Toll House (Chocolate Chip Cookie Sandwich (currently the newest flavour, consisting of French Vanilla Parlour sandwiched between two chocolate chip cookies.)
