= Geoff Lorigan =

New Zealand businessman

Geoff Lorigan CNZM
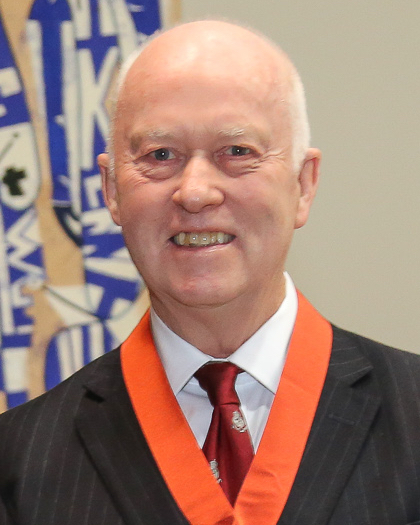
- Lorigan in 2022
- Born: Geoffrey Bevan Lorigan; 18 August 1950 (age 76); New Zealand

Geoffrey Bevan Lorigan CNZM (born 18 August 1950) is a New Zealand leadership development specialist, mentor, and businessman.

== Career ==
In 1979 Lorigan started his CEO career at Canterbury Dairy Farmers (subsequently South Island Dairy Farmers and now part of Fonterra), before moving to the United Kingdom where worked with Associated New Zealand Farmers Ltd, a New Zealand importer group.

In the 1980s Lorigan also chaired the New Zealand Lamb Promotional Council in the United Kingdom.

In 1998 Lorigan was appointed Professor of Strategy, and directed the MBA and Executive Programmes at the University of Otago. In 2001 he was appointed Professor of Strategy, Director of the MBA and Executive Programmes, and Associate Dean of the Business School at the University of Auckland. He was also an adjunct professor of Leadership at Queensland University of Technology.

Lorigan's inaugural professorial lecture at the University of Otago presented his strategic analysis of the University and was titled "Surviving success: strategic implications for the University of Otago" (1998).

He is the founder and director of the Institute for Strategic Leadership (2001) and founder and Managing Director of Smart Leader Ltd (2008).

He is a Fellow of the New Zealand Institute of Management and a Freeman of the City of London.
