= Kraft Natural Cheese =

American food processing company

Lactalis Heritage Group, Inc.
- Logo used by Lactalis Heritage Group.
- Company type: Division
- Industry: Food processing
- Predecessor: Kraft Natural Cheese
- Founded: November 29, 2021; 4 years ago
- Headquarters: Chicago, Illinois, United States
- Area served: U.S. and Canada
- Products: List of products
- Owner: Lactalis
- Parent: Lactalis America Group
- Website: kraftnaturalcheese.com

Lactalis Heritage Group, Inc., doing business as Kraft Natural Cheese, is an American food processing company resulting from the spin-off of Kraft Heinz's cheese activities in the United States and Canada and its sale to the French conglomerate Lactalis.

== History ==
In September 2020, the French conglomerate Lactalis announced that it was acquiring Kraft Heinz's natural cheese business for $3.2 billion. The acquisition includes the Kraft, Breakstone's, Knudsen, Polly-O, Athenos, and Hoffman's brands, but excludes the iconic Philadelphia brand.

== Brands ==
The new Kraft logo used since its soft-launch in April 2024 on few products

The company's core businesses are in cheese. Kraft Natural Cheese's major brands include:

- Kraft
- Cracker Barrel
- Breakstone's
- Knudsen
- Polly-O
- Athenos
- Hoffman's.

== See also ==
- List of Kraft brands
- List of dairy product companies in the United States
