= Siggi's Dairy =

American multinational skyr brand

Icelandic Milk & Skyr Corporation
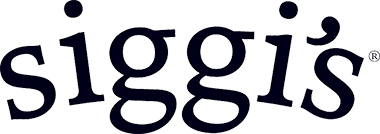
- Trade name: Siggi's dairy
- Industry: Dairy
- Founded: 2005; 21 years ago
- Founder: Siggi Hilmarsson
- Area served: Worldwide
- Products: Skyr
- Owner: Lactalis
- Parent: Lactalis America Group
- Website: siggisdairy.com

Siggi's Dairy (stylized as siggi's dairy) is an American multinational brand of skyr – an Icelandic version of yogurt – that is owned by Icelandic Milk & Skyr Corporation, a subsidiary of French dairy products leader Lactalis. The company was founded in 2005 by Icelander Siggi Hilmarsson, who sold his yogurt locally in New York, before launching in Whole Foods Market stores across the United States in 2008.

By 2015, Siggi's was the fastest-growing yogurt brand in the U.S. In 2018, French dairy company Lactalis purchased Siggi's, which continues to be run independently.

== History ==
Siggi Hilmarsson was born in Iceland around 1976. He moved to the United States in 2002 to attend Columbia Business School in New York and earn a Master of Business Administration. Siggi, who grew up on a "classic Nordic, Scandinavian diet," was surprised by the amount of sugar in US foods: "There was so much sugar in so many things, including yogurt. Some brands had the same amount of sugar as a can of soda."

In 2004, Siggi began making his own yogurt based on a 1913 recipe his mother had found at a library in Reykjavík. He wanted "less sugar and less ingredients," and also missed the thick texture of Icelandic skyr. He said that his test batches were "sometimes great, sometimes horrible." Siggi gave a test batch to Liz Thorpe, a friend who worked as vice president at Murray's Cheese in Greenwich Village: "One of her buyers got back to me and said 'If you're making this on a regular basis, we'll stock it.' That was my signal to take things from an enthusiast to a businessman." Siggi received the initial investment from his professor at Columbia, Michael van Biema, and later from friends and family. He began making yogurt experiments full-time in a test dairy plant at Morrisville State College in Upstate New York. After he prepared his first bulk order, it went on sale at Murray's Cheese. He was surprised by the yogurt's success and in 2005, he quit his job as a consultant at Deloitte.

In 2006, Siggi was selling his yogurt at a local market in New York. He also donated some of his yogurt to a Long Island retreat which consisted of artists and environmentalists, as well as an executive for Whole Foods Market. In late 2007, Siggi was contacted by Whole Foods, which expressed interest in the yogurt and its low-sugar concept, and wanted him to provide a presentation in Austin, Texas. In January 2008, his yogurt went on sale in half of all Whole Foods stores across the U.S., rather than starting in a few regions first, which was customary.

During summer 2008, rapid demand outpaced the company's production capabilities. Siggi had to cease production and shipping of the yogurt so he could raise money to purchase the necessary equipment to increase production and meet demands. According to Siggi, "We couldn't keep up with the demand, we couldn't cool the yogurt down fast enough to meet the production volumes. So, we had to shut the plant down for about three or four months and rebuild it". The company nearly went bankrupt during the plant closure. As of August 2010, Hilmarsson's company, Icelandic Milk & Skyr Corporation, had nine employees and approximately 350 cows from six family farms. By the following year, the company was producing 100,000 six-ounce cups of yogurt each week. To handle the potential of growing demand, the company began transitioning to a larger plant in 2013. Within a few years, the company had a backup manufacturing facility in Wisconsin; Siggi said, "When your business grows enough, you don't want to rely on just one plant." As of 2014, Siggi's yogurt was largely only available at Whole Foods and Target stores.

Siggi said that operating the business did not become easy until 2015, describing the previous nine years as tough. As of 2015, Siggi's was available in 8,800 stores across the U.S., and was the fastest-growing national yogurt brand of the year, with sales up 120 percent from 2014. Sales continued to rise during 2016, with availability increasing to 25,000 retail locations across the U.S., including ShopRite, Target, and Wegmans. At the end of the year, Siggi's announced a deal to place its products in 7,000 Starbucks locations.

As of 2017, Siggi's remained the fastest growing yogurt in grocery stores across the U.S., and the best-selling yogurt brand overall at Whole Foods. In 2018, French dairy company Lactalis purchased Siggi's, which continues to be run independently.

== Products ==
Siggi's contains more protein and 25 to 50 percent less sugar than other yogurt brands, and also uses approximately four times as much milk. Real fruit and cane sugar are other ingredients. The brand initially struggled due to its tart taste and minimal sugar content.

Siggi's offers flavors including vanilla, blueberry, mixed berries and açaí, and orange and ginger. The company had sold a mint and pear flavor, which was discontinued around 2009 due to supply chain issues involving the fruit. In 2014, The Atlantic favorably described Siggi's yogurt as "tangy" and sour, but noted that it was more expensive than its competitor Chobani.
