= Marie Besnier Beauvalot =

French billionaire heiress (born July 30, 1980)

- Born: July 30, 1980 (age 45)
- Parent(s): Michel Besnier; Christiane Besnier
- Relatives: André Besnier (paternal grandfather); Emmanuel Besnier (brother); Jean-Michel Besnier (brother)

Marie Besnier Beauvalot (born July 30, 1980) is a French billionaire heiress. She is a major shareholder of Lactalis.

== Biography ==
Marie Madeleine Yvonne Besnier was born in 1980 to Michel Besnier and Christiane Hallais. Her father was CEO of Lactalis, from 1955 to 2000. Her paternal grandfather, Lactalis, founded the Besnier group (later Lactalis) in 1933. She has two brothers: Emmanuel Besnier, Chairman and CEO of Lactalis, and Jean-Michel Besnier. She holds as many shares in the group as her two brothers.

Marie Besnier inherited Lactalis with her brothers in 2000. In 2023, she was one of the 3 richest women in France, with an estimated fortune of 7.2 billion euros. She has no operational function within the company, but sits on the Supervisory board. She works as a Designer.

She has been married to Stéphane Beauvalot since 2008 and lives in Laval, Mayenne.

She is also involved in a number of philanthropic initiatives, notably via the Milk for Good endowment fund, which has supported the La Source association offering art workshops for the Aide Sociale à l'Enfance, and helped set up France's first integrated pediatric oncology center with the Curie Institute (Paris).

== Early life ==
Marie Besnier Beauvalot was born in 1980. Her father, Michel Besnier, was the CEO of Lactalis from 1955 to 2000. Her paternal grandfather, André Besnier, founded the Besnier Group (later known as Lactalis) in 1933. She has two brothers: Emmanuel Besnier, who is the CEO of Lactalis, and Jean-Michel Besnier.

== Career ==
Besnier inherited 100% of Lactalis with her brothers in 2000. As of 2018, she is worth an estimated US$5.6 billion.

== Personal life ==
Besnier is married. She resides in Laval, Mayenne, France.
