= Mainland (cheese) =

New Zealand cheese brand

Mainland Cheese
- Product type: Cheddar cheese
- Current owner: Lactalis
- Country: New Zealand
- Introduced: 1954
- Markets: Worldwide
- Website: www.mainland.co.nz

Mainland Cheese is a brand of cheese owned by Lactalis that is sold throughout Australasia and parts of the Americas. It began as a family business in the South Island of New Zealand (which is jocularly known as the "mainland" of New Zealand because it is larger than the North Island).

== History ==
Mainland Products Ltd was founded in 1954 by Peter McConnon. It grew rapidly, encompassing fresh and processed milk, cheese (with which the company's name is most associated today) as well as ice cream (Tip Top), processed meats (Kiwi Huttons) and other consumer foods. Kiwi Co-operative Dairies led by CEO Craig Norgate acquired 83% of the business in the 1990s. The balance was acquired by Fonterra (formed by a 2001 merger which included Kiwi Co-op), also led by Norgate, in 2002.

In 2005, Fonterra sold most of the business that was formerly part of Mainland to Graeme Hart's Rank Group Ltd, but it retained all the cheese assets. Mainland cheese now comes under Fonterra Brands. The balance of the former Mainland company is now part of Goodman Fielder. Mainland remained a family owned and operated business, with Peter's sons Baird and Alan along with grandson Simon McConnon, until its sale to Fonterra.

On 11 November 2024, Fonterra confirmed that it would be selling several of its consumer brands including Mainland. On 22 August 2025, Fonterra confirmed it would sell its Mainland brand along with several other consumer brands and international operations to French dairy company Lactalis for NZ$3.845 billion.

== Advertising ==
Mainland established an iconic advertising campaign, winning awards for its television advertisements. Mainland's advertising in New Zealand has been largely focused on the theme of waiting or patience, mirroring the aging process of cheese, and using the phrase 'good things take time' on its logo. The 1993 'Good Things Take Time' advertising campaign is one of the longest-running campaigns in New Zealand television history and was voted by the public as one of the best ads of the 1990s.

Mainland's advertising in Australia has been largely focused on playing on the New Zealand accent. For example, "your frind in the frudge" (your friend in the fridge), and confusing the sound of "cheese day" with "Tuesday".

== See also ==
- Edam (cheese)
