= Président (brand) =

French dairy brand

- Product type: Butter
- Current owner: Lactalis
- Produced by: Lactalis
- Country: France
- Introduced: 1968; 58 years ago
- Markets: International

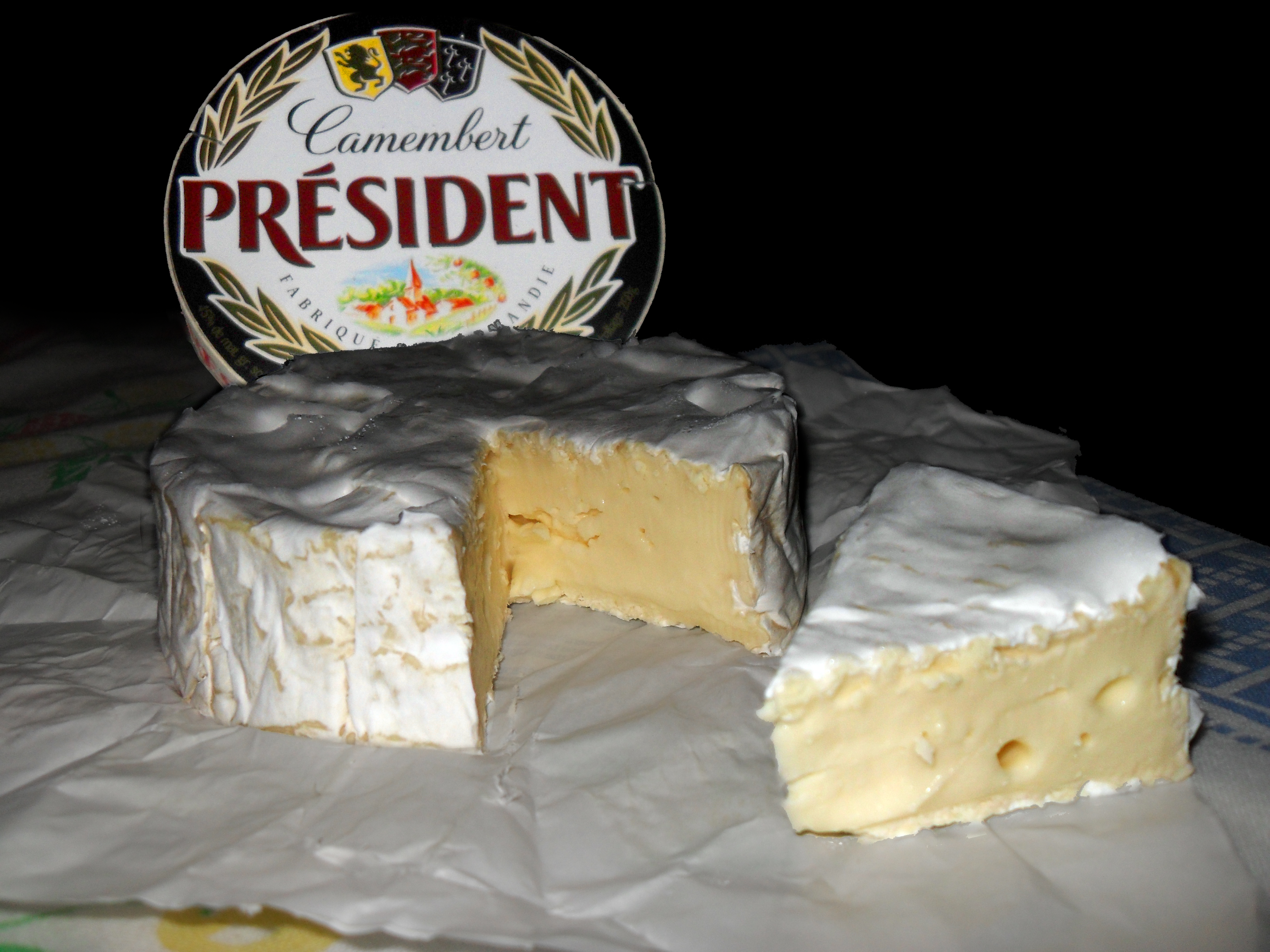
Président-branded Camembert

Président is a French dairy brand owned by Lactalis of Laval, Mayenne. The brand was created in 1933 by André Besnier. It is used for butter and for a range of industrially produced versions of traditional cheese.

== History ==
The brand was created in 1933 by André Besnier who by then was already a leading figure in the French dairy business. Explaining the name's French context, Besnier explained that "France is the land of presidents, everyone is a president: of a club of fishermen, of bowlers, of veterans". « La France est le pays des Présidents, tout le monde est président! De l'association de pêche, des boulistes, des anciens combattants. » (Presidential government had also enjoyed a higher profile in France since the return to power as president, in 1958, of leading president Charles de Gaulle.)

=== Landmark dates ===
- 1968: Launch of Président Camembert.
- 1972: Launch of Président Coulommiers.
- 1972: Launch of Président butter.
- 1975: Launch of Président Brie.
- 1991: Launch of Président Emmental range.
- 1993: Président sells its billionth Camembert.
- 1995: Launch of Président brand in Germany and United States.
- 1999: Launch of Président Camembert and Emmental based cheese spread.
- 2003: Launch of Président Mozzarella and Goats' cheese.
- 2006: Launch of Président Cantal.

== Marketing ==
The Président camembert label has barely changed since launch. Designed to mimic premium whisky labels, its crossed palms, gold-and-black palette, and heraldry signal quality and authenticity. Its three crests represent the milk's origin regions— Brittany, Normandy, and Maine stylized simply as a golden field with a lion.
