= Dukat (company) =

Croatian dairy company

Dukat d.d.
- Type: Private
- Industry: Dairy
- Predecessor: Gradska Mljekara; Gradska Mljekara Zagreb; Zagrebačka Mljekara
- Founded: 1912
- Headquarters: Zagreb, Croatia
- Revenue: €404 million (2024)
- Number of employees: 1028 (2023)
- Parent: Lactalis
- Website: dukat.hr

Dukat is a Zagreb-based Croatian company that produces dairy products.

== History ==
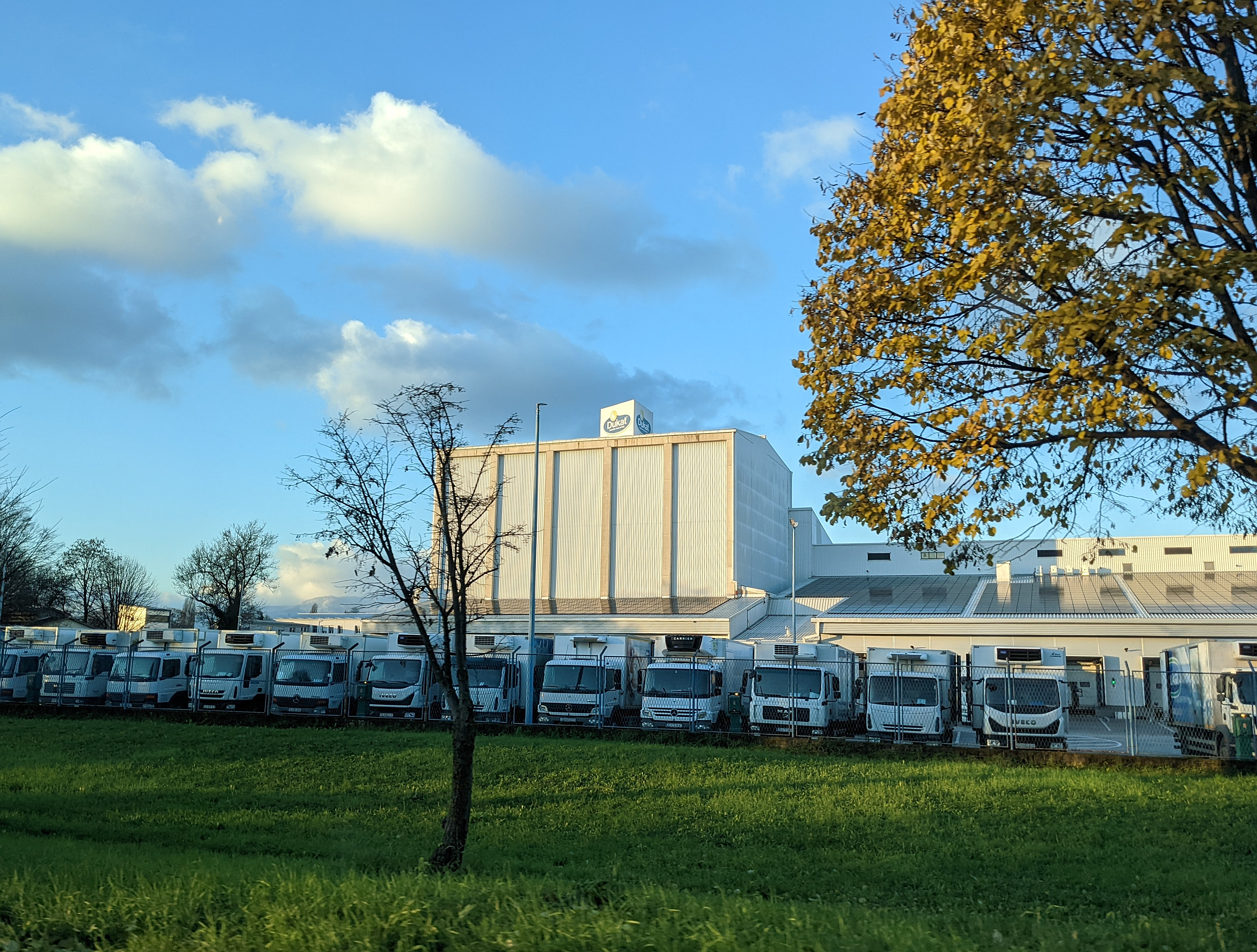
Factory in Zagreb

It was founded in 1912 as Gradska mljekara (eng. city dairy company) in today's Radić street in Zagreb, in what was then Kingdom of Croatia-Slavonia within Austria-Hungary. This was followed by the founding of other dairy companies in the city, Baltic (1924) and Samopomoć (1926), all of which were eventually merged into a single company called 'Gradska Mljekara Zagreb' (1948). It was finally renamed to Dukat in 1972. Its products including milk, yoghurt, pudding, cream, mousse, butter, spreads and dip, as well as low-calorie and lactose-free variants. It cooperates with about 2,000 small, medium and large milk producers throughout Croatia.

Since 2007, it is a part of the Lactalis Group, serving as its main hub for Southeast Europe. In 2013, it took over Ljubljanske mlekarne (Ljubljana dairy company). In the following decade, it invested in modernising or building its production lines to secure the leading position in the region. From 2014, it began exporting its products to Africa, South America and China. During 2020, the company and its subsidiaries consisted of 13 companies from Bosnia and Herzegovina, Slovenia, Kosovo, North Macedonia and Bulgaria, employing 3,000 workers, including 1,000 in Croatia itself. Its products today are exported to 86 countries.
