= Jean-Michel Besnier =

French businessperson, billionaire (born 1967/1968)(Lactalis Group)

- Born: 1967 or 1968 (age 58–59)
- Parent(s): Michel Besnier; Christiane Besnier
- Relatives: André Besnier (paternal grandfather); Emmanuel Besnier (brother); Marie Besnier Beauvalot (sister)

Jean-Michel Besnier (born 1967/1968) is a French billionaire heir. He is a major shareholder of Lactalis.

== Early life ==
Jean-Michel Besnier was born circa 1968. His father, Michel Besnier, was the CEO of Lactalis from 1955 to 2000. His paternal grandfather, André Besnier, founded the Besnier Group (later known as Lactalis) in 1933. He has a brother, Emmanuel Besnier, who is the CEO of Lactalis, and a sister, Marie.

== Career ==
Besnier inherited 100% of Lactalis with his brother and sister.

== Wealth ==
His net worth was estimated by Forbes at US$6.6 billion (July 2021).

== Personal life ==
He resides in Laval, Mayenne, France.
