= Michel Besnier =

French businessman (1928–2000)

- Born: 18 September 1928; Laval, Mayenne
- Died: 11 June 2000 (aged 71); Marbella, Spain
- Spouse: Christiane Besnier
- Children: Emmanuel Besnier; Jean-Michel Besnier; Marie Besnier Beauvalot
- Parent: André Besnier

Michel Besnier (1928–2000) was a French heir and businessman. He served as the chief executive officer of the Besnier Group, later known as Lactalis.

== Early life ==
Michel Besnier was born on 18 September 1928 in Laval, Mayenne. His father, André Besnier, founded the Besnier Group, a cheese company, in 1933. He received a Certificat d'études primaires.

== Career ==
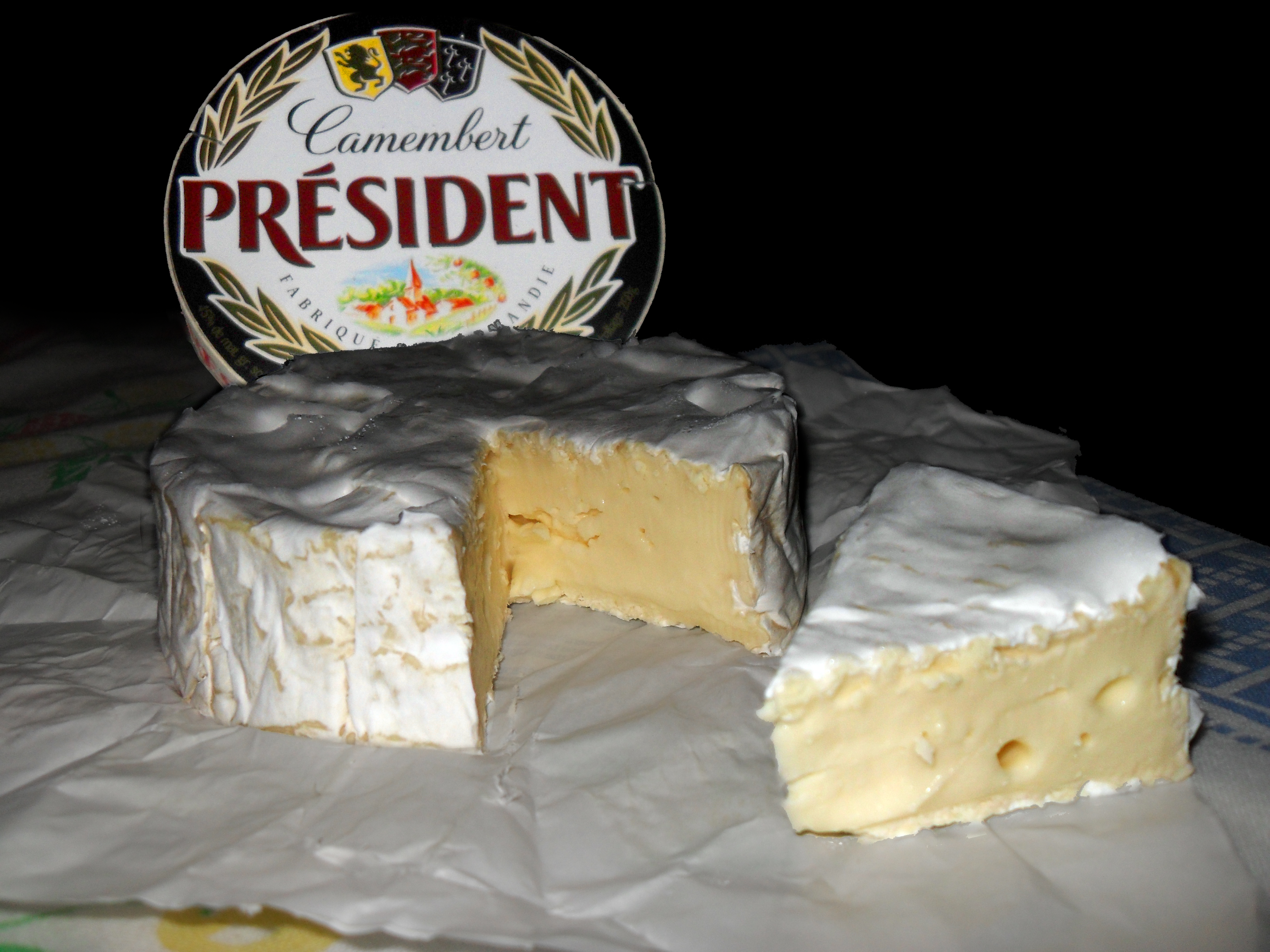
Président camembert.

Besnier started his career at the family business alongside his father in 1946. After his father died in 1955, he became its chief executive officer.

He launched Président, the brand of camembert, in 1968. He also acquired Lepetit, Lanquetot, Bridel, Lactel and Roquefort Société. His success lay in his ability to predict the vast expansion of supermarkets.

He changed the company name to Lactalis in 1999.

== Personal life ==
He married Christiane Besnier. They had two sons, Emmanuel and Jean-Michel, and a daughter, Marie. They owned a house in Marbella, Spain.

== Death ==
He died on 11 June 2000 at his Marbella home. He was seventy-one years old.
