= Jean Valvis =

Swiss-Greek businessman

Jean Valvis (born July 16, 1954, in Athens, Greece) is a businessman of Swiss and Greek citizenship. His name is related to two important multinational transactions: the sale of Dorna Apemin S.A. to Coca-Cola Hellenic Bottling Company and The Coca-Cola Company in 2002, and the sale of Dorna Lactate to Lactalis Group in 2008.

In 2006, he invested in SC Viti-Pomicola Sâmburești and in 2009 he launched a range of wines under the following brands: Château Valvis, Domeniile Sâmburești and Sâmburel de Olt.
