= Western Star (butter) =

Australian butter and spreads brand

- Industry: Retail
- Founded: 1926
- Headquarters: Melbourne, Victoria, Australia
- Website: Official website

Western Star is an Australian butter and spreads brand founded in 1926 in the Western Districts of Victoria. Products are widely distributed across Australia and available in most supermarkets. The brand is owned by Fonterra.

On 11 November 2024, Fonterra confirmed that it would be selling several of its consumer brands including Western Star. In August 2025, Fonterra agreed to sell its global consumer and associated businesses, including Western Star, to French dairy group Lactalis for about $3.4 billion, a deal that will make Lactalis the largest dairy company in Australia once completed.

== See also ==
- List of brand name condiments
