= Lactalis-Nestlé Fresh Products =

Dairy company

Lactalis-Nestlé Produits Frais is a company specializing in the production of dairy products, sold under various brands of Nestlé, Lactalis, and private labels.

It brings together the Swiss agri-food companies Nestlé and the French Lactalis, respectively the world's top two dairy product companies, within a joint venture.

== History ==
Lactalis Nestlé Produits Frais was formed in 2006 through the incorporation of Nestlé Produits Frais activities in Europe into the Lactalis Group through a majority-owned joint venture by Lactalis.

The company generated approximately 1.5 billion euros in revenue in Europe in 2018.

== Locations ==
Lactalis-Nestlé Produits Frais has factories in Vallet, Lisieux, Montayral, Saint-Martin-des-Entrées (Bayeux), Laval, Cuincy, Andrézieux, Guadalajara, and Aberystwyth.
