= Henry van der Heyden =

New Zealand business executive (born 1957)

Sir Henry van der Heyden KNZM
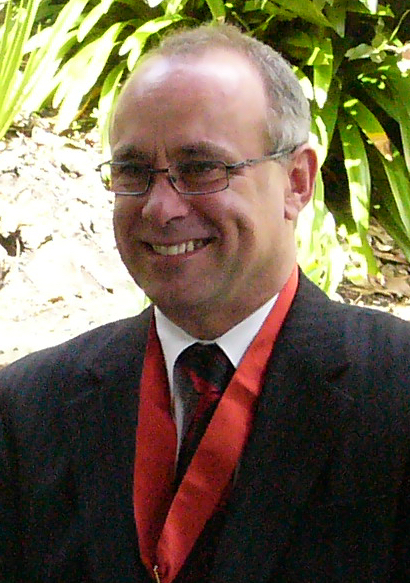
- Van der Heyden in 2007
- Born: Henricus Wilhelmus van der Heyden; 1957 (age 67–68)
- Occupations: Dairy farmer; Business executive; Company director

Sir Henricus Wilhelmus van der Heyden KNZM (born 1957) is a New Zealand dairy farmer, business executive and company director. He was chair of Fonterra from 2002 to 2012.

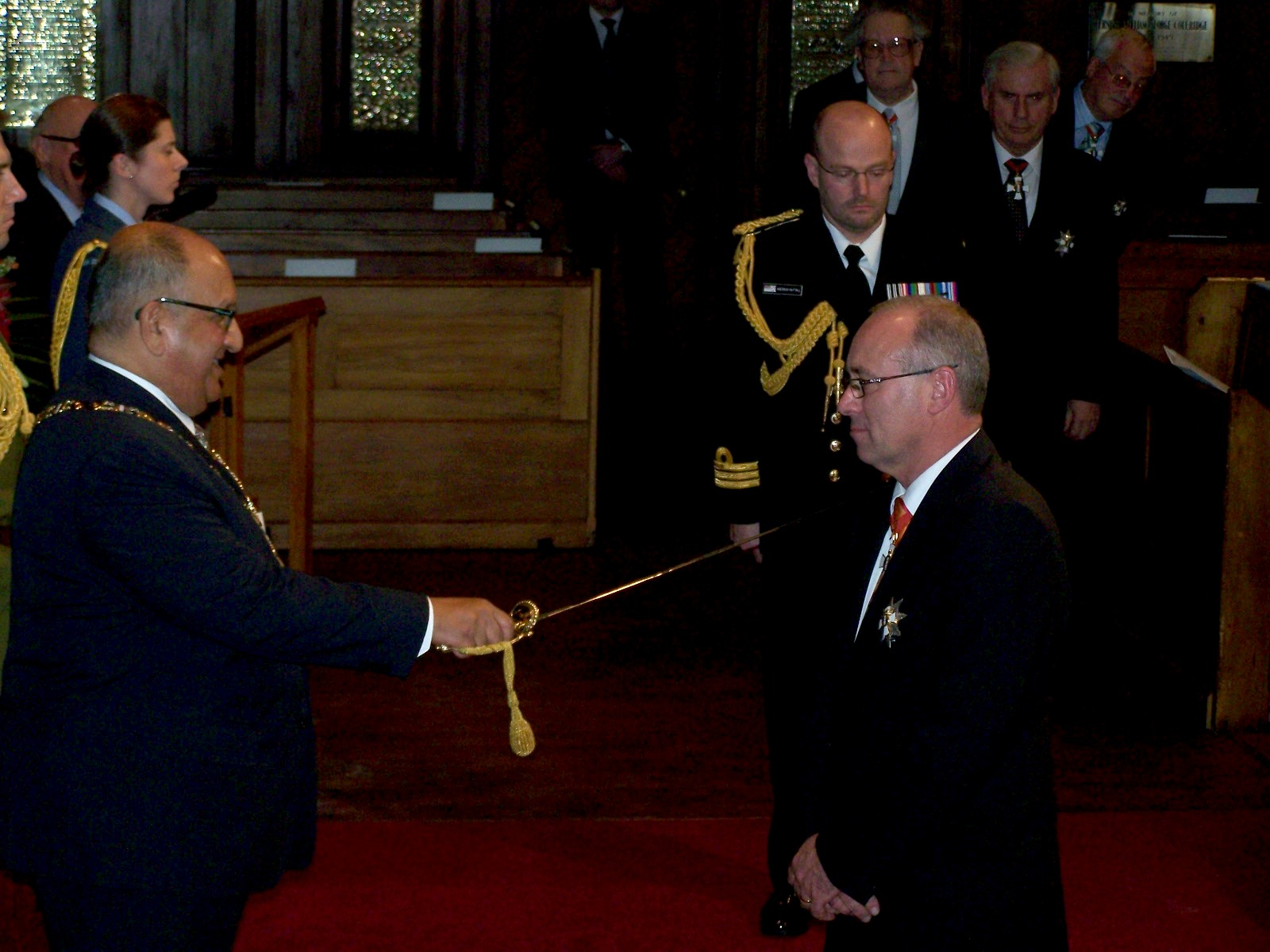
Van der Heyden's investiture as a Knight Companion of the New Zealand Order of Merit by the governor-general, Sir Anand Satyanand, at Old St Paul's, Wellington, on 19 August 2009

In the 2007 Queen's Birthday Honours, van der Heyden was appointed a Distinguished Companion of the New Zealand Order of Merit, for services to agriculture. In 2009, following the restoration of titular honours by the New Zealand government, he accepted redesignation as a Knight Companion of the New Zealand Order of Merit. In 2011, he was conferred with an honorary Doctor of Commerce degree by Lincoln University.
