= The Protein Works =

British functional food company

Protein Works
- Industry: Sports nutrition Active lifestyle food sector
- Founded: 2012
- Founders: Mark Coxhead, Karl Jacobie, Nick Smith
- Headquarters: Liverpool, England
- Area served: Worldwide
- Key people: Mark Coxhead, Laura Keir.
- Products: Food Supplements
- Revenue: ▲£55.1 million (2025)
- Number of employees: 165 employees
- Website: Website

Protein Works, previously known as The Protein Works is a British functional food brand that makes protein shakes, meal replacements, complete meals, snacks and supplements.

The company is headquartered in Liverpool, United Kingdom, and primarily operates online, selling directly to consumers through its e-commerce platform.

== History ==
=== 2010s ===
Protein Works was founded in 2012 by Mark Coxhead, Karl Jacobie, and Nick Smith.

In the 2013/2014 season, Protein Works became the official sports nutrition supplier to Everton FC.

In 2014, Protein Works was named New Business of the Year at the 2014 National Business Awards in London.

In 2015, Protein Works was sold to Walgreens Boots Alliance. In 2018, Walgreens Boots Alliance began the process of selling Protein Works. In 2019, the YFM Equity Partners backed the management buyout of Protein Works from B&B Investment Partners.

=== 2020s ===
In 2021, Protein Works launched a sister brand, Abnormal.io, offering a subscription box service that delivers personalised complete meal shakes to your door. Each meal contains the ideal amount of protein, fats and carbs.

In 2023, Protein Works were recognised at the Growing Business Awards winning in the Santander Growing Business of the Year: Turnover £25m-45m category. In the same year, Protein Works reported a turnover of £42.8m for the 12 months to August 31, 2023, up from £30.7m.

In 2024, Laura Keir, CEO, was recognised as one of LDC's top 50 most ambitious leaders for 2024. 2024 SME News named Protein Works as the Best Functional Food Brands. The British Private Equity & Venture Capital Association (BCVA) recognised Protein Works as "Leaders Driving Growth".

Also in 2024, Protein Works announced its move to a new £10m vertically integrated headquarters, dubbed "PW Campus", in Liverpool City Region.

In 2025, Protein Works announced that it had achieved annual sales revenue of £50 million.
