= Emmanuel Besnier =

French heir and businessman (born 1970)

- Born: Emmanuel Georges Philippe Besnier; 18 September 1970 (age 55); Laval, Mayenne, France
- Education: Lycée de l'Immaculée-Conception; ISG Business School
- Occupations: CEO, Lactalis
- Spouse: Sandrine Hunaut
- Children: 3
- Parent(s): Michel Besnier; Christiane Hallais
- Relatives: André Besnier (grandfather); Jean-Michel Besnier (brother); Marie Besnier Beauvalot (sister)

Emmanuel Georges Philippe Besnier (French pronunciation: [emanɥɛl bɛnje]; born 18 September 1970) is a French heir and billionaire businessman. He is the chief executive officer (CEO) and controlling shareholder of Lactalis. As of February 2025, Forbes estimated his net worth at US$24.2 billion.

== Early life ==
Emmanuel Besnier was born on 18 September 1970 in Laval, Mayenne, France. His father was Michel Besnier and his mother, Christiane. His paternal grandfather, André Besnier, was the founder of Lactalis in 1933. He has a brother, Jean-Michel, and a sister, Marie.

He was educated at the Lycée de l'Immaculée-Conception, a Roman Catholic private lycée in Laval. He graduated from the ISG Business School in Paris.

== Career ==
Besnier joined Lactalis as director of development in 1995. He took over as the CEO in 2000, when his father died.

With his brother and sister, he owned 83% of Lactalis. He shuns publicity and has been nicknamed "the invisible billionaire".

== Lactalis salmonella scandal ==
At the end of 2017, Lactalis had to recall 12 million salmonella-contaminated boxes of baby milk from 83 countries. Besnier was summoned by Bruno Lemaire to the French finance ministry.

== Philanthropy ==
He donates Euro 200,000 annually to the Francis-Le-Basser football stadium in Laval. He also attends their board meetings. He built a private box with tinted glass, from which he watches football matches.

In 2006, he was the recipient of the "Mayennais of the Year" award from the local Rotary Club.

== Personal life ==
He married Sandrine, a native of Laval whom he met in high school, at the Basilique Notre Dame in Laval. They have three children. They reside in the 7th arrondissement of Paris. They also live in a château in Entrammes near Laval that he inherited from his father.
