= Natrel =

Canadian dairy co-operative

- Company type: Subsidiary
- Industry: Dairy products distribution
- Founded: 1990
- Headquarters: 4600, Armand-Frappier street Saint-Hubert, Quebec J3Z 1G5
- Products: Milk, Butter, Cream, Sour cream, Cottage cheese, Ice cream, Cheese, Dips and Spread
- Parent: Agropur
- Website: www.natrel.ca

Natrel is a Canadian dairy co-operative based in Montreal, Quebec. The brand specializes in milk without antibiotics or artificial growth hormones and distributes the product throughout Canada.

== History ==
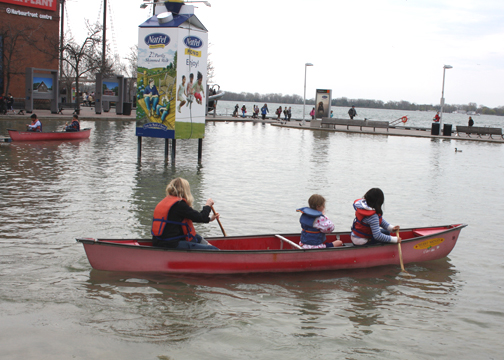
An advertisement for Natrel shaped as a milk carton

Natrel was formed in 1990 as the dairy subsidiary of the Agropur agricultural cooperative, headquartered in Longueuil, Quebec.

In 2012 the company began producing shelf-stable milk in collaboration with Tetra Pak. The first product released in the line was Baboo, a shelf-stable drink aimed towards toddlers. Baboo received criticism for what some people perceived to be an unnecessary product while the company argued that its formulation of milk protein made the drink easily digestible for young children.

In 2015 the company opened a "Milk Bar" cafe in Montreal in collaboration with coffee company Java U. The company opened a second Milk Bar in Toronto in 2016.

== Operations ==
As with other Canadian dairy companies, Natrel's butter production peaks in the spring.

=== Locations ===
- Markham, Ontario
- Longueuil, Quebec
- Quebec City, Quebec
- Amqui, Quebec
- Saint-Bruno-de-Montarville, Quebec
- Sudbury, Ontario
- Ottawa, Ontario
- Chilliwack, British Columbia
- Victoria, British Columbia - Island Dairy
- Delta, British Columbia - Island Dairy
