= Polly-O =

American cheese brand

- Product type: Cheese products
- Current owner: BelGioioso Cheese
- Country: United States
- Introduced: 1899; 127 years ago
- Markets: Worldwide
- Previous owners: Giuseppe Pollio; Kraft Foods Inc. Kraft Heinz
- Website: polly-ofoodservice.com

Polly-O is an American brand of cheese products, currently owned by BelGioioso Cheese Inc. The original Polly-O manufacturing company had been established in 1899, operating independently until it was acquired by Kraft Foods Inc. in 1986. Kraft owned it until 2020, when it sold its natural cheese division to Groupe Lactalis.

In 2021, Groupe Lactalis entered into a purchase agreement to sell Polly-O to BelGioioso Cheese, to comply with a US Department of Justice's antitrust review of Lactalis's purchase from Kraft Heinz.

== Overview ==
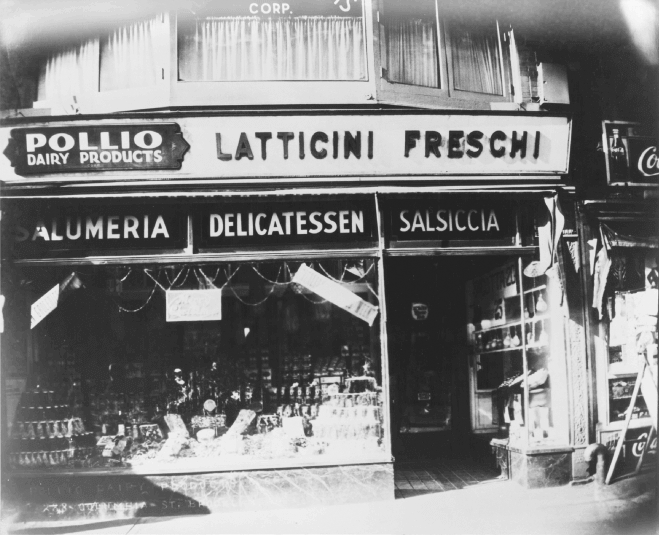
Pollio Latticini Store, Brooklyn, New York, 1899

Polly-O was started by Giuseppe Pollio in Brooklyn in 1899 and bought by Kraft Foods in 1986. Pollio brought his family's traditional cheese-making Italian traditions to America with him. About 100 years ago when Pollio first came to America, he went to Coney Island in Brooklyn, New York and set up his ricotta and mozzarella kettles on the beach after coming through Ellis Island. The Pollio company changed its name to Polly-O in the 1940s due to the original name's similarity to the polio epidemic.

Polly-O cheese is sold in many US grocery chain stores and is well known for its ricotta, mozzarella, and string cheeses. Most Polly-O cheese is manufactured in Campbell, New York. Polly-O is one of the largest producers of Italian cheeses. This company produces almost one hundred million pounds of cheese each year. Huffington Post has called the company's string cheese line "a work of art".
