= Agropur =

Canadian dairy cooperative

- Type: Agricultural cooperative
- Industry: Dairy products
- Founded: Granby, Quebec, Canada (August 24, 1938)
- Founder: L.-A. Mondou, Omer Deslauriers and 86 dairy producers from the Granby area
- Headquarters: Saint-Hubert, Quebec, Canada
- Key people: Émile Cordeau (CEO), Roger Massicotte (President) (Former), Serge Riendeau (President)
- Products: Milk; Cheese; Butter; Cream; Ice cream Ingredients
- Production output: 6.7 billion litres of milk
- Revenue: ▲ C$7.3 billion (2021)
- Members: 2,908
- Number of employees: 7,500
- Website: www.agropur.com/en

Agropur Cooperative is a Canadian dairy agricultural cooperative founded on August 24, 1938, in Granby, Quebec by L.-A. Mondou, Omer Deslauriers, and 86 local dairy producers. Currently headquartered in Saint-Hubert, Quebec, Agropur operates brands such as Natrel, Oka cheese, and Québon in the industrial, retail, and food service sectors. As of 2021, the cooperative has 2,908 members and a workforce of around 7,500 employees. It generated revenues of C$7.3 billion in 2021.

== History ==
In 1971, the Quebec-based Coopérative Agricole de Granby (renamed Agropur in 1979) obtained the Canadian licence to manufacture and market Yoplait products. In 1993, Agropur's yogurt manufacturing and marketing operations were combined with those of Agrifoods, a federal cooperative owned by 2,500 dairy producers in Alberta, British Columbia, and Saskatchewan, forming Ultima Foods.

In December 2020, Agropur announced the sale of its yogurt activities in Canada to Lactalis, a French-based company.

In 2022, Agropur made a significant $34 million investment in its ice cream and frozen novelties plant novelties in Truro, Nova Scotia, Canada.

In November of 2025, Agropur announced the closure of its Edmonton Ice Cream plant, located in Edmonton, Alberta, Canada after 60 years of operation laying off 137 workers. The plant was founded by Safeway and purchased by Agropur upon the sale of Safeway to Sobeys in 2014.

== Acquisitions ==
In January 2017, Agropur acquired the Nova Scotia-based company Scotsburn, expanding its offering of ice cream and novelty products. At the time of the acquisition, Scotsburn had annual sales of more than $150 million.
