= Kapiti Fine Foods =

Manufacturer of dairy products

Kapiti Fine Foods Ltd
- Type: Division
- Industry: Dairy foods
- Founded: 1984
- Headquarters: New Zealand
- Products: Cheese, ice cream, yoghurt
- Revenue: NZ$60 million
- Owner: Lactalis
- Number of employees: 230
- Website: https://www.tastekapiti.co.nz/

Kapiti Fine Foods Ltd (stylised as Kāpiti) is a New Zealand dairy brand making products such as cheeses and ice cream. It takes its name from its original site at Lindale on the Kāpiti Coast. It was founded in 1984 and has factories in Palmerston North. It has been owned by Fonterra since 2005 and was sold to the French dairy conglomerate Lactalis in 2025.

== History ==
Kapiti was founded in 1984 by Ross McCallum and Neville McNaughton as a small cheese shop and factory at Lindale Tourist Complex on the Kāpiti Coast. The shop and factory initially employed only one full-time employee, with help from a number of part-time employees. By 2002 the company had 150 employees and retail outlets in Auckland, Christchurch and Lindale, assisted by an expansion of production facilities in 1997, and consistent annual growth. On 15 November 2005, Fonterra agreed to purchase Kapiti Fine Foods Ltd from its previous owner, Foodstuffs. In 2019, Kapiti ice cream was licensed to Froneri as part of Fonterra's sale of the Tip Top ice cream brand.

In 2019, the company announced that it was closing its factory in Paraparaumu.

On 11 November 2024, Fonterra confirmed that it would be selling several of its consumer brands including Kāpiti. Kapiti was sold to the French conglomerate Lactalis in 2025.

== Products ==
Kapiti produces a variety of dairy products. In 1997, production of a range of ice cream and sorbet products began, intended for use in the hospitality and food service industries. In 2009, the company launched a range of ice cream products for the consumer market.

In 2010, Kapiti launched a range of yoghurt products for the consumer market.
