= Fonterra =

New Zealand multinational dairy co-operative

Fonterra Co-operative Group Limited
- Type: Publicly listed cooperative
- Traded as: Shareholders' Market: NZX: FCG (shares); NZX: FCGHA (notes); Shareholders' Fund: NZX: FSF; ASX: FSF; NZX 50 Index component
- Industry: Manufacturing, retail
- Predecessors: New Zealand Dairy Group; Kiwi Co-operative Dairies
- Founded: 16 October 2001; 25 years ago
- Headquarters: Auckland, New Zealand
- Area served: Worldwide
- Key people: Richard Allen, (CEO)
- Products: Milk, butter, cheese, yoghurt
- Brands: Anchor; Anmum; Anlene; Mainland Cheese; Nutiani
- Revenue: ▲NZ$22.82 billion (2024)
- Operating income: ▼NZ$1.56 billion (2024)
- Net income: ▼NZ$1.17 billion (2024)
- Total assets: ▼NZ$16.68 billion (2024)
- Total equity: ▲NZ$8.18 billion (2024) (Revenue and Operating income is from continuing operations)
- Number of employees: 16,441(2024)
- Website: www.fonterra.com

Fonterra Co-operative Group Limited is a New Zealand multinational publicly traded dairy co-operative owned by New Zealand farmers. The company is responsible for approximately 30% of the world's dairy exports and has revenue exceeding NZ $22 billion, making it New Zealand's largest company. It is the sixth-largest dairy company in the world as of 2022, as well as the largest in the Southern Hemisphere.

Fonterra was established in October 2001 following the merger of the country's two largest dairy co-operatives, New Zealand Dairy Group (NZDG) and Kiwi Cooperative Dairies, with the New Zealand Dairy Board. The name Fonterra comes from Latin fons terrae, meaning "spring from the land".

== History ==
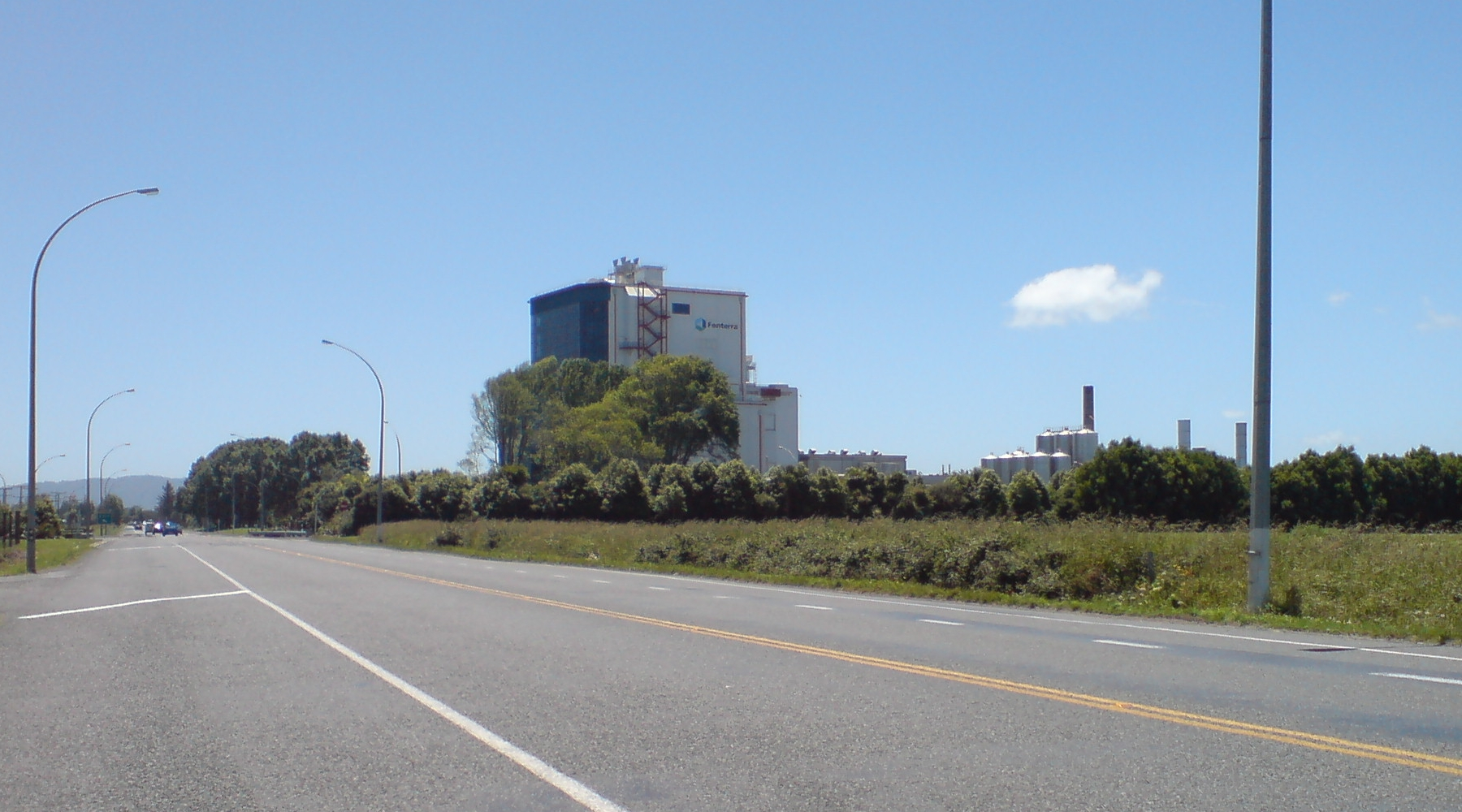
Te Rapa dairy factory north of Hamilton

=== Background ===
The first dairy co-operative in New Zealand was established in Otago in 1871. By 1920, there were 600 dairy processing factories of which about 85% were owned by co-operatives. In the 1930s there were around 500 co-operatives but after World War II, improved transportation, processing technologies and energy systems led to a trend of consolidation, where the co-operatives merged and became larger and fewer in number. By the end of the 1990s, there were only four co-operatives nationwide: the Waikato-based New Zealand Dairy Group, the Taranaki-based Kiwi Co-operative Dairies, Westland Milk Products, and Tatua Co-operative Dairy Company.

=== Formation ===
Fonterra was formed in 2001 from the merger of the two largest co-operatives, New Zealand Dairy Group and Kiwi Co-operative Dairies, together with the New Zealand Dairy Board, which had been the marketing and export agent for all the co-operatives. Fonterra effectively has monopsony control of the New Zealand domestic and export dairy industry. The merger was initially turned down by the New Zealand Commerce Commission, but later approved by the New Zealand Government, with subsequent legislation deregulating the dairy industry, allowing for the export of dairy products to be undertaken by any company. The two smaller co-operatives, Tatua and Westland (which would later be acquired by Yili Group in 2019), did not join Fonterra, instead remaining independent.

The company has an annual revenue of around NZ$22 billion. Its core business consists of exporting dairy products under the NZMP brand (95% of its New Zealand production is exported). It also operates a fast-moving consumer goods business for dairy products, Fonterra Brands. Fonterra has a number of subsidiaries and joint-venture companies operating in markets around the world.

=== International expansion ===
In 2005, the company purchased a large factory in Dennington, Victoria, Australia, from Nestlé, after it moved out of the collection of milk from farmers and the manufacture of powdered milk in Australia. Also in 2005 the company made moves towards purchasing Australian companies Dairy Farmers and National Foods. It also converted its 50 per cent stake in Victoria dairy producer Bonlac to full ownership. At this time $1 billion of Fonterra's revenue was from Australian sales, which was 14 per cent of the dairy products it sells around the world.

In June 2008, the company acquired the yoghurt and dairy dessert business of Nestlé Australia, which it on-sold to Parmalat Australia in December 2015.

In 2010, leaked US embassy cables suggested New Zealand had only sent troops to Iraq in 2003, following the initial invasion, so Fonterra would keep valuable Oil for Food contracts. New Zealand was not a member of the coalition which supported invasion of the country, but later sent combat engineers for mine clearance and other such tasks.

In 2025, Lactalis agreed to buy the consumer unit of New Zealand’s Fonterra Co-operative Group for an amount of NZ$3.85 billion. This deal would include Fonterra’s consumer brands such as Anchor, Mainland, and Anlene in the Asia Pacific.

=== Asset sales and divestment ===
In 2019, the Tip Top ice cream brand was sold for NZ$380 million to Froneri, a global joint venture between Nestlé and PAI Partners.

In September 2019, Fonterra agreed to sell its 50% stake in DFE Pharma for NZ$633 million ($400.37 million).

In late February 2022, Fonterra suspended exports to Russia in protest of the 2022 Russian invasion of Ukraine. The company had exported NZ$240 million worth of produce to Russia in 2021. On 21 March, Fonterra closed its office in Moscow and withdrew from its joint venture with Russian company Unifood.

In mid May 2024, Fonterra announced plans to sell its global consumer business as part of a shift towards becoming a global business-to-business supplier of dairy nutrition products. The company's consumer business brands included Anchor, Mainland, Kapiti, Anlene, Anmum, Fernleaf, Western Star, and Perfect Italiano; which comprise 15% of the co-op's total milk solids. Other brands affected by the proposed divestment include its subsidiaries Fonterra Oceania and Fonterra Sri Lanka. In addition, the divestment could affect Fonterra's 17 manufacturing sites including three facilities in New Zealand.

On 11 November, Fonterra confirmed that it would be selling its consumer brands including Anchor, Mainland, Kāpiti, Anlene, Anmum, Fernleaf, Western Star and Perfect Italiano. The company also confirmed that it would sell its subsidiaries Fonterra Oceania and Fonterra Sri Lanka, as well as its 17 manufacturing sites including its three New Zealand facilities.

On 29 April 2025, Fonterra confirmed plans to close its Hamilton canning and packing facility in July 2025, affecting 120 jobs.

In August 2025, Fonterra agreed to divest its consumer business operations, that include brands such as Anchor, Mainland, and Anlene, to Lactalis for NZ$3.85 billion. In mid-October 2025, New Zealand First leader and Foreign Minister Winston Peters issued an open letter to Fonterra shareholders, urging farmers to vote against selling Fonterra's brands to Lactalis for short-term profits on the grounds that it would tarnish these brands' reputations.

== Fonterra Research and Development Centre ==
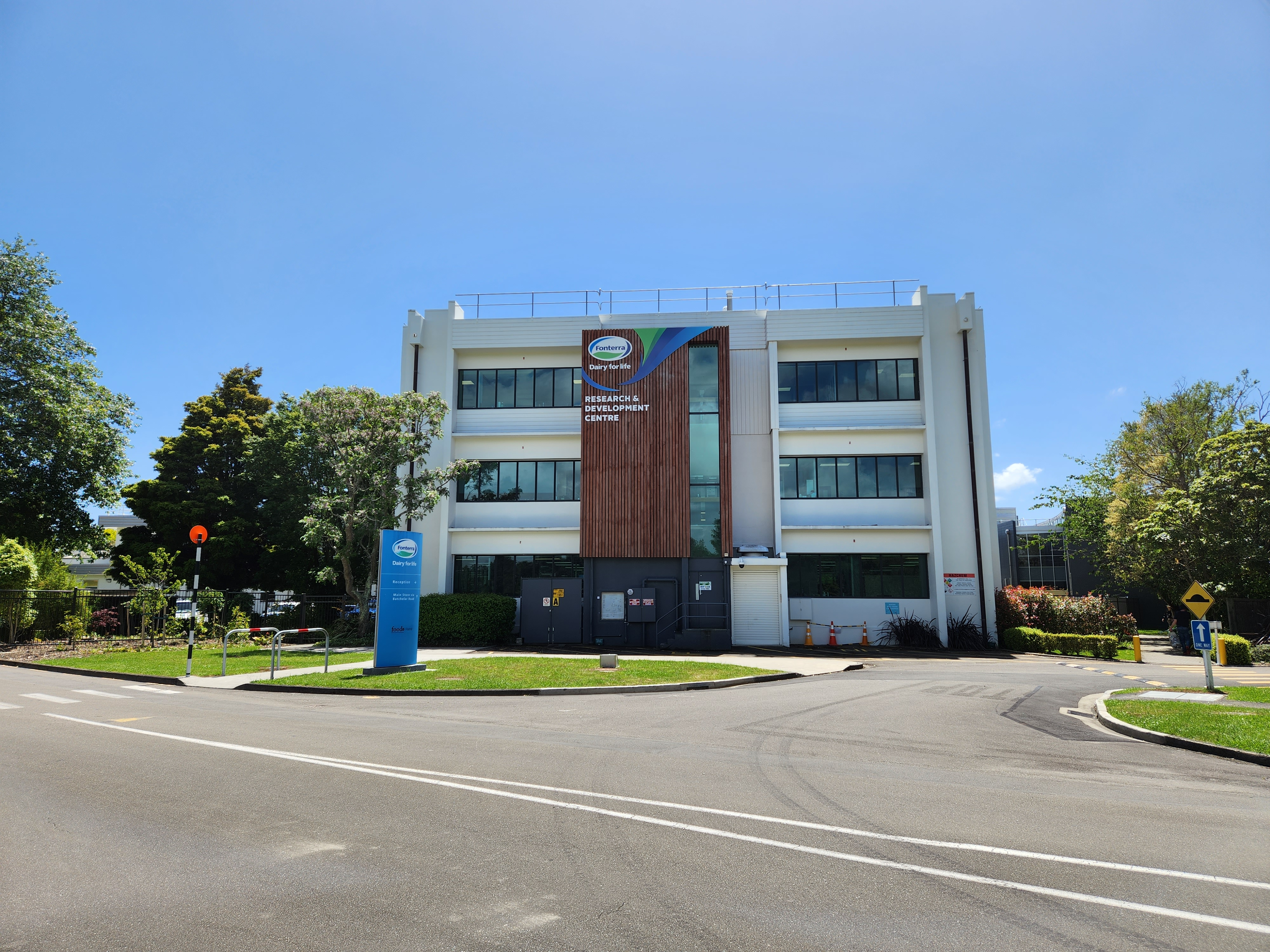
The Fonterra Research and Development Centre (FRDC) in Palmerston North

In 1927 the New Zealand Dairy Research Institute (NZDRI) was founded in Palmerston North as part of the Department of Scientific Industrial Research, which was renamed to the Fonterra Research and Development Centre (FRDC) when Fonterra was formed in 2001. FRDC is purportedly one of the largest dairy research centres in the world, and as of 2019, it hosts several hundred engineers, scientists and researchers and holds 350 milk related patents. A large number of technologies involving whey, casein, lactoferrin, nisin, anhydrous milk fat, as well as cheesemaking and milk powder production have been developed at the centre.

FRDC has a substantial library of over 100,000 cheese starter cultures, which began in the 1930s under Hugh Whitehead. The centre has pioneered research on bacteriophages; in 1935 a bacteriophage was identified as the cause of failure in cheese starter isolates, and in 1992 the centre sequenced the genome of bacteriophage c2, which was the first whole genome to be sequenced in New Zealand.

== Corporate structure ==
=== Governance ===
John Roadley was the inaugural chairman of Fonterra's board. He foreshadowed his resignation in August 2002 and was succeeded, after the next annual general meeting, by Henry van der Heyden. Van der Heyden held the chairmanship until December 2012. John Wilson succeeded van der Heyden and announced his resignation in July 2018 due to illness (he died in January 2019 aged 54). John Monaghan succeeded Wilson. In March 2020, he foreshadowed that he would step down in November 2020. In June 2020, Peter McBride was announced as Monaghan's successor.

Name	Portrait	Start	End
John Roadley		October 2001	September 2002
Henry van der Heyden		September 2002	December 2012
John Wilson		December 2012	July 2018
John Monaghan		July 2018	November 2020
Peter McBride		November 2020	

=== Subsidiaries ===
- Fonterra Brands – consumer goods business
- NZMP Ingredients – global ingredients business
- Fonterra Global Dairy Trade – dairy ingredients supplier to the globally traded market
- Anchor Food Professionals – foodservices supplies
- Fonterra Group Manufacturing – food processing and manufacturing operations
- Fonterra Milk Supply – collection and distribution of milk from farms
- Shared Services – finance, communications, M&D, human resources, strategy and information services
- Farm Source (formerly RD1) – is a wholly owned rural retail and farmer support supplier. RD1 was formed at the end of 2001 through the merger of RD1.com and the Town & Country Agri-centres, Fonterra's two rural supply companies. In 2014, Farm Source was launched as a new brand platform for RD1 and provides retail benefits including Farm Source Rewards. Farm Source is also the farmer support business unit, with Area Managers, Sustainable Dairying Advisors and Technical Sales Representatives providing on-farm tools and advice for farmers, such as Farm Environment Plans. Farm Source is New Zealand's largest retailer of agricultural supplies to dairy farmers. There are 66 Farm Source stores across New Zealand as well an online ecommerce offer.

=== Changes to capital structure ===
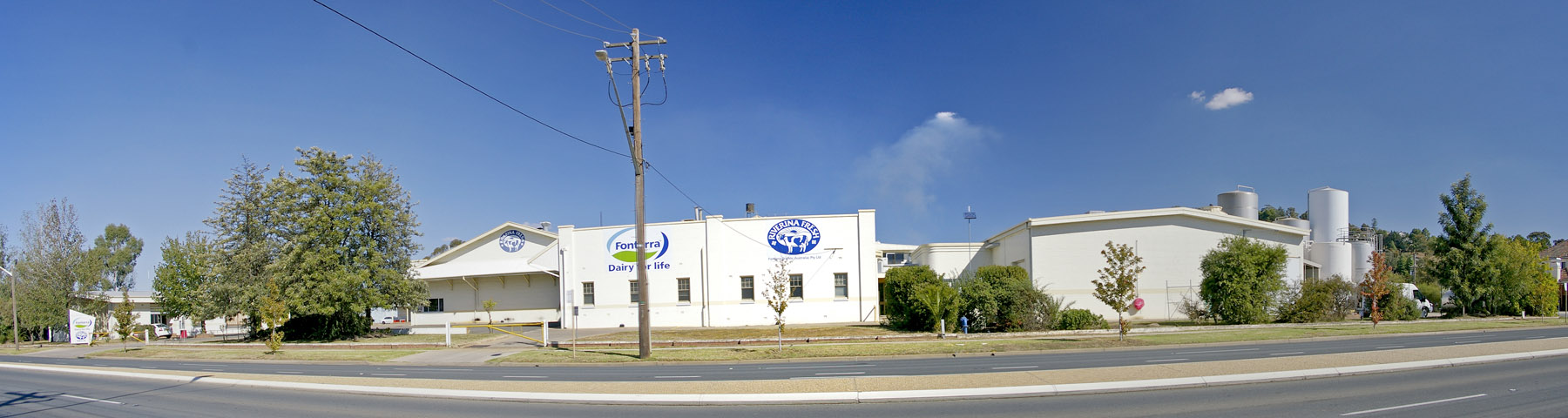
Fonterra Riverina Fresh in Wagga Wagga, New South Wales, Australia

In November 2007, the board of directors announced a two-year consultation programme regarding their preferred capital re-structuring option: putting the business operations in a separate publicly listed company, with the co-operative maintaining a controlling interest. The aim was to give more access to funds for global growth.

Praised by some as a bold move which would allow better access to outside capital, the proposals encountered significant opposition from both farmer shareholders and the government (who would be required to pass enabling legislation). Despite including a range of safeguards, farmers were clearly concerned at the risk of losing control; in what was sometimes described as a demutualization.

The board responded in 2008 by shelving the November 2007 proposal and continuing consultation and discussion with farmer shareholders. In September 2009, the board announced a three-step process to revamp Fonterra's capital structure. The new approach abandoned thoughts of a public listing of Fonterra shares and retained 100% farmer control and ownership of the co-operative.

A key goal of the capital structure changes was to stop large amounts of money washing in and out of Fonterra's balance sheet each year as milk production fluctuates. Under the previous structure, farmers matched their shareholding with their milk production by owning one co-operative share for each kilogram of milksolids (kgMS) produced annually. If their milk production dropped in any season, they could redeem shares back to the co-operative, which was required to buy the shares back off them. Consequently, Fonterra faced the risk of losing large amounts of share capital through redemptions during times of declining milk production. For instance, after milk production fell during the 2007/08 drought, Fonterra had to pay out $742 million of share capital to farmers via redemptions.

The capital structure changes also sought to provide greater incentives for farmers to increase their investment in Fonterra shares, helping ensure Fonterra has sufficient share capital to fund profitable business opportunities and drive a higher payout to dairy farmers.

The first two steps of capital structure change received good support from farmer shareholders at Fonterra's annual meeting in November 2009. The first step allowed farmers to hold shares above their level of annual milk production; farmers could now own an additional 20% of "dry" shares (i.e. up to a maximum of 1.2 shares per kgMS). There were also enhanced incentives for farmers to hold shares even if their production falls. The rules about the pricing of end of season share transactions were also tidied up.

The second step changed the way Fonterra shares were valued to reflect that share ownership is restricted to farmers only. Previously, Fonterra shares were valued on a theoretical basis as if the shares were freely traded like a public share. An independent valuator subsequently assessed that the restricted market value should be at a 25% discount to the freely traded value.

The third step, titled "Trading Among Farmers", involves more far-reaching change to Fonterra's capital structure. The co-operative would no longer be obliged to issue or redeem shares at a price established via an independent valuation process. Instead, farmers would buy or sell shares among themselves at market prices through a farmer-only share trading market. This would have the effect of making Fonterra shares permanent capital, providing the co-operative with more confidence to invest in long-term projects without fear that some of its share capital might be needed to fund redemptions in future years.

As part of the changes, farmers would have greater flexibility with their Fonterra shareholding. The maximum shareholding would be 2 times production (up from the 1.2 times approved in step one) and farmers would have up to three years to comply with shareholding rules when entering/exiting the co-operative or increasing/decreasing their milk production.

Additionally, Fonterra would set up a special fund that would financially help farmers purchase shares (or retain shares they would otherwise have to sell). The fund would pay farmers for the right to receive dividends and the gain/loss from any changes in value of some of their shares, but the farmer would still be the owner of the shares. The fund would raise the money it needed to pay farmer shareholders by selling investment units to investors. Fonterra would require the fund to target "friendly" investors such as sharemilkers, retired farmers and offshore Fonterra suppliers, although the public and institutions would also be able to participate.

The "Trading Among Farmers" proposal went before a special meeting on 30 June 2010 and received 89% support from farmer shareholders voting, easily exceeding the 75% threshold required for a favourable vote.

In May 2021, Fonterra started a consultation process to seek farmer feedback on potential options to change its capital structure.

Based on farmer feedback over the consultation period as well as further expert advice, a proposal was put forward in September 2021 to move to a Flexible Shareholding structure, aimed at giving farmers more financial flexibility.

In December 2021, the new Flexible Shareholding structure received a strong mandate with [85.16%] of total farmer votes cast in support of the recommendation and [82.65%] participation based on milk solids voted.

Fonterra is continuing to work with the Government on how the Flexible Shareholding structure can be given effect under the Dairy Industry Restructuring Act, the legislation that enabled the formation of Fonterra back in 2001.

== Brands ==
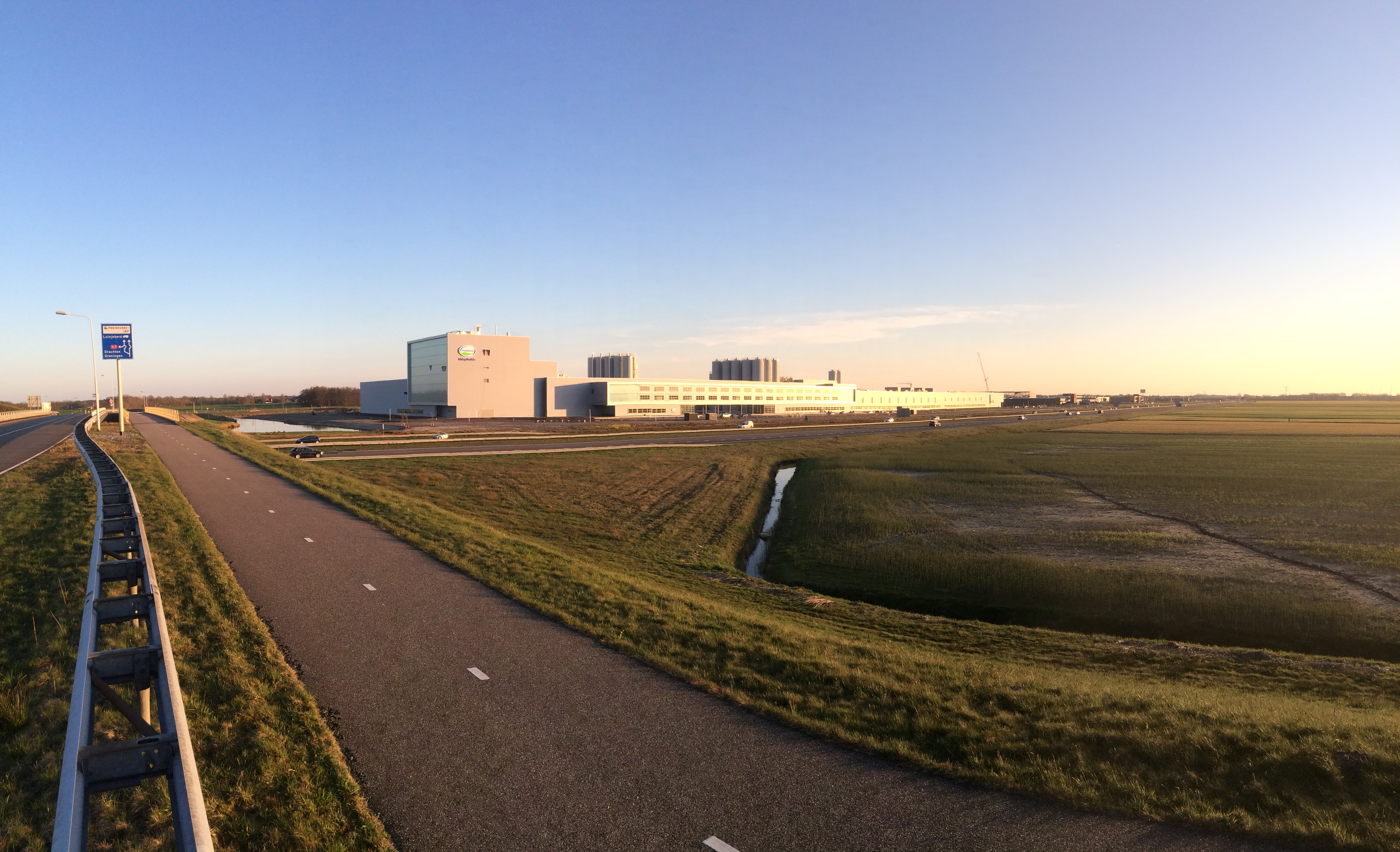
Fonterra milk powder factory in Heerenveen, The Netherlands

=== International ===
- Anchor (milk)
- Anlene
- Anmum
- Mainland (cheese, butter)
- NZMP (ingredients)
- Anchor Food Professionals (foodservice supplies)
- Nutiani

=== New Zealand ===
- Anchor (milk, cream, butter, yoghurt)
- Anchor CalciYum (flavoured milk, custard yoghurt, ice cream)
- Anchor Uno (Children's yoghurt)
- Anmum
- BioKodeLab
- Country Goodness (butter-margarine blend spread, cultured sour cream dips)
- De Winkel (yoghurt)
- Fresh 'n Fruity (yoghurt)
- Galaxy (speciality cheese)
- Kapiti (ice cream, speciality cheese, yoghurt)
- Mainland (cheese, butter)
- Mammoth Supply Co. (flavoured milk)
- Perfect Italiano (cheese)
- Primo (flavoured milk)
- Tip Top (ice cream) – Sold to Froneri in 2019

=== Australia ===
- Bonlac
- Anchor CalciYum
- Anchor (milk and cream)
- Mainland (cheese & butter)
- Mammoth Energy
- Munchables
- Perfect Italiano
- Western Star (butter)

=== Sri Lanka ===
- Ratthi (milk powder, yoghurt)
- Anchor Newdale (flavoured milk, yoghurt, drinking yoghurt)
- Red Cow (2 in 1 milk powder)
- anlene
- Anchor (milk, milk powder, butter)
- Anchor non fat
- Anchor Family Pro +
- Anchor Pediapro

== Environmental performance ==
=== Initiatives ===
Dairying stock entering waterways due to lack of fencing and poor use of fertilisers are major contributors to water pollution in New Zealand. Fonterra's environmental policy states that "Fonterra shall demonstrate a global commitment to protecting the environment. Sustainability, good environmental practice and environmental improvement are cornerstones of Fonterra's environmental commitment." Fonterra claims to have a number of initiatives such as the Dairying and Clean Streams Accord, relating to environmental protection to achieve this policy. In December 2011, the Green Party questioned Fonterra's credibility and the effectiveness of the self-auditing approach given the wide discrepancy between Fonterra's claims and an independent audit of Dairying and Clean Streams Accord.

In 2003, Fonterra became a signatory to the Dairying and Clean Streams Accord, which sets a timeframe for the improvement of water quality on farms. Progress on the Accord goals is reported by the signatories in March of each year on the basis of data collected by Fonterra. The integrity of this data was later questioned when a 2012 independent report commissioned by MAF indicated that while Fonterra's survey of farmers suggests that nationally 84% of properties have stock excluded from waterways, an independent audit by MAF revealed a position that only 42% of farms nationally had stock exclusion. The difference in Fonterra's results against those in an independent audit suggest further work is required by Fonterra to protect streams and that evaluating success in this area may be better carried out by an independent third party auditor.

In July 2007, the Green Party called on Fonterra to use financial penalties on its suppliers who were "dirty dairying", and to particularly penalise the 'recidivist polluters' the Crafar Farms. In 2010, Fonterra launched its every farm every year initiative. Fonterra plans to check every farm's effluent management infrastructure every year in a move to address non-compliance with regional council dairy effluent rules. The 2012 independent audit spurred further progress in this area with Fonterra announcing that suppliers will be required to complete fencing of Accord waterways by June 2013. Whether this will occur is yet to be seen.

In February 2008, the inaugural Fonterra Environmentalist of the Year was announced at the Beehive. The Award continues a partnership between Keep New Zealand Beautiful and Fonterra. Fonterra is also a Corporate Sponsor of the Society and each year teams of staff from the company's manufacturing sites participate in the Keep New Zealand Beautiful Clean Up Week campaign, clearing rubbish from around roadsides, sports fields, parks and beaches. These activities have been criticised as token however as they have limited impacts on preventing stock from entering waterways and in assisting farmer to implement more effective fertiliser regimes that could cut farmers costs and improve water quality.

=== Biofuels ===
Fonterra is New Zealand's largest producer of biofuel, processing a waste stream from casein manufacture into bio-ethanol. The company produces around 20 million litres of premium ethanol annually. Since 2004, Fonterra has produced ethanol from whey, a by-product of casein, in the Edgecumbe, Tirau and Reporoa plants. In 2008, Fonterra began supplying Gull Petroleum with ethanol from its Edgecumbe plant. The fuel has significant environmental benefits as it is renewable and biodegradable.

In July 2016, Fonterra announced that their tanker fleet was switching to ZBioD (Z Energy's biodiesel fuel) as a foundation customer. Chief Operating Officer Global Operations, Robert Spurway said "the move to biodiesel has the potential to reduce emissions for the tankers using it up to four per cent each year, and the partnership is an important milestone for Fonterra."

=== Manawatū River waste water ===
In 2006, Forest and Bird asked Fonterra to 'clean up its act', instead of obtaining consent to continue to discharge 8,500 cubic metres per day of wastewater into the Manawatū River. Fonterra responded to Forest and Bird's request, agreeing to treat wastewater it discharges into the Manawatū River, greatly reducing its impact on the river. Treatment will be phased in so that by 2015 the discharge will be treated to a level where the water will be fit to swim in year-round.

In 2010, Fonterra signed a voluntary agreement with local councils and freezing works to clean up the river. Fonterra has since encouraged its farmers to clean up their waste and plant trees alongside waterways.

=== Deforestation allegations ===
In August 2009, Greenpeace claimed that Fonterra was implicated in the destruction of Indonesian and Malaysian rainforests, causing deaths of orangutans and increased global greenhouse gas emissions. In response, Federated Farmers said the use of palm kernel does not cause the destruction of tropical forests as it is a waste by-product with almost no commercial value. A spokesperson John Hartnell stated that "Not one millimetre of forest is being cleared just to feed dairy cows".

Fonterra says it shares community concern about tropical deforestation, "which in some cases has been driven by the establishment of palm oil plantations". Fonterra says it has been proactive in ensuring a sustainable supply of palm kernel "and ensuring we do not support deforestation, directly or indirectly."

Fonterra is a member of the Roundtable for Sustainable Palm Oil to ensure it was informed on sustainability issues in South-East Asia and "to actively contribute to more robust sustainability certification systems."

Fonterra was also the subject of Greenpeace Aotearoa New Zealand protests off the Port of Tauranga on 16 September 2009 and Port Taranaki on 5 February 2011, where Greenpeace activists invaded ships carrying palm kernel animal feed, destined for dairy farms.

Palm kernel imports went from 0.4 tonnes in 1999 to 455,000 tonnes in 2007 and then to 1.1 million tonnes in 2008, one quarter of the world's palm-based animal feed. Greenpeace says that deforestation for the production of palm products is a significant cause of climate change, and loss of bio-diversity.

Greenpeace campaign director Chris Harris said only 4 per cent of palm oil came from sustainable sites. Greenpeace stated that forests were being cleared for the planting of the trees that produce palm oil.

In August 2016, Fonterra announced a new palm products sourcing standard that was developed in consultation with key supply partners, and following discussions with Greenpeace that began in December 2015. "The new standard requires Fonterra to purchase on segregated supply palm oil by 2018, and to work with suppliers of palm products to ensure that plans are in place for full traceability to plantation by 2018", said Fonterra's director of social responsibility, Carolyn Mortland.

=== Lignite coal use protest ===
On 17 November 2009, Greenpeace members protested at Solid Energy's New Vale opencast lignite mine near Gore, New Zealand, by unfurling a 40 by 40-metre banner reading 'Fonterra Climate Crime'. Greenpeace was protesting about Fonterra's use of brown coal (lignite) at the nearby Edendale Fonterra plant. Greenpeace alleged that the Edendale plant will burn 179,000 tonnes of lignite, which will release over 250,000 tonnes of carbon emissions.

In response to the protest, Fonterra said, "We use 13.9 percent less energy to produce each tonne of export product than we did in 2003. That's equivalent to the energy required to power 100,000 homes and, relative to 2003, represents a 320,000 tonne reduction in CO_{2}e greenhouse gas emissions in 2010. We use the best mix of energy sources available to us at every one of our sites. We're continually looking for ways to be more energy efficient."

In late 2018, Fonterra's Brightwater milk-processing plant, in association with Azwood Energy, began burning wood biomass, alongside coal, to reduce carbon emissions. Fonterra's Stirling milk-processing plant will run solely on electricity.

In February 2019, 350 Aotearoa, the New Zealand arm of the international climate movement 350.org, produced a video entitled, "Coalterra, Dairy for Death" critical of Fonterra's coal use – estimated at half a million tonnes per year.

In July 2019, Fonterra announced it would install no new coal boilers. Coal Action Network Aotearoa welcomed the decision, but warned against utilising other fossil fuels, such as gas, in substitution, suggesting wood biomass, as a better alternative.

=== Pollution prosecution ===
In September 2010, Bay of Plenty Regional Council made a statement that it had prosecuted Fonterra for allowing nitric acid and a caustic cleaning agent from its Edgecumbe milk processing plant to spill into a storm water drain and into a water course. Fonterra was fined $24,000. The Dominion Post and The New Zealand Herald reported the prosecution.

Fonterra is currently educating its sites on the best way to reduce pollution.

=== Environmental Awards ===
In 2007, Fonterra won two awards in the Energy Efficiency and Conservation Authority, Energywise Awards:

1. Transpower Project Innovation Award; Winner: Fonterra Co-operative Group – Whareroa heat recovery loop
2. Contact Energy Management Award; Winner: Fonterra Co-operative Group – Energy efficient project management team Fonterra was also commended for its road to rail project by the EECA.

In 2008, Fonterra Edendale won the New Zealand Clean Air Society's annual Clean Air award, which recognises exceptional contributions by individuals and businesses to researching and improving the environment.

In 2009, Fonterra won the supreme prize at the Packaging Council of New Zealand's Environmental Packaging Awards for its introduction and promotion of a more environmentally sustainable packaging.

In 2012 Fonterra won the Export Category at the 2012 TVNZ New Zealand Marketing Awards for their Anchor Strong marketing to the Pacific, with designs by Dow Design.

In 2016, Energy Efficiency and Conservation Authority (EECA) recognised Fonterra's Edendale Site as the most energy efficient dairy manufacturing site in New Zealand.

In 2019, Fonterra business, NZAgbiz were awarded finalists in the 'Going Circular' category.

In 2021, Fonterra received the Low Carbon Future Award for the conversion to renewable wood pallets at the Te Awamutu site. The Low Carbon Future Award recognises emission reduction initiative undertaken by the New Zealand energy sector.

In 2022, Fonerra's NZMP Organic Butter – Carbonzero Certified won the "Most Innovative Dairy Product Award" at the Gulfood Innovation Awards.

In 2022, Fonterra's Maungaturoto site was recognised at the Water New Zealand Excellence Award for the reduction of water usage by 25%.

== Product issues ==
=== Sanlu milk scandal ===
In September 2008, one of the biggest dairy companies in China, the Shijiazhuang Sanlu Group, 43% owned by Fonterra, recalled more than 10,000 tonnes of infant formula after a food safety scandal involving the criminal contamination of its raw milk supply with melamine. Court papers showed the company first began receiving complaints of children becoming sick after drinking its milk in December 2007, but only stopped production when Fonterra blew the whistle in September 2008. After the initial focus on Sanlu, China's quality watchdog said that inspectors had also found the chemical melamine in baby formula produced by 22 companies nationwide. An estimated 300,000 Chinese babies were affected, and six died after developing kidney problems as a result of drinking formula containing melamine.

Fonterra first became aware of problems on 2 August 2008, when the Sanlu board, which had three Fonterra directors, was advised there was a problem with the contamination of infant formula. A trade recall began shortly after Fonterra was first notified. Prime Minister Helen Clark later said Fonterra had been lobbying for a public recall since 2 August, but that "local authorities in China would not do it. At a local level ... I think the first inclination was to try and put a towel over it and deal with it without an official recall." Ms Clark said she first heard of the contamination on 5 September and three days later ordered that Beijing be told directly, bypassing local and provincial Chinese authorities.

On 21 September 2008, an editorial in The New Zealand Herald questioned the "moral courage and leadership" of Fonterra chief executive Andrew Ferrier. Citing Fonterra's number one corporate value, the journal questioned why it took nearly a month after it had become aware of the contamination before it notified the government. It said Fonterra's press release had been "minutely scrutinised by lawyers and spin doctors, and that the company was far less interested in 'moral courage and leadership' than it was in preserving its own position." The next day, Helen Clark, agreed that the company had been too slow to speak out. Ferrier was also condemned by Business Day for his "silent hand-wringing", when he should have immediately blown the whistle. Ferrier denied Fonterra knew that Sanlu lied for eight months to hide complaints about its baby formula causing illness. However, Access Asia, a Shanghai-based consumer consultancy, said Fonterra was a classic example of western executives in China heeding advice found in business books to, "avoid making their local partners 'lose face' at all costs." It suggested Fonterra paid a heavy price in write-offs, a wrecked business and public condemnation.

In a video press conference with reporters in September 2008, Ferrier said Sanlu's milk supply may have been sabotaged. He added the company did not come forward with the information earlier because it was waiting for the recall process to move through the Chinese system.

David Oliver, a New Zealander who works as a corporate advisor to companies in the Chinese agricultural industry, feels that while Fonterra had board representation in Sanlu, it is unlikely they had much influence within the company as they had only a minority stake.

Ferrier said, "I can look myself in the mirror and say Fonterra acted absolutely responsibly in this one. If you don't follow the rules of an individual market place then I think you are getting irresponsible." Ferrier later said the feedback he received from both government and business contacts in China was that Fonterra was seen to have acted with integrity.

In September 2008, Henry van der Heyden, chairman of the board, said "As a direct consequence of the criminal contamination of milk in China, Fonterra has recognised an impairment charge of $139 million against the carrying value of its investment in SanLu." "We've learnt an incredibly painful lesson through this and we will be much, much more suspicious worldwide on ensuring the safety and integrity of our supply chain everywhere in the world", said Ferrier. But he also pointed out that the company can never be 100% certain against a criminal contamination of the supply chain, which is what happened in this incident.

On 17 September 2008, Fran O'Sullivan noted that Fonterra had already set "up a 3000-head dairy farm in China itself to provide quality product and demonstrate best practice."

On 10 October 2008, Ferrier announced in Beijing that Fonterra will "donate NZ$8.4 million to the Soong Ching Ling Foundation over five years for a co-operative charity project to provide medical care and advice to pregnant women and the mothers of infants in rural communities." Andrew Ferrier said Fonterra was "shocked by the degree of tragedy" and the donated fund is set up to "help over the long-term in infants and maternal mother health." Andrew Ferrier said Chinese consumers have lost confidence in Sanlu, not Fonterra, and Fonterra is working towards rebuilding a safe supply chain of dairy products.

In April 2009, during a state visit by New Zealand Prime Minister John Key to Beijing, Chinese Premier Wen Jiabao asked Prime Minister Key for help in developing food safety standards for China. Mr Key said the Chinese Premier considers 2008's contaminated milk scandal a one-off incident that can be put behind both countries. A report by Fran O'Sullivan in the New Zealand Herald said that Fonterra had learnt some heavy lessons from Sanlu and the company would have to have confidence in the safety of its milk supply chain in China before reinvesting significantly in the local production of dairy products.

On 24 November 2009 two Sanlu former workers Zhang Yujun and Geng Jinping were executed.

=== DCD contamination ===
In September 2012, traces of 2-Cyanoguanidine, a fertiliser commonly referred to as DCD that is used to slow down nitrate leaching, was found in some milk samples. Fonterra, Federated Farmers and the Government moved quickly to reassure the public and overseas buyers there was no risk to health. Fonterra has received praise for its handling of the DCD issue. The levels were very low and attempts were made to prevent the test results from being reported in the media.

On 16 August 2013 a Sri Lankan court banned the sale and advertising of all Fonterra products in Sri Lanka. The health ministry has said tests by Sri Lanka's Industrial Technology Institute found DCD in some Fonterra powdered milks and it had ordered their recall.

=== Botulism scare ===
On 3 August 2013, authorities in New Zealand announced a global recall of up to 1,000 tonnes of dairy products after tests identified a type of bacteria that could cause botulism. Products included were infant formula, sports drinks, protein drinks and other beverages. The countries affected were New Zealand, China, Australia, Thailand, Malaysia, Vietnam, Sri Lanka and Saudi Arabia.

Fonterra's head of its milk products business, Gary Romano, resigned over the scandal on 14 August 2013.

In late August 2013 laboratory test results revealed that the bacteria found in the whey protein concentrate manufactured by Fonterra was not the botulism-causing Clostridium botulinum.

== Legal issues ==
=== Court case of Fonterra vs Bega Cheese ===
Fonterra marketed and distributed the Bega Cheese brand, under an agreement established between the two companies in 1999. Fonterra later raised the issue of Bega otherwise using the Bega brand to market peanut butter. Bega themselves have since challenged this, accusing Fonterra of not living up to the agreement by not promoting the brand and therefore devaluing it. This case ended on 25 February 2021, when the Victoria Supreme Court dismissed all claims. Bega is allowed to continue to sell market peanut butter, but the court found Fonterra had no obligation to promote the brand as Bega claimed.

=== Greenpeace ===
In September 2024, Greenpeace announced they were suing Fonterra for breaching the Fair Trading Act. Greenpeace claimed that the Fonterra marketing of milk from "100% New Zealand grass-fed" cows was misleading when up to a fifth of an animal's diet might be imported palm kernel. Palm kernel is considered to be linked to deforestation, and New Zealand imports two million tonnes of it annually.

=== Smith v Fonterra Co-operative Group Ltd ===
In 2019, a lawsuit was filed against several companies, including Fonterra, on the basis that these companies were major greenhouse gas emitters contributing to climate change. Two of the three claims were initially dismissed by the High Court of New Zealand and the Court of Appeal, but eventually reinstated by the Supreme Court. Before the case went to trial, the New Zealand Government announced a law change which would prevent the case from going ahead. It was then revealed that the law change had been suggested in an initially undisclosed briefing document sent directly to the Prime Minister's chief policy adviser by Fonterra and Z Energy.

== See also ==
- Dairy farming in New Zealand
