= Beatrice Foods Canada =

Canadian dairy company

Beatrice Foods Canada Ltd.
- Founded: 1969
- Headquarters: Toronto, Ontario, Canada
- Parent: Lactalis Canada
- Website: beatrice.ca

Beatrice Foods Canada Ltd. is a dairy unit of Lactalis Canada based in Toronto. The Canadian unit of Beatrice Foods was founded in 1969 and separated from its American parent firm, Beatrice Foods in 1978. The Beatrice trademark in Canada is owned by Lactalis Canada.

In 1970 Beatrice Foods acquired Ideal Dairy (founded 1931) and merged fully by 1975.

Consequently, Beatrice's Canadian operations were not affected by the buyout of its founders and remained in business as one of Canada's largest food processing concerns. In 1997, Beatrice Foods Canada was acquired by the Italian conglomerate Parmalat. Parmalat initially dropped the Beatrice name from its products but the name was reinstated in late 2005 during which the parent company was being investigated. Lactalis later acquired Parmalat and Beatrice Foods Canada is now a part of Lactalis Canada.

Beatrice Foods Canada also owned companies in Canada such as Modern Dairies, Crescent Creamery, Royal Dairies and Standard Dairies in Manitoba.

== Products ==
Beatrice Canada's main products are milk, orange juice, butter and cheese. Other dairy products sold under the Beatrice name include yogurt, cream cheese and cream.

== Operations ==
Beatrice's main distribution and production centres are located in Montreal, Toronto and Calgary.
