= Lactalis =

French multinational dairy products corporation

Groupe Lactalis S.A.
- Trade name: Lactalis
- Formerly: Besnier S.A.
- Type: Private
- Industry: Dairy products
- Founded: 19 October 1933; 93 years ago
- Founder: André Besnier
- Headquarters: Laval, Mayenne, France
- Area served: Worldwide
- Key people: Emmanuel Besnier (CEO)
- Products: Cheese, butter, milk
- Revenue: ▲€32.1 billion (2025)
- Net income: ▲€528 million (2025)
- Owner: Besnier family via Belgian holding company BSA International SA
- Number of employees: 85,000
- Subsidiaries: Lactalis-Nestlé Fresh Products; Lactalis Nestle Chilled Dairy Co. Ltd. Lactalis Midwest Yogurt; Kraft Natural Cheese; Siggi's Dairy; Stonyfield Farm; Anchor, Mainland, Kāpiti; Lactalis Canada
- Website: lactalis.com/en/

Groupe Lactalis S.A. (doing business as Lactalis) is a French multinational dairy products corporation, owned by the Besnier family and based in Laval, Mayenne, France. The company's former name was Besnier S.A. until 1999.

Lactalis is the largest dairy products group in the world, and first milk seller in France. It owns brands such as Parmalat, Président, Kraft Natural Cheese, Siggi's Dairy, Skånemejerier, Rachel's Organic, and Stonyfield Farm. It also markets Yoplait products in the United States.

As of 2020, Lactalis employs approximately 85,000 people in 51 countries and 266 plants around the world. In the same year, net sales amounted to €21.1 billion.

== History ==
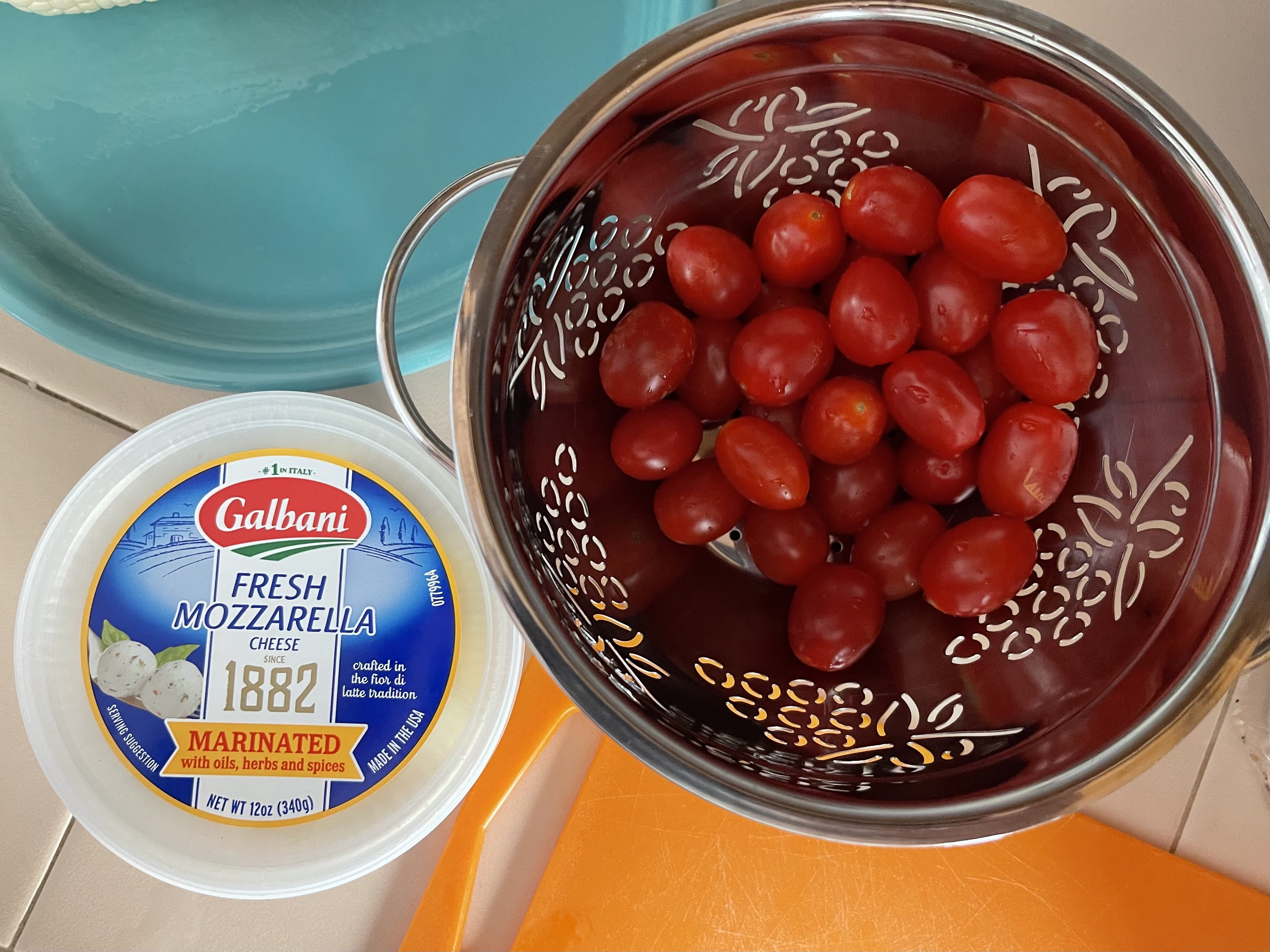
Galbani mozzarella with cherry tomatoes

André Besnier started a small cheesemaking company in 1933 and launched its Président brand of Camembert in 1968. In 1990, it acquired Group Bridel (2,300 employees, 10 factories, fourth-largest French dairy group) with a presence in 60 countries. In 1992, it acquired United States cheese company Sorrento. In 1999, la société Besnier became le groupe Lactalis owned by Belgian holding company BSA International SA. The group was then number one in the sector in Europe, dealing with more than 6.6 billion liters per year. In 2006, they bought Italian group Galbani, and in 2008, bought Swiss cheesemaker Baer. In 2006, the company formed a joint venture with Nestlé, Lactalis-Nestlé Fresh Products.

In 2007, the French Institut National des Appellations d'Origine, which administers AOC (L'appellation d'origine contrôlée) designations for French food products, refused to permit Lactalis and the dairy cooperative, Isigny-Sainte-Mère, to sell pasteurized Camembert as "true Camembert". As of 2007, these two companies represented between 80 and 90% of Normandy Camembert sales. During that same year, it acquired the Croatian dairy company Dukat. In 2018, the INAO announced it would relax restrictions and create a new designation to include pasteurized Camembert in 2021.

Lactalis bought Italian group Parmalat in a 2011 2.5B € takeover after its bankruptcy and have since sought to delist it. The purchase of Parmalat added operations in Canada of Ault Foods, and its brands such as Astro, Balderson, Beatrice, Black Diamond and Lactantia, now made under the umbrella of subsidiary Lactalis Canada.

In 2012, Lactalis acquired the Swedish company Skånemejerier for 113 million euros.

In 2013, the Sorrento and Precious brands in the US were renamed Galbani, and the Sorrento Lactalis division was renamed Lactalis American Group.

In May 2015, Lactalis acquired an 80% stake in Turkish dairy Ak Gida, a subsidiary of Yıldız Holding.

In July 2017, it was announced that Groupe Danone had agreed to sell its Stonyfield Farm subsidiary to Lactalis for US$875 Million to avoid anti-trust claims and to clear the way for Danone's acquisition of U.S. organic food producer WhiteWave Foods.

In December 2017, Lactalis announced the acquisition of dairy company Itambé.

In January 2018, Lactalis announced it had agreed to purchase the skyr producer Siggi's Dairy, which will continue to be run independently.

In October 2018, Lactalis announced the acquisition of Nestlé Malaysia's chilled dairy business unit for approximately $40 million.

Lactalis's Indian subsidiary Tirumala Milk Products said that it would acquire Prabhat's dairy business for ₹17 Billion. This will be Lactalis's third acquisition in India.

On 15 September 2020, Groupe Lactalis announced an agreement to acquire Kraft Heinz's natural cheese operations in North America and internationally for US$3.2 billion. The U.S. Department of Justice ruled that Lactalis must divest the Athenos and Polly-O cheese brands.

In April 2023, Lactalis American Group announced an investment of US$32 million to construct a new whey-processing facility in South Buffalo, boosting its production of the ingredient by 30%.

In September 2024, Lactalis Group announced the acquisition of General Mills' US yogurt business to expand its yogurt business in the United States market, pending regulatory approval. The acquisition was completed on June 30, 2025.

On 22 August 2025, Lactalis finalized its acquisition of several consumer brands from New Zealand dairy cooperative Fonterra, following confirmation of the sale in November 2024. The deal includes iconic brands such as Anchor, Mainland, Kāpiti, Anlene, Anmum, Fernleaf, Western Star, and Perfect Italiano, as well as Fonterra's food service and ingredients business operations in Oceania, Sri Lanka, the Middle East and Africa. The acquisition also includes 17 manufacturing sites, including three in New Zealand, marking Lactalis's significant expansion into the Australasian market. The transaction is subject to shareholder approval, with a Special Meeting scheduled for late October or early November 2025, and regulatory clearance from the Overseas Investment Office (NZ), Foreign Investment Review Board (Australia), and competition regulators in Kuwait, New Caledonia, and Saudi Arabia. In July 2025, the Australian Competition & Consumer Commission announced it would not oppose the acquisition. The acquisition was completed in April 2026, with the business being renamed Lactalis-Mainland Dairy.

In June 2026, Lactalis completed the acquisition of the UK-based company Protein Works. In July, two of Lactalis' brands, Castelli and Ambrosi, were recognized in the Guild of Fine Food's Great Taste Awards.

== Corporate governance and ownership ==
Emmanuel Besnier is President and main shareholder. Thierry Clément, is, since April 2022, general manager of operations.

=== Operations ===
Owned by the Belgian holding company BSA International SA, which is controlled by the Besnier family that founded Lactalis, Lactalis in 2015 had global revenues of 16.5 billion euros. Lactalis employs 75,000 people worldwide, at 237 production sites in 43 countries.

== Controversies ==
In August 2016, French farmers blockaded the company's headquarters in Laval, protesting what they saw as price fixing.

In 2020 allegations were made that 38 of Lactalis's production plants in France had breached environmental regulations, and had been doing so for a number of years. Lactalis stated it had invested €60 million in improving wastewater treatment plants.

In July 2023, Lactalis Australia was fined A$950,000 by the Federal Court for breaching the Dairy Code of Conduct in 2020.

In February 2024, the Spanish Audiencia Nacional fined Lactalis with 11.69 million euros for forming a cartel with other milk companies to avoid competition when buying milk from Spanish farmers between 2000 and 2013. The farmers can now further sue for damages.

In February 2024, police officers from the French National Fiscal Offenses Repression Brigade (BNRDF) raided the offices of Lactalis as well as its CEO's private mansion on suspicion of tax evasion. Lactalis is the target of a preliminary investigation by the French National Financial Prosecutor's Office (PNF) into aggravated tax fraud and aggravated laundering of tax fraud.

=== Salmonella scandal in France ===
In February 2023, Lactalis Group and their diary factory Celia Laiterie de Craon, were charged with aggravated deception/serious fraud, involuntary injuries and non-execution of withdrawal and recall measures in a five-year-old case where babies were diagnosed with salmonellosis after consuming the French dairy group's infant milk products, with both firms placed under judicial supervision with a bond of €300,000 each.

Towards the end of 2017, several cases of salmonella poisoning in France were linked to milk products from Lactalis-owned Milumel and Picot brands, delivered by their factory Celia Laiterie de Craon in Mayenne. In a small space of time, cases in Greece and Spain were also directly linked to the Lacalis-products from Craon.

In Mid January 2018, the company withdrew almost a year's production of 12 million boxes of baby formula due to a salmonella contamination that they claimed had occurred in the summer of 2017, and Lactalis eventually admitted that as many as 80 countries could be effected. Lactalis maintained throughout 2018 that it was an isolated incident that had caused the issues, but the Pasteur Institute stated that salmonella had been present since at least 2005, demonstrating 25 cases in the period 2005-2016 where babies had been infected with the exact same strain of the salmonella bacteria as found at the factory.

=== Russian activities ===
Lactalis, alongside Savencia, has attracted interest from Russian business figures, including Sergey Bachin, head of the Agranta group, who has reportedly expressed interest in their assets located in Russia. However, neither company has shown intention of leaving the market, raising concerns about their unwavering commitment to maintaining operations.

=== Controversies in Italy ===
Rai 3's PresaDiretta aired a special report titled "Italia in vendita", highlighting the increasing foreign acquisitions in Italy's agri-food sector, from North to South. The focus was on the dairy and cheese industries, particularly iconic products like mozzarella and Parmigiano Reggiano, which have been taken over by the French multinational Lactalis. The investigation explored operations at Parmalat's Collecchio plant, Nuova Castelli in Reggio Emilia, and Alival in Reggio Calabria and Tuscany.

The report concluded that Lactalis sought to integrate Italy's DOP products and brands—such as Galbani, Parmalat, Leerdammer, Castelli, Invernizzi, and the more recent acquisition of Ambrosi—into its global portfolio. It aimed to leverage Parmalat's international presence in Africa and Latin America, while closing down plants considered non-essential, such as Alival in Calabria and Tuscany, sparking controversy over a lack of social responsibility.

Lactalis faced significant backlash for its decision to shut down two production facilities: one in San Gregorio, Reggio Calabria, and another in Ponte Buggianese, Tuscany. The closure, impacting 80 workers and their families in Reggio Calabria, was widely condemned by local authorities and unions for the negative impact on the regional economy. Lactalis, which acquired Alival through the Castelli Group, justified the closures citing financial challenges worsened by the pandemic and international crises. Despite protests, the San Gregorio plant officially closed in January 2023, with only 4 out of 84 employees being relocated.

Swiss Journalist Klaus Davi strongly criticized the decision, stating: "The closure of the Lactalis plant in Reggio Calabria is an indefensible disgrace. Sending 80 workers home, pushing 80 families into poverty in a city like Reggio, is no small matter, especially when Italian food excellence is being celebrated."

In contrast, Tuscany's regional government took swift action, engaging local entrepreneurs to create favorable conditions for reemployment at the Ponte Buggianese plant. As a result of these efforts, 45 out of the 56 workers will be re-employed, providing stability after Lactalis' decision.

== See also ==
- List of cheesemakers
- List of companies of France
