= Weebl =

Weebl may refer to:

- Jonti "Weebl" Picking, a Flash cartoonist
- Weebl (also known as Wobbl), a fictional character in Picking's Weebl and Bob cartoon series

== See also ==
- Weeble, a line of children's toys
