= Anchor (brand) =

Brand of dairy products

- Company type: Private
- Industry: Dairy
- Founded: 3 November 1886
- Headquarters: Auckland, New Zealand
- Area served: Australia, Barbados, China, Chile, Ethiopia, Fiji, Indonesia, Malaysia, Mauritius, Middle East, New Zealand, Pacific Islands, Peru, Philippines, Singapore, South Korea, Sri Lanka, Taiwan and the United Kingdom
- Parent: Lactalis

Anchor is a brand of dairy products that was founded in New Zealand in 1886, and is one of the key brands owned by the New Zealand–based international exporter Fonterra Co-operative Group. In Malaysia, Singapore and Taiwan, Fonterra uses the Fernleaf brand instead of Anchor.

== Anchor by Fonterra ==
Historically, the Anchor brand of milk products in New Zealand was owned by the New Zealand Dairy Group, which merged with Kiwi Co Operative in 2001 to form Fonterra.

As the merger would leave New Zealand with virtually no competition in the domestic dairy sector, government legislation was required for Fonterra to be formed. One of the requirements was that Fonterra must divest its strongest domestic brand, Anchor, in the New Zealand market. This did not affect the brand internationally. The brand was sold to what is currently Goodman Fielder.

Between 2001 and 2005, Fonterra grew one of their smaller milk brands which was originally only available in the South Island of New Zealand, 'Meadow Fresh Milk', into a nationwide brand which provided good competition to the Anchor brand of milk products. In 2005, Fonterra did a brand swap with what is now Goodman Fielder, swapping Meadow Fresh for Anchor, allowing Fonterra to again align its international and domestic dairy brands.

On 11 November 2024, Fonterra confirmed that it would be selling several of its consumer brands including Anchor. On 22 August 2025, Fonterra confirmed it would sell Anchor along with several consumer brands and its processing operations in Australia and Sri Lanka to French dairy company Lactalis for NZ$3.845 billion, subject to a shareholder vote and regulatory approval.

=== Anchor Milk ===
Fresh Anchor Milk products available in New Zealand are manufactured and marketed by Fonterra Brands, a division of Fonterra. The main plant that processes Anchor milk in New Zealand is in Takanini, Auckland.

In addition to the common varieties with differing percentages of milk fat, they also offer "Anchor-Xtra", with extra calcium (marketed to "extra active" parents), and "Mega Milk", with extra vitamins, as well as extra calcium, marketed for children. In 2013, the Anchor brand was released in China.

=== Anchor Milk Powder ===
Anchor Milk Powder is the major Anchor product available in some developing countries, such as Guyana and Ethiopia.

=== Anchor Butter and Anchor Cheese ===
Anchor Butter and Anchor Cheese are sold in New Zealand, but the brand for these products in New Zealand is still owned by a Goodman Fielder subsidiary. For butter and cheese the brand was not returned to Fonterra in the brand swap so not all Anchor branded products are Fonterra products in New Zealand.

However, like most dairy products in New Zealand, the milk is still sourced from Fonterra suppliers and for butter and cheese, it is also likely that Fonterra manufactured the products with Goodman Fielder simply packaging the products.

== Outside New Zealand ==
Internationally the Anchor brand is 100% owned by the Fonterra Co-Op Group. It is available in (and manufactured in) many areas including:

- Australia
- Barbados
- China
- Chile
- Ethiopia
- Fiji
- Indonesia
- Malaysia
- Mauritius
- Middle East
- Pacific Islands
- Peru
- Philippines
- Singapore
- South Korea
- Sri Lanka
- Taiwan
- United Kingdom

In Britain, Anchor block butter was imported from New Zealand until August 2012 when Arla Foods UK transferred production to a local factory in Westbury, Wiltshire, using English cream.

== Anchor Spreadable ==
Anchor Spreadable is one of the brand's specialised products. This butter based spread is softened with canola oil and spreads easily, but marketing claims of its being spreadable direct from the fridge have been questioned. A campaign in 2003 for Anchor Spreadable, created by Jonti Picking, of Weebl and Bob fame, included television ads featuring wobbly cows.

Anchor Spreadable, as well as other New Zealand butter products, were banned from import into the EU for a short time. This came after a complaint made to the European Commissioner for Trade, Peter Mandelson, by the German dairy trader, Egenberger.

== See also ==
- Dairy farming in New Zealand
