= Badgers (animation) =

Animated internet meme

Looping GIF of the animation of badgers

"Badgers", also known informally as "Badger Badger Badger" or "The Badger Song", is an animated meme by British animator Jonti Picking, also known as Mr Weebl. It consists of twelve animated European badgers doing calisthenics, a mushroom in front of a tree, and a snake in the desert. The cartoon is accompanied by a music, above which a voiceover sings the names of what is shown on screen.

The cartoon went live on B3ta.com on 2 September 2003 at 3:59 a.m. BST. In its original Flash version, the cartoon loops indefinitely.

According to Mr Weebl, the inspiration behind "The Badger Song" comes from the song Saturday Night by Whigfield: "[Saturday Night] has a duck quacking throughout. I decided that the tune needed an annoying squeak sound in the background. The lyrics were meant to be a placeholder, but much like The Riddle by Nik Kershaw, the placeholder became the actual thing."

== Reception ==
The cartoon brought Picking to the attention of MTV Europe, for whom Picking produced Weebl and Bob. That cartoon series, together with the dancing badgers, helped Picking's website, Weebl's Stuff, win a People's Choice award from users of Yahoo! in the UK. "Badger Badger Badger" was also listed as one of the top five internet fads of all time by PC World in 2009. In May 2026, the video was preserved as part of the British Film Institute's Online Video collection.

== Other versions ==
There have been several follow-ups to the "Badger Badger Badger" cartoon posted to the Weebl's Stuff website. "Badgers 2" was created in 2003 and features zombie badgers on a black background with a scratching sound added to the music. A Christmas-themed version, with the badgers dressed in Santa Claus suits, the mushroom replaced with a present, and the snake replaced with baby Jesus in a nativity scene, is also available and was made for the 2004 Weebl Advent Calendar. "Badgers on a Plane" consists of a scene from a Snakes on a Plane trailer that includes badgers and a mushroom, which have been digitally edited into the scene, tumbling from their seats while a bit of the song plays in the background. In 2007, "Big Ass Badgers" was released to spoof the Transformers film. Also in 2007, a live-action version of the cartoon called "Baby Badgers" was released to promote the new Badger toys.

A "Euro 2004 Edition" was also created during the UEFA Euro 2004 football championship, where the badgers wore England football jerseys to "footy footy footy" and "England! England! Goal! A goal! Oh, it's a goal, scored by England, England..." A new version titled "Footy 2010" was created for the 2010 FIFA World Cup with vuvuzelas drowning out the audio. Another version, titled "Realistic Football Badgers", was created in response to England's 2014 FIFA World Cup loss. The song is referenced in the January 2004 comic strips of JD Fraser's User Friendly. A few of the characters interpreted "the song goes on about badgers, mushrooms and a snake" and that the song does not make sense.

A parody by a group called Fifth District, titled "Potter Potter Potter", depicts several images of Harry Potter dancing on the Hogwarts Campus, one image of Ron Weasley dancing in another area of the campus, and Severus Snape advancing menacingly toward the figures of the bespectacled wizarding teen, with a Whomping Willow tree and flying hippogriffs in the background. The chant is "Potter Potter Potter Potter", "Weasley! Weasley!", and "Snape! Snape! Oh, it's a Snape!".

In 2011, a dubstep version called "Guess I Got My Badger Back" was released based on "Swagga" by Excision & Datsik. On 6 April 2011, he uploaded a 3D version. A new version of the song was launched on the Moshi Monsters website, where the Monsters appear on the screen as "Moshi Moshi" is sung instead. Occasionally, there is a break where "Monster", or even rarer, "Moshling", is said instead. On 6 March 2013, Canadian musician Devin Townsend released a previously unreleased cover of the song while recording the album Deconstruction.

Another adaptation of the song, "Save the Badger Badger Badger", was released on 19 May 2013, in response to proposed badger culling in the United Kingdom. The song features vocals and guitar from Brian May and visuals reminiscent of the 1980 film Flash Gordon, in addition to vocals from Weebl and Brian Blessed. Some of the song's lyrics are changed. On 2 September 2023, Weebl's Stuff uploaded "20 Years of Badgers" in honour of the original video's 20th anniversary.

== See also ==
- List of Internet phenomena
