= Reach plc =

British newspaper and magazine publisher

- Formerly: Liverpool Daily Post the Liverpool Mercury and the Liverpool Echo Limited (1904–1923); The Liverpool Daily Post and Echo Limited (1923–1982); The Liverpool Daily Post and Echo plc (1982–1985); Trinity International Holdings plc (1985–1988); Trinity plc (1988–1999); Trinity Mirror plc (1999–2018)
- Type: Public limited company
- Traded as: LSE: RCH
- Industry: Publishing
- Founded: 1903; 123 years ago
- Headquarters: One Canada Square; London, England, UK
- Key people: Nicholas Prettejohn (Chairman); Piers North (CEO)
- Products: National and regional newspapers, magazines (see list of titles)
- Revenue: ▼£518.4 million (2025)
- Operating income: ▲£104.7 million (2025)
- Net income: ▼£(132.3) million (2025)
- Website: reachplc.com

Reach plc (known as Trinity Mirror between 1999 and 2018) is a British newsbrand, magazine and digital publisher. Its national titles include the Daily Mirror, Daily Express, Sunday Express, Daily Star, and OK! magazine. Its local titles include the Manchester Evening News, Liverpool Echo, BirminghamLive, and the Nottingham Post. They also publish BelfastLive, WalesOnline, and Scottish newspapers the Daily Record and Sunday Mail. Reach plc's headquarters are at One Canada Square in London. The company is listed on the London Stock Exchange.

== History ==
The Daily Mirror was launched by Alfred Harmsworth, 1st Viscount Northcliffe, "for gentlewomen" in 1903. The company was first listed on the London Stock Exchange in 1953. In 1958 the International Publishing Company (IPC) acquired Mirror Group Newspapers, but IPC was in turn taken over by publishing giant Reed International in 1970. In 1984 Pergamon Holdings, a company owned by Robert Maxwell, acquired the Daily Mirror from Reed International. The company was relisted as Mirror Group in 1991.

In 1991, the company was due to be investigated via an Anton Piller order for alleged theft of software from companies including Adobe Inc., Autodesk and Microsoft. The action was delayed as it coincided with Maxwell's death, but was recommenced in 1992. Subsequently it was reported that "At the Mirror Group, for instance, 700 out of the 800 software programs in use were found to be illegal".

The company bought Scottish & Universal Newspapers in 1992, and in 1997 it acquired the Birmingham Post and Mail group of newspapers. In 1999 Trinity International Holdings, owners of the Liverpool Echo, merged with Mirror Group to form Trinity Mirror.

During 2005, the company introduced a number of measures to manage discretionary spending more carefully, some of which attracted press attention.

In 2007, the company sought to sell a number of titles: the Reading Chronicle was sold to Berkshire Media Group and 25 Trinity Mirror South titles were sold to Northcliffe Media. On 1 October 2007 it was announced that the sale of the Racing Post had been completed: the entire sale process raised £263 million.

The Trinity Mirror logo used until May 2018

In September 2008, the company announced that it would be closing the printing plant in Liverpool after 154 years of printing in the city, and transferring the work to Oldham.

In February 2010, Trinity Mirror bought the regional M.E.N. Media and S&B Media divisions of Guardian Media Group, containing 22 local titles across Northern England and in Surrey and Berkshire. This included the Manchester Evening News and Reading Evening Post.

In March 2010 Trinity Mirror stated that it would end its bout of staff cuts and newspaper closures. The announcement came as the company reported pre-tax profits of £72.7m for 2009, exceeding analysts expectations.

In January 2012 it was announced that Trinity Mirror had acquired Communicator Corp, a digital communications company specialising in email and mobile communications for £8m. In August 2013, Trinity Mirror announced its partnership with whocanfixmycar.com, a portal connecting motorists nationwide with trusted local garages and mechanics.

In June 2014, Trinity Mirror transitioned its online bingo software to Virtue Fusion, supported by casino software from Playtech.

In November 2015, Trinity Mirror purchased Local World, a major stakeholder in local news titles, from Daily Mail and General Trust (DMGT). Local World had been formed by former Trinity chief exec David Montgomery in 2012 to consolidate all DMGT's local newspaper holdings other than the Metro, expanding their holdings while streamlining production, to make the group more saleable. Its 115 titles were formed primarily by those of Harmsworth's historic Northcliffe Newspapers Group, alongside other smaller purchases made by DMGT and Local World subsequently, including the 2007 purchase from Trinity. The purchase increased Trinity Mirror's local circulation by around 50%. The deal valued Local World at around £220 million.

In February 2018, the company completed the acquisition of the publishing assets of Northern & Shell, including the Daily Express, Sunday Express, Daily Star (collectively the Express & Star Group), and OK!. Following completion, Trinity Mirror announced a plan to rebrand as Reach, subject to investor approval at a meeting scheduled for May 2018. Following completion of the acquisition, the Competition and Markets Authority launched a preliminary investigation into the deal, requiring Trinity Mirror to keep Express Newspapers as a standalone entity.

In July 2020, Reach announced that it was cutting 550 jobs, 12% of its workforce, because of falling income amid reduced demand for advertising in its titles.

In early 2023, Reach announced its plans to expand into the US market, with digital activity for titles including the Mirror, Express and the Irish Star, having already launched Liverpool.com, a dedicated Liverpool FC site aimed at UK and US audiences. With a team of 70 people, it was profitable by 2025.

In March 2025, Chief Executive Jim Mullen stepped down from his role and was replaced by Piers North, formerly the company’s Chief Revenue Officer.

=== Phone hacking ===
In January 2011, former MP Paul Marsden announced that he was considering taking legal action against Trinity Mirror, over alleged phone hacking. On 24 September 2014, Trinity Mirror admitted that some of its journalists had been involved in phone hacking. It admitted liability and agreed to pay compensation to four people who had sued for the alleged hacking of voicemails (entertainer Shane Richie, soap actresses Shobna Gulati and Lucy Benjamin, and BBC creative director Alan Yentob). The four also received an apology. Trinity Mirror also announced that it had earlier settled six other phone hacking claims in relation to former England football manager Sven-Göran Eriksson, footballer Garry Flitcroft, actor Christopher Eccleston, showbusiness agent Phil Dale, Richie's wife Christine Roche and Abbie Gibson, a former nanny of David and Victoria Beckham. By September 2014, a further 19 claims were registered at the High Court and another 10 claimants had indicated they would bring proceedings against Trinity Mirror. Other reports claimed that the number of victims could be much higher, with Evan Harris, associate director of the pressure group Hacked Off describing the revelations as: "just the tip of a very big iceberg". On 6 November 2014, Graham Johnson, pleaded guilty at Westminster Magistrates' Court.

On 13 February 2015, Trinity Mirror published a public apology to "all its victims of phone hacking" on page two of the Daily Mirror. It also set aside funds to cover the cost of settling phone hacking compensation payments. The same apology was printed in the following editions of the Sunday People and Sunday Mirror.

A hearing at the High Court in London on 3 March 2015 heard that one Mirror group journalist had hacked the phones of some 100 celebrities every day and that 109 stories had been published about just seven claimants. On 21 May 2015, damages totalling nearly £1.25m were awarded to eight people as the result of phone hacking by Mirror Group journalists, including actress Sadie Frost (£260,000) and ex-footballer Paul Gascoigne (£188,250). Other damages recipients included soap opera actors Shane Richie (£155,000), Shobna Gulati (£117,500) and Lucy Benjamin (real name Lucy Taggart, £157,250), as well as BBC creative director Alan Yentob (£85,000), TV producer Robert Ashworth (former husband of Coronation Street actress Tracy Shaw, £201,250) and flight attendant Lauren Alcorn (former girlfriend of footballer Rio Ferdinand, £72,500). The Mirror Group said it would consider whether to seek permission to appeal against the size of the damages, but increased the money allocated to deal with phone hacking claims from £12 million to £28 million.

On 15 December 2023, Prince Harry, Duke of Sussex was awarded £140,600 by the High Court in damages against Mirror Group Newspapers after 15 out of 33 sample articles in his claim against MGN were ruled as being the product of phone hacking or other unlawful information gathering.

== Operations ==
=== Newspapers ===
Reach plc's printing division, Reach Printing Services, is located at three sites throughout the UK, printing and distributing thirty-six major newspapers for the UK, including the Daily Mirror and Sunday Mirror, the Sunday People, the Daily Record and Edinburgh Live (in Scotland), and other contract titles, including for the Guardian Media Group. Reach plc also owns a number of local titles in Northern England, Surrey and Berkshire, after acquiring them from Guardian Media Group in 2010.

=== Digital ===
In 2013, Trinity Mirror launched the content websites UsVsTh3m and Ampp3d on an experimental basis. UsVsTh3m was a website similar to BuzzFeed focused on quizzes and games, edited by B3ta founder Rob Manuel and running on the Tumblr platform. Ampp3d focused on data journalism and used the WordPress platform. Both websites were closed down in 2015.

In 2024, Reach launched a Studio team, a division incorporating editorial and commercial multimedia content to audiences and advertising partners, and, in 2025, Reach launched a variety of new standalone digital brands, such as All Out Gaming, All Out Rugby League and All Out Football. Reach have expanded into direct sales with the OK! Beauty Box cosmetic product subscription service and with ecommerce site Yimbly, which sells general goods and homewares.
