= Rail Heritage Trust of New Zealand =

New Zealand charitable trust

- Established: 1 October 1991 (35 years ago)
- Types: charitable trust
- Headquarters: Wellington Railway Station
- Revenue: 73,100 New Zealand dollar (2009)
- Total Assets: 269,252 New Zealand dollar (2009)
- Employees: 4 (2013)
- Website: railheritage.org.nz

The Rail Heritage Trust of New Zealand (RHTNZ) is a charitable trust established in October 1991. Headquartered at the Railway Offices, Wellington Railway Station, the trust was established at the same time New Zealand Railways Corporation was being split into New Zealand Rail Limited (which would own all the rail, ferry and network operations of the corporation) and the corporation itself (which was to dispose of remaining assets while holding onto the land beneath the railway network).

The Trust's stated purposes are to:

- encourage and support the conservation, protection and maintenance of historically significant railway buildings, structures, precincts and relics in New Zealand (collectively described as the "National Rail Heritage Collection")
- support their continued productive use
- raise funds for that conservation work
- maintain and administer the Rail Heritage Register, which classifies and describes the Collection.

== Trust establishment ==
The Trust was constituted by a deed of trust dated 27 September 1991 and incorporated under the Charitable Trusts Act 1957 on 1 October 1991. Its founding trustees were Timothy Brian Samuel Carr (Executive Manager, Property, New Zealand Rail Ltd), Michael John Culliford (National Projects Manager, New Zealand Railways Corporation) and Athol Euan McQueen (General Manager, Queen Elizabeth II National Trust), with Colin Robert Perfect (Manager, Buildings Management, New Zealand Rail Ltd) and Geoffrey Frederick Whitehead (Director, New Zealand Historic Places Trust) also named to the initial Board.

Under the original deed, New Zealand Rail Limited, the New Zealand Railways Corporation and the New Zealand Historic Places Trust each held a standing right to nominate representatives to the Board, a structure that persisted, with adjustments, through subsequent amendments to the deed. Former New Zealand Railways Corporation executive Euan McQueen, who helped form the trust, was chair from 1991 until at least 2008, and press coverage places him in the role until 2012.

McQueen, who had retired from NZR in 1988, had become concerned that with privatisation, historic assets would be lost. During his tenure McQueen personally worked on restoration projects including the Wingatui station and signal box south of Dunedin, the Moana railway precinct on the West Coast, and the Greytown Goods Shed in the Wairarapa. As Tranz Rail disposed of historic assets during the late 1990s and early 2000s, the Trust picked up a lot of work preserving various stations, rolling stock and many other equipment.

The Trust also administered small grants to local restoration groups during this period; in 1998, for example, it contributed $2,000 towards re-piling and weather-board replacement at the 1897 Opapa railway station near Te Aute, alongside a matching grant from TrustBank.

== Governance ==
The Board's senior administrative role, originally titled Executive Secretary, was renamed Executive Officer in 1994. Mike Mellor held the role by 2008 and was still identified in it in 2010 press coverage. Murray King spoke on the Trust's behalf in 2018 press coverage; by August 2025 he was identified as the Trust's chairman, with Barry O'Donnell serving as executive officer.

King, described in the 2008 trust deed as a transport consultant, had joined the Board as an appointed Trustee by 2006; his chairmanship, confirmed in 2025, caps a tenure of at least two decades. William Prebble, then a Wellington-based product manager at Goodyear & Dunlop Tyres (NZ), joined the Board in 2009 and remains a listed trustee. As of 2026, trustees registered with Charities Services include Bruce Shalders, Murray King, Myles Manihera, Neville Tobin, Kenneth Lankshear and William Prebble. In the 2026 New Year Honours, both Shalders and King were appointed Members of the New Zealand Order of Merit, Shalders "for services to railway heritage" and King "for services to transport, logistics and railway heritage".

== National rail heritage collection ==
=== Buildings and infrastructure ===
The Trust maintains a full register of significant New Zealand rail heritage items considered worthy of retention. This register includes station buildings, bridges, monuments, houses, tunnels and more.

Buildings can also be assigned into one of two categories:

- Category A: Finest buildings in their category
- Category B: Notable buildings

Not every asset in the register is classified in the above categories. A combined listing of rail-related heritage sites published by the Trust, cross-referencing the Trust's own Register against listings held by territorial authorities, Heritage New Zealand Pouhere Taonga, the Department of Conservation and Engineering New Zealand, recorded 342 sites nationwide as of a March 2011 compilation, of which 58 carried a Trust category rating (17 Category A and 41 Category B), with stations, bush and industrial tramways, bridges, and track formations forming the largest groups.

Category and register status do not depend on a structure remaining on its original site. Several listed station buildings have been relocated and retain their classification at their new sites, including Hundalee and Otikerama stations.

==== Buildings owned by the trust ====
While other people or organisations own most buildings and structures on the register, the Trust also owns some properties directly:

- Moana railway station and goods shed.
- Wingatui railway station and signal box - these were gifted to the Trust by KiwiRail, reported in KiwiRail's 2013 annual report.
- Mataura railway station - this was transferred from KiwiRail to Trust ownership on 28 August 2025, alongside an increase in KiwiRail's annual funding contribution to the Trust from $125,000 to $500,000.

=== Heritage rolling stock ===
The Rail Heritage Trust pioneered the concept of "heritage rolling stock" - locomotives and wagons that remain in the Trust's ownership while being leased long-term (often at no cost) to operating heritage groups around New Zealand. In 2025, this included two steam locomotives, one diesel locomotive, four carriages, 180 wagons, one guard's van, and one crane. The rolling stock is in varying states of repair and completeness.

Examples under this scheme include:

- Steam locomotive W 192 — transferred to the Trust in 1993 and currently operated by the Canterbury Railway Society at Ferrymead.
- Guard's van F 678 — leased by the Trust to the Feilding and District Steam Rail Society and later to the Silver Stream Railway.
- Freight wagon La 19034 — moved from Steam Incorporated at Paekakariki to the restored Greytown Goods Shed in 2020.

Because items remain owned by the trust, they can be transferred when a group closes or no longer needs the item. Examples include:

- Cattle wagon T 199 was transferred to the National Railway Museum of New Zealand in 2014 from a defunct collection at Waverley.
- Several items formerly held by the Ohai Railway Board Heritage Trust passed to Lumsden Heritage Trust and Waimea Plains Railway after that collection was dispersed from 2014.

KiwiRail has also periodically gifted retired equipment directly into the scheme, as with the shunting locomotive TR 56, gifted to the Trust on its retirement in 2022 for use by Silver Stream Railway.

=== Rail heritage trust restoration award ===
Since at least 1994 the Trust has presented an annual Restoration Award to heritage groups for restoration work carried out "accurately and faithfully" on railway buildings or equipment. The inaugural award, in 1994, went to Main Trunk Rail Ohakune for its restoration of the Ohakune locomotive turntable and station building.

Later recipients have included:

- Pleasant Point Railway, for a restored ganger's hut (2013);
- Clyde railway station restoration, led by the Central Otago District Council, Promote Dunstan and a local working group (2017);
- Waitahuna railway station (2025); and,
- Dunedin Tunnels Trail Trust and Dunedin City Council (2026), presented through the Federation of Rail Organisations of New Zealand (FRONZ) awards, which the Trust co-sponsors.

== Funding ==
The Trust is funded through a combination of its own fundraising, philanthropic and lottery grants secured by partner groups for individual projects, and a direct annual contribution from KiwiRail. Per its Charities Services filings, the Trust's reported annual income has ranged from roughly $103,000 to $217,000 between 2017 and 2025, with expenditure broadly tracking income and occasionally exceeding it. In August 2025, the Minister for Rail, Winston Peters, announced that KiwiRail's annual funding contribution to the Trust would increase from $125,000 to $500,000, specifically to fund the restoration of significant heritage buildings; the 1921 Mataura railway station, transferred into Trust ownership the same day, was the first project to benefit from the increase.

Individual restoration projects have historically also drawn on Lottery Grants Board funding, local authority contributions and public appeals, as in the decade-long, roughly $90,000 restoration of Clyde railway station and the volunteer-driven restoration of Plimmerton railway station.

== Building losses ==
Listing by the Trust, or by Heritage New Zealand, does not guarantee a building's survival, since the Trust has no statutory power to prevent demolition of privately or council-owned structures. Examples of losses include:

- The former Ashburton railway station was the subject of a sustained but ultimately unsuccessful campaign by the Ashburton Heritage Trust to prevent its demolition; despite being listed by both the local council and the Historic Places Trust, and an agreed sale price of $580,000 that the campaign could not raise, the station building was demolished in 2013. The 1917 bowstring-truss footbridge survives and remains listed.
- Christchurch railway station was demolished in 2012 not through any failure of preservation effort but as a result of structural damage sustained in the 2011 Christchurch earthquake.

== See also ==
- Railway preservation in New Zealand
