= List of historic places in Gore District =

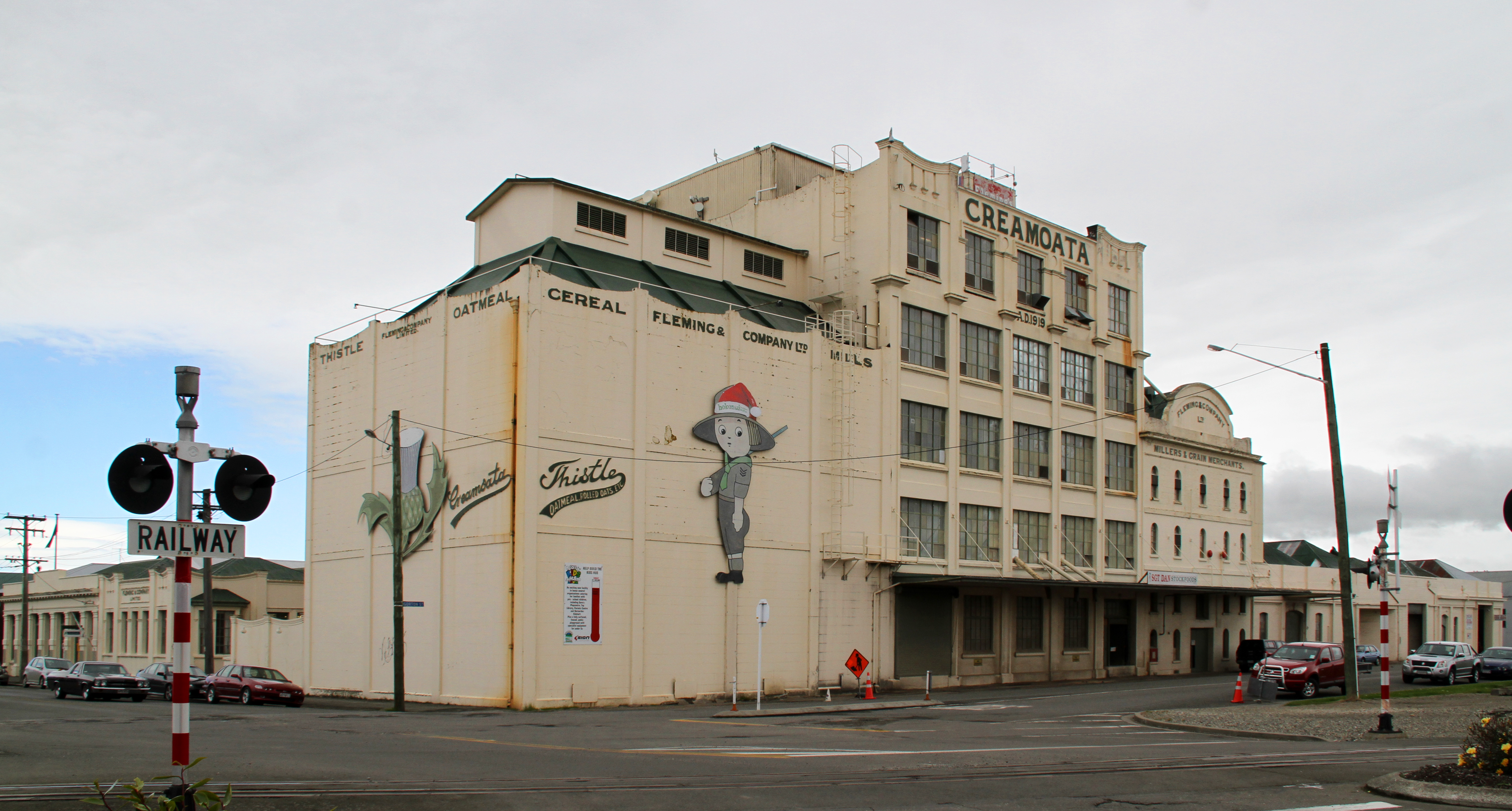
The Fleming's Creamoata Mill complex, a Category 1 historic place in Gore

The Gore District is a territorial authority in eastern Southland, on the South Island of New Zealand. The region was first settled by the Māori. European occupation began in the early 1850s, alongside the spread of sheep ranching. The town of Gore was founded in 1862, but the area did not see large-scale growth until the 1890s and 1900s, following railway expansion into the region. The boroughs of Gore and Mataura were united into the Gore District following nationwide local government reforms in 1989. Despite an agricultural downturn and population decline in the late 20th century, the area remains strongly agrarian, with dairying and sheep farming remaining vital local industries, especially following an upturn of agricultural growth across Southland in the 1990s.

Heritage New Zealand classification of sites on the New Zealand Heritage List / Rārangi Kōrero, in accordance with the Heritage New Zealand Pouhere Taonga Act 2014, distinguishes between Category 1 ("places of special or outstanding historical or cultural significance") and Category 2 ("places of historic or cultural significance"). Other categories exist, such as ones marking locations notable to local Māori heritage, but none of these are located within Gore district. Six locations in the district are listed on the New Zealand Heritage List. Two sites are within the town of Gore itself, three are in Mataura, and one (Willowbank Railway Windmill and Water Tank) is in Willowbank, a rural locality to the northwest of Gore.

== Sites ==
List of historic places in Gore District
| Name | Classification | Location | Constructed | Registered | List number | Notes | Image | Ref. |
|---|---|---|---|---|---|---|---|---|
| Gore Presbyterian Church (former) | Category 2 | 6 Rock Street, East Gore, Gore | 1880 | 2013 | 2530 | Timber church designed for East Gore by architect Robert Lawson. Additions, including a session house, were constructed by William Sharp in 1892. During the early 1960s, the church saw large-scale repairs and the addition of a new hall. It closed in 1995. Repairs were made to the church in the 2010s, and the building was repurposed as an art and printmaking studio. | A black and white photo of the East Gore Presbyterian church | |
| Willowbank Railway Windmill and Water Tank | Category 1 | Waikaka Road, Willowbank | 1911 | 2012 | 2553 | The only railway windmill in New Zealand to be preserved on location alongside its own water tank. It was installed in 1911 for the Willowbank station of the Waikaka Branch line. A new tank was added in 1933. Although the station closed in 1962, the windmill was preserved, and underwent repairs in 1984. The fan has been removed multiple times since to allow for repairs to storm damage. | | |
| Clematis Cottage | Category 2 | 68 Kana Street, Mataura | 1882 | 1995 | 7287 | One of the last remaining unmodified Victorian era cottages in Mataura; now used as a museum, owned by the Mataura Historical Society. | | |
| Bank of New Zealand (former) | Category 2 | 90–92 Kana Street, Mataura | 1892–1893 | 1995 | 7300 | Two-story brick and stucco building in Italianate architectural style, designed by R. W. England. The building was constructed twenty years after the Bank of New Zealand's initial expansion in Mataura as its third outlet in Southland, and operated until the decline of business in the town in the 1970s. | | |
| Mataura Railway Station (former) | Category 2 | Main Street, Mataura | 1921 | 1996 | 7345 | Former passenger station of the Main South Line. An earlier station was built at the spot in 1880, but burnt down in 1920. A new station, designed by George Alexander Troup, was built the following year. It is still in use as a freight station. | Photograph of Mataura Railway Station in 2024 | |
| Fleming's Creamoata Mill complex | Category 1 | 41–43 Mersey Street, Gore | 1892 | 2000 | 7470 | One of two remaining commercial oat mills in New Zealand. Its earliest portions date to the late Victorian era, with various 20th century additions creating an industrial "pastiche". The mill saw rapid expansion following the 1918 creation and subsequent popularity of Creamoata, once a ubiquitous breakfast food in New Zealand. Although the mill was closed in 2000, the Creamoata mascot ("Sergeant Dan") is still displayed on the building. | A photo of the Creamoata Mill complex in Gore | |
