= Cal Henderson =

British computer programmer and author

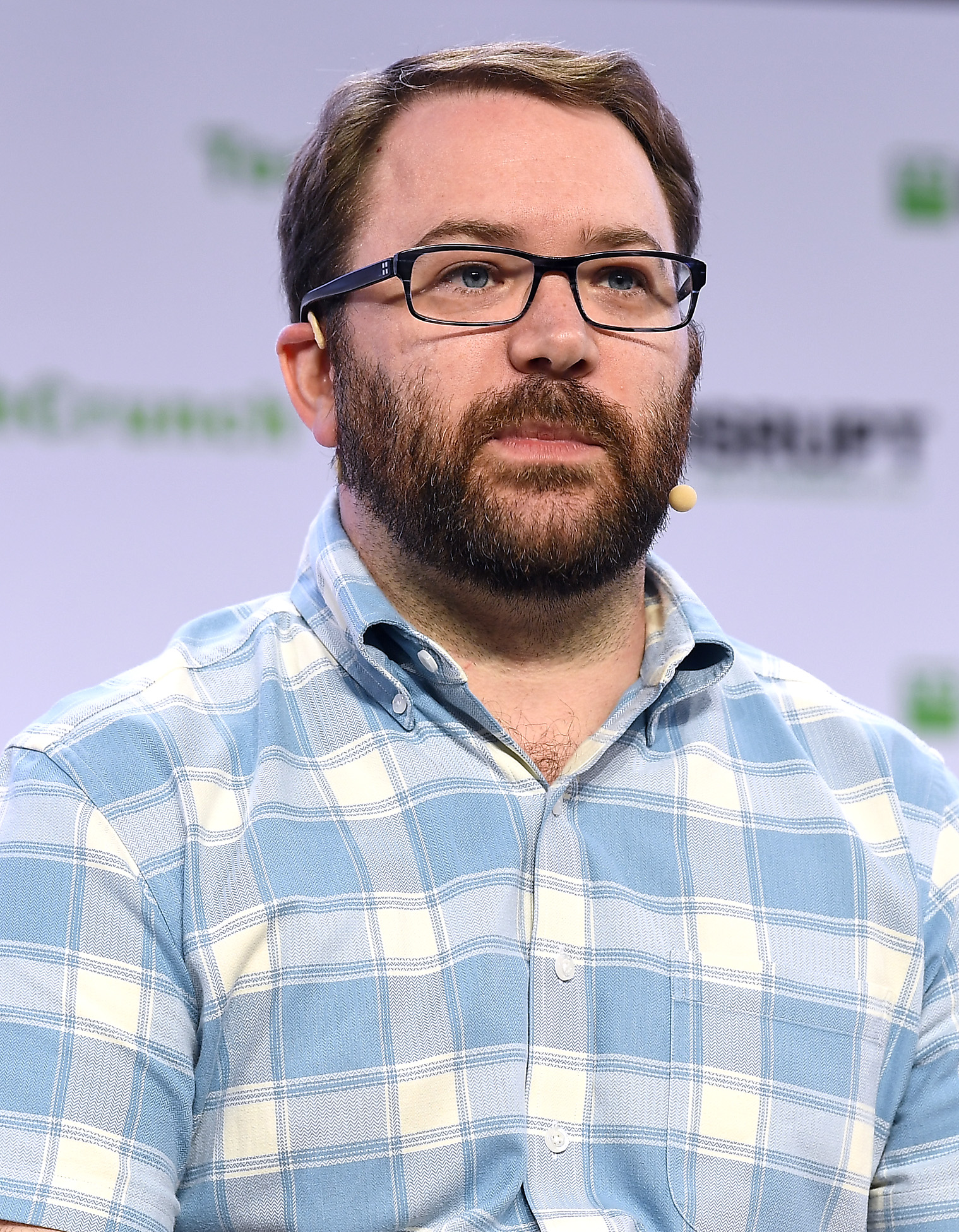
- Henderson in 2019
- Born: Callum James Henderson-Begg; 17 January 1981 (age 45)
- Citizenship: United Kingdom
- Occupations: Computer programmer, author

Callum James Henderson-Begg (born 17 January 1981), known as Cal Henderson, is a British computer programmer and author based in San Francisco.

== Education ==
Henderson attended Sharnbrook Upper School and Community College, and Birmingham City University where he graduated with a degree in software engineering in 2002.

== Career ==
Henderson is best known as the co-founder and chief technology officer at Slack, as well as co-owning and developing the online creative community B3ta with Denise Wilton and Rob Manuel; being the chief software architect for the photo-sharing application Flickr (originally working for Ludicorp and then Yahoo); and writing the book Building Scalable Web Sites for O'Reilly Media.

He has also worked for EMAP as their technical director of special web projects and is responsible for writing City Creator among many other websites, services and desktop applications. Cal was the co-founder and VP of engineering at Tiny Speck, the company whose internal tool transitioned into Slack.

Henderson's connection to Stewart Butterfield and Slack began through a game developed by Butterfield's first company, Ludicorp, called Game Neverending. He ran a fan website dedicated to the game and broke into an internal Ludicorp mailing list. Instead of repercussions, Butterfield hired Henderson to work for his company.

== Personal life ==
Henderson is colour blind, and has worked on applications to make the web more accessible to the colour blind. He is also a frequent contributor to open-source software projects and runs a number of utility websites, such as Unicodey, to make certain programming tasks easier.

== Politics ==
In August 2022, Henderson contributed $50,000 to The Next 50, a liberal political action committee (PAC).
