= Weebl and Bob =

Animated cartoon series by Jonti Picking and Chris Vick

- A still from the first Weebl and Bob cartoon, "pie"
- Created by: Jonti Picking
- Written by: Jonti Picking; Chris Vick; Sarah Darling; David Kirkham
- Voices of: Jonti Picking; Sarah Darling; Chris Vick

Production
- Animators: Jonti Picking; Nathan Malone

Original release
- Release: 6 June 2002

The everyday happenings of Weebl and sometimes Weebl's friend, Bob (best known as Weebl and Bob, and renamed Wobbl and Bob for its DVD release) is a British cartoon series created by Jonti Picking and co-scripted by Chris Vick. It revolves around a "grammatically challenged weeble" and his friend Bob and their quest for pie.

== Description ==
=== Main summary ===
The two main characters Weebl and Bob are best friends, but prone to harassing and insulting each other. Both are egg-shaped creatures with wide mouths that split their heads in half, and move by rolling, hopping or swaying back and forth. They mutter and 'talk' in a way largely unintelligible to viewers while perfectly understood by one another and other characters, with visible speech balloons captioning their dialogue. Weebl is the larger of the two; it is revealed that Bob's small stature is due to a cheese overdose in the 1980s. Many of their stories are centered around their love of pie, a devotion shared by most of the other characters in their world—these episodes generally depict one of their several (often failed) attempts to obtain it. Some episodes are a vehicle to introduce a new character into the storyline, while others are parodies of cultural phenomena, such as Hello Kitty, Japanese karate and ninja movies, '80s anti-drug documentaries, Michael Moore's documentary film Fahrenheit 9/11, Kill Bill, the crime drama CSI: Miami, the iPod "silhouette" ad campaign, the MTV show Pimp My Ride, the game show The Krypton Factor, Mel Brooks' History of the World, Part I, video games such as Portal, Final Fantasy VII and Minecraft, the Academy Awards and even retailers such as PC World ('Pissy Werld' in the show), IKEA (or 'PIKEA') and Matalan ('Catalan').

=== History ===
The first episode, "Pie", was uploaded by Picking on 6 June 2002. By February 2007, more than 120 episodes had been released, together with 6 MTV-only episodes, 1 DVD-only cartoon, and an unofficial 30th birthday animation. Typical episodes are about two minutes in length and require three days of production time. The majority of episodes are animated by Weebl, whilst some recent episodes are animated by Nathan Malone, aka ZekeySpaceyLizard. The 100th web-released episode, which is a few minutes longer than normal cartoons, came out 10 January 2006.

Along with the normal episodes of Weebl and Bob, a few special feature episodes have been created by Weebl and Skoo in which Bob narrates a story. These are very sketchy as if they were hand-drawn and "animated" by Bob himself. There are also a few episodes that don't feature Weebl and Bob characters at all, made by Skoo alone. A single episode titled "Asshat" was created (and "buggered up" by, among many things, turning Bob into a weird Scooby-Doo caricature) by Picking's friend Rob Manuel, founder of b3ta. Three other guest-animated episodes include "Merchandise", "Birthday Wishes" and "Thirty" (the latter two made in celebration of Jonti Picking's birthday on 17 May).

Weebl's production company Sumo Dojo worked on the Anchor Spreadable adverts in the UK. They were also involved in the release of the first year of Weebl and Bob on DVD in late 2004. The DVD includes a documentary narrated by Brian Blessed and an exclusive episode.

A related Flash game, titled Ultimate Pie Theft, was released in September 2006. It is a remake of the popular video game Pac-Man, except the player controls Wee Bull, who attempts to steal all of the pies belonging to Weebl, Bob, Hairy Lee and Chris the Ninja Pirate Mushroom. While doing so, the characters will continuously say one-liners such as "Nooooo! Not the pie!!", and "Why aren't I eating pies when I move?".

=== Episode structure ===
The two main characters appear exclusively in the first episode, and most of the later episodes. The cartoon is minimalistic in style: it is presented on a plain magenta background, and the characters are white with dark grey outlines. Most of the episodes – usually the more recent cartoons – begin with Weebl singing a short song, usually about pie, his main love in life (an example of this "This is a song/a song about pie/hope I get some before I die..."). Bob moves on and off by rolling and remains typically to the right of the animation pane.

Both characters talk, but their voices are usually unintelligible. Picking achieves the sound by speaking without the use of his tongue, and constantly changing the speed of the audio recording; speech balloons are provided. In fact, in the episodes "Asshat" and "Stains", it is implied that this is the only reason they can understand each other. This speech is generally punctuated, but capitals are not used, correct grammar and syntax are rarely employed (e.g. "when come back bring pie!"), and the speech bubbles are occasionally entirely inaccurate; another feature is the occasional addition of an 's' to nouns or verbs that do not require one (e.g. "beefs come from here", or "I have become a Goths" "Is that rights?").

The episodes are set to music (usually of the dance/electronica genre, though it differs considerably between episodes), with the characters sometimes talking in time to the rhythm. Earlier episodes mainly used songs from Picking's music collection, but nowadays they are usually original pieces (sometimes listed in the credits).

=== Characters ===
==== Weebl Bull ====
Weebl, or Wobbl on MTV due to trademark reasons, is 29 years old ("Factor") and is an egg-shaped character who loves pie to a very unhealthy extent. This is especially apparent as, in a reference to the film American Pie Weebl's other friends aside from Bob are a whale, who has only been shown in "Blockage" and a Weighted Companion Cube (a reference to Portal) only seen in "Cube". Weebl has shown romantic fixation towards Donkey, as well as a-ha's Morten Harket (who "makes [Weebl] moist in [his] special places").

Even though Weebl's name is Weebl Bull, as he is Wee Bull's son, he usually uses the surname Chauncey, probably because he hates his father (despite this, however, he has been credited as Weebl Bull in the episode "CSI"), he was also credited as prof. Heinz Weebl Ph.D on "show". He also show signs of being illiterate (though this is probably just to make his ignorance and unintelligence more clear) as he cannot read (as seen in "Record" and "Pastry") and, according to Bob, can only spell "sign" and "beefs" ("Pikea"). A little while after Bob made his blog, Weebl made his blog.

Weebl can be immature and arrogant in most parts, as in the cartoon "Team Laser Explosion 3" he boasted what a hero he was by accusing postmen of being evil, and also being apparently stubborn, he insisted on changing the team logo because it didn't have pictures of him looking hot and sexy. He has at least 5 hats (revealed in "Pastry"). Also he is ignorant to listen to Bob such as in the episode 'snails' where he shows that he doesn't listen to Bob or let him finish his sentences. To add to that he has been in and caused Bob to go to prison with his Paris Hilton impression as shown in episode "Bird"

His last name was not revealed till the episode 'CSI', in which a set of opening credits reveal it, though a smart fan could have deduced it from Weebl's father's name, Wee Bull, or from a supposed e-mail with the subject "Son. We need to talk. Love Wee Bull".

In various episodes Weebl states that he cannot move, unlike Bob who rolls or hops to get to places. He can only be seen rolling in the Wobbl and Bob DVD, during the cutscenes when a category is selected in the menu screen. Otherwise, it remains a mystery of how he moves, although Bob uses methods of transport to carry him around in several episodes, it says that Weebl invented sheep especially on the episode 'gravy'.

==== Bob Bobertson ====
Bob is Weebl's friend, and producer of many Flash animations throughout the series. He looks like Weebl except for the fact that he is smaller. Like Weebl, he also likes pie – and 'butters' [sic] (see episode "Pikea"). His last name, Bobertson, is revealed in "Show," and is shown again in "Team Laser Explosion 3", when Weebl draws their new logo on the back of Bob's will. His last name can also be seen in the credits of some of the "made by Bob" cartoons and on his blog. Bob also became a goth (because he was depressed about not having pie, and he found the cloak and the wig in a ditch) in the episode "Gothic" but that lasted only for that episode. During that episode he called himself "Bob... Lord of the Dark... things".

Bob seems to show a fear of bees and, after Weebl's bath water destroyed his computer in "Upgrade", a fear of liquid. He is also allergic to cat fur ("Dan"), as characterized by pink spots, red eyes, and huge swelling lumps on his head. His new computer is apparently possessed by – and has affiliations with – the supernatural, as it gets demonic messages, shoots blood from the screen, makes groaning noises and came with an Angel of Death and an evil lamp (the reason being that 'Pissy Werld', the place from which it was purchased, is owned by a demon).

In the episode "Joust", we are told that Bob was once married, to a "Millionaire Supermodel Scientist," but Weebl destroyed the marriage with his constant demands for a duel. We are also told that his wife lost a toe in the duel, and that Bob retained the "zombie toe," until that, too, left him. Bob also frequently visits a book club, and it is evident that he has not yet reached puberty ("Pikea 2"). Bob also knows nothing about farming emu.

Bob often questions and pities Weebl's strange ways, though Bob himself does sometimes show a perverted nature, as seen on in "Pieku", when he admitted he wasn't wearing pants, and said "lo! meet my penis!" This, however, turned out to actually be "pianist", as Weebl misheard Bob. Bob is also known to be slightly more intelligent than Weebl, often correcting or lecturing him. He dislikes bananas, shown in "Romantic".

==== Regulars ====
These characters have appeared regularly throughout the series, and are usually older than the rest of the cast.

- Chris the Ninja Pirate – A mushroom who is an expert at martial arts, and who speaks and acts like a cross between a ninja and a pirate, and has been known to say "Shiver-me shurikens!". First appeared in "Yarr". He wears an eyepatch in normal clothing, but has been wearing a black ninja costume (which Sensei Carrotu thinks is "very sexy") in recent episodes. After Donkey's death, he went mad with grief, writing "why?" on the walls in feces and sculpting a model of Donkey out of his earwax. Now, whilst he seems to have mostly gotten over the death of his wife, he still apparently drinks a lot and thus his one visible eye has bags under it. He moved on in 'Begins', the latest Weebl and Bob, where he fell in love with Weebl's mother, and was set to marry her, but ended up wedding Donkey's alternate dimensional self.
- Donkey – Recently deceased spouse to Chris the Ninja Pirate who resembles a rocking horse. Was originally Weebl's girlfriend until Chris stole her from him in "Wrong". Her death was shown in the 100th episode after suffering from a serious accident as a result of both herself and Chris, in his words, "doing position 97 near a porthole". In the same episode, Donkey said her only word: "minge" (about which Weebl and Bob speculate on what she could have meant, à la Citizen Kane; however, Chris proves that she just "likes to swear like a fishwife"). Her demise is more somber than the comedic deaths of some of the other characters, leading to a somewhat depressing funeral and, in "Intervention", making Chris go insane with grief. Two days after episode 100 was released, Weebls-Stuff.com brought out a special T-shirt dedicated to Donkey reading "Donkey 2002–2006. Rock in peace". Donkey has since been listed as a cast member in the credits of "Goo-lien", although she did not appear in the episode. She makes a return in Body, just her bottom part appears though, and Weebl's Mummy said that she chewed off Donkey's head to make room.
- Hairy Lee – A hairy version of Weebl and an expert on hypnotism. He is probably a caveman, which would explain the hair and the fact he usually talks in grunts. First appeared in "Hairy". Known as "Baldie Lee" in the 1980s prior to an overdose on cheese. However, prior to and following this event, he looked about the same. He may have just seemed bald in comparison with Weebl and Bob's mullets, which were inexplicably destroyed near the end of the episode. This could be the reason as to why his name may be a play on words of the British soft cheese brand "Dairylea". He played a female dancer's "Left Bum Cheek" in DJ Pie Safety's music video in "DJ".
- Wee Bull – A bull, also Weebl's arch-nemesis, and, revealed in "Bull", his father. His name is a play on the word Weebl. Always seems to win every battle – apart from a Christmas short – against Weebl, who states "damn you wee bull. you win this time". Popular with the ladies. Possibly descended from Wee Mammoth, he always talks by snorting. No words are formed, but everyone seems to understand him, much like Weebl's and Bob's slurred speech. He still loves Weebl however, and wants to talk, according to the subject line of an E-Mail he sends in the recent episode 'Email' ("Son, We Need To Talk. Love Wee Bull").
- The Monkey – A monkey bought by Weebl in "Cleaner". He is best known for his posh accent and pooping everywhere. In the episodes "Anywhere" and "Anyhoo", he boasts that he can go anywhere and is unstoppable, but in "Anyhoo" Bob is correct when he suggests surrounding monkey with toilets, as that is what he notorious for not using. This could be in relation to the fact that monkeys cannot be house-trained. Major appearances include "Anywhere" "Anyhoo" and "Team Laser Explosion" (in the latter, he plays the main villains). He has been regularly shown wearing a large foam "We am de best" cowboy hat. Monkey appears as the Grim Reaper (in his own words "Death, stealer of pie") in the episodes "Art" and "Halloween". He also portrays Santa Claus in an advent calendar short, as well as all the known villains of Team Laser Explosion. It was revealed in "History 1" that his ability to speak English was caused by touching a large black monolith with his tail (a reference to the film 2001: A Space Odyssey). However, since the "History" series isn't necessarily part of the show's continuity, this could be false.
- The Jams – Jam jars who try to overthrow the government and fight for freedom, though not very successfully. First appeared in "Wrong", in which they distracted Weebl in order for Chris the Ninja Pirate to steal Donkey. Probably based on the popular band The KLF (also known as the Justified Ancients of Mu Mu — the JAMs), as they share the name and are a tad revolutionary, spreading political messages through music.

==== Major and popular characters ====
These characters shown below have been seen semi-regularly or been praised by fans.

- Angry Paul – Bob's spoiled child, and the only character who dislikes pie. Blew up "like a little firework" after drinking too much of his Sunny Delight in "Angry". Now he lives in a secret lab – located at 21 Wigmore Street – inside a strange machine that keeps him alive.
- Angry Pierre – Bob's cousin and the French version of Angry Paul. Died from his family curse (spilling Orangina) in "Bob's Week in France Part 5".
- The Mysterious Chicken – A hovering roast chicken who dons sunglasses and has the mysterious powers of dancing and hiding things. He appeared mostly in older episodes but was seen recently as an employee of "Pissy Werld" and in the episode "Changed", and the latest episode "L.O.S.T". He sometimes is mistaken for a turkey, but then says I'm not a turkey, I'm a chicken. His parallel universe version is known as "obvious chicken".
- Hand Boy – A talking hand, who was once involved with the police to help stop The Jams' protest. Beat off the monkey in the MTV episode "Sex 1".
- Shopkeep – Northern-accented shopkeeper who appears in almost any shop that Weebl or Bob enter, although it is debatable whether all the appearances are the same person, or just happen to look and sound the same. Sports a top hat, a large moustache and square glasses. Appears in non shop-related roles in the episodes "100", and "The history of the world according to Weebl and Bob – the Industrial Revolution", pulling the "porta-door 2000" and inventing the steam engine respectively.
- Clive – TV face. Like Shopkeep, he has appeared in various roles. He speaks with an American accent (ironically, most Americans consider Clive a distinctly British name). Weebl referred to him as James in "Chat", a possible reference to Clive James.
- Kevin – French stripper who stalks Bob, and stole one of Bob's kidneys in "Bob's Week in France Part 3". Also claims he has "a big willy" and says he "loves" Bob. Disguised himself as a twig in "Awards". Despite only having been seen three times, he is usually mentioned by Weebl (who he apparently knows) to annoy/ridicule Bob, as seen in "Sweet".
- Vibro Egg – Father to the Mysterious Chicken, the Vibro Egg looks like a fried egg. He is self-proclaimed "destroyer of worlds" and "breaker of hearts". He first appeared in the episode "Egg," where he was struck by lightning (it's dangerous to hold meetings near electric pylons). He returned in "Joust 2" as the blind (He doesn't know why, it was a "mysterious accident", but in reality was the lightning.) "Eggsy Bit" (a nod to Pimp My Ride host/rapper Xzibit), where he helped to 'pimp' Bob's car (improve it), sporting a tag reading "Jim fixed it for me" around his neck. Is seriously injured (and possibly killed) by Hairy Jam in the same episode.
- Bubble Boy – An odd-looking boy who appeared in "Germs" and lived in a bouncing bubble. He died by flooding his bubble with his own urine and subsequently drowning. (He refused to leave his bubble even while it was flooding because he was afraid of "the germs !! ") Luckily, he lived for a Weebl and Bob advent calendar cartoon, but was still bacteriophobic. He later appeared in a Christmas short. Bubble Boy is a reference to Blair Hayes' film, Bubble Boy, a comedy about a young man who was born without an immune system and has to live in a large plastic bubble to protect himself from germs.
- Apple Dave – A very strange rock star with the head of an apple. He likes to "make your mum horny". He usually makes an appearance in order for Weebl to avoid answering a difficult/unexplanatory question. Apparently, Bob has no idea who he is, Weebl's only spoke of him in the first place to change the subject of why he didn't have a tan where a bikini top would be.
- The Wasp aka George W. Buzz – A wasp who originally appeared in the episode "Sweet". Attempted to steal Weebl's sugar lump posing first as Weebl and Bob's neighbour, then as Bob's uncle, and finally as "a president" of the unnamed country in which the animation is set.
- The Childs – Several Weeblesque children who appear regularly in the Weebl and Bob universe. They will follow whatever Hairy Lee says due to his powers of hypnotism. (As Weebl says, "Kids will do anything for Hairy Lee!" - a reference to the ads for Dairylea cheese, which assert that "Kids will do anything for Dairylea!")
- DJ Pie Safety – A hip-hop rapper/DJ who teaches pie safety through song, such as waiting for the pie to cool down before eating it. A human character, portrayed by Jonti Picking himself.

==== Others ====
These characters have only appeared in just one or a few episodes.

- Hairy Jam – Jam jar mechanic, also called "Damaged Jam" in the Goovies. However, he is not good at his job, as his lack of mechanical skills and carelessness with tools always seem to get his customers killed/seriously injured. Does not seem to take interest in the other Jams' rebellion against the government, but has an obsession with baked beans, which, he claims, "everyone loves". Like Hairy Lee, he is hairy all over. First appeared in "Band", where he killed off three Jams, stating that he is high. Believes that hitting a car repeatedly with a hammer and filling it with beans gives the best cleaning results. Last seen as an employee at Pissy Werld (wearing a Tesco Value label), along with Shopkeep, The Mysterious Chicken and The Captain of the Farm.
- Elvis – A mysterious character who is two thirds donkey while the last third is "mostly Elvis". Has appeared in two episodes, "Elvis" and "Awards". Likes to say "uh-huh-huh!" Weebl finds himself physically attracted to Elvis, except for the face.
- Ladies – Female Weeblesque characters, only a bit smaller (bigger than Bob, though). They like shoes, pretty dresses, and Wee Bull (but mostly shoes). As for Weebl, they think he's a pig.
- Banana – An enormous hallucinational, floating, sentient banana, usually appearing when other characters are under the influence of mind-altering substances. The Banana has commanded Weebl to do things against his will, often with comedic consequences.
- The Captain of the Farm – A fly who claims to be the captain of a farm floating on water. His first appearance was in "Captain", He was previously angered when Weebl refused to recognize his authority. He has a sidekick called Horse (although the name could be false), who has a habit of popping up surprisingly from the corner of the screen whenever needed. Likes turd-based foods, as seen in the episode "get well" which is unfortunately a preference not shared by his crew. He was also seen in the episode "upgrade pt2" as an employee in "Pissy Werld".
- The Lemon Curds – The law enforcement responsible for stopping The Jams' revolts. Their motto is "to protect and serve", despite the fact that it is "not very catchy" and (their words) "prefer the scout one".
- Hank – A talking pear who was hired to design the new Team Laser Explosion logo in "Team Laser Explosion 3". However, his design was rejected by Weebl because he made Weebl feel bad, so Weebl's own less-than-professional logo was used (however, Hank's design was used as the TLE logo in "Team Laser Explosion 4", which meant Weebl really liked it). Hank had his second appearance in the next episode, "Get Well," a non-TLE episode. Weebl's criticism makes Hank suicidal, and he tries to kill himself in both of the episodes in which he appears, but he never manages it; the first time he doesn't fall far enough, and the second time his fall is broken by a pie. He was last seen as a mourner at Donkey's funeral. He replaces most of his consonants with a 'bl' sound.
- The Mexican – A sombrero-wearer with a Yorkshire accent who calls Bob a "daft bugger" in the first "Bob's Week in France" episode. Won the award for best pie lover in the world "...ever!". He also worked on Chris's ship on Christmas 4. He is the only character other than Weebl who calls Bob "wanker".
- Mr. Teeth – Appeared in the episode "Wedding" in which he was the fake vicar for Chris the Ninja Pirate and Donkey's wedding, and in "Funeral", leading Donkey's memorial service. He is actually a dentist.
- Sensei Carrotu – Chris the Ninja Pirate's former martial arts trainer, a floating carrot with a sweatband above his eyes. First appeared (and died in a Dance Dance Revolution accident) in "Quest". He apparently likes to see Chris the Ninja Pirate in his ninja suit, as he claims that it is "very sexy".
- Holy Strawberry – The Jams' deceased mother. She is shown in the episode "Hostage".
- Corn Guy – One of the people involved in the "Pikea" traffic jam. He was turned into popcorn later in the episode when the sun came out.
- Blind Date – The blind date that Weebl arranges for Bob to cheer him up in "Date". In the episode, Bob is not aware that his blind date is a literal blind date (who is dyslexic), until he meets his date. Blind Date is one of the few characters who opens their mouths while speaking.
- Thor – Also evidence of the Blind Date's dyslexia, as the visually impaired typically use guide dogs ["dog" being "god" backwards].
- Birthday Fairy – A drunken fairy who shows up once a year to wish Jonti a happy birthday. Created by BlueHippo of the Weebl and Bob forums. The Birthday Fairy has appeared in the episodes "Birthday Wishes" and "Thirty".
- Norris – A character in the episode "Record" who cannot be seen, but who keeps track of how many times Weebl has said "toot". A reference to the founder of The Guinness Book of Records, the late Norris McWhirter.
- Cows – Several, identical cows, only appeared in one episode, "Cows". According to Weebl "Cows make the beef". When asked how, he answers he doesn't know, but "maybe, they are magic!". "Beef Magic!" "Moodoo!". As one bit Bob, Weebl told him to "Suck out the poison, quick!"
- Evil Clown – A sinister clown who tells the viewers in an eerie voice to look at his "lovely" hat. He is surprised by the appearance of the banana, who thinks the hat is a fine one.
- Zombito – The remainder of Bob's wife (a toe) after Weebl challenged her to a duel. It now belongs to Hand Boy.
- Pianist – Weebl is shocked when Bob introduces him, but only because he heard "penis" rather than "pianist" (and, indeed, this is what is written in Bob's speech bubble). He can't actually play so he just hums the tune.
- Manager – Appeared in "Upgrade Pt2". He is the demon manager of 'Pissy Werld'. He never speaks, but instead hisses, as wispy smoke comes out of his eyes. All the other employees of Pissy Werld seem to be afraid of him, as they run away when he comes in.
- Donkey Kong – A large, pixelated version of the famous video game character, who happens to be Donkey's father, as revealed in the "Funeral" episode. Weebl and Bob are confused about his species, but Chris confirms that "he doesn't like to talk about it".
- Michael Moore – A large blob animated version of Michael Moore. Appeared at the end of "Politics"; a movie that Bob made for him.
- Stephen Hawking- An animated version of theoretical physicist, Stephen Hawking. His first appearance was in "Balance", when he slid across the floor in his wheelchair once Bob slanted it with his weight. He claims that his brakes "really suck". This is a possible reference to "The Yard", a fan-made parody of the popular British kid's show Thomas the Tank Engine and Friends. Additionally, he had a brief moment of ridicule from Weebl when he started typing rude words on his keyboard ("Poo poo willy bums arses"), random letters, and finally typing "I've wet my pants".
- Barry Scott – Advertising "Cillit Bang Pie Remover" in "Stains" Apparently, he has a "nice shiny tuppence!"
- Cigar Man – Often appears in Bob's cartoons, distinguished by a top hat and a monocle. Often burns people with his cigar (apparently much to his content), as seen in "Ghosts", "Doods" and "Colds".
- The Beggar – Lives in Chris The Ninja Pirate's house. He believes that "owls are made of the bits left over when they make toilet seats".
- The Emailman – Explains, through the gift of song, what the 'e' stands for in 'email'. He looks like Postman Pat, and is one of the only Weebl and Bob characters drawn with colour. Apparently he is "not to be trusted. He's just a disgruntled Postman".
- Sean Harris – Emails Weebl asking for a character with his name to be in the show. His voice is heard offscreen, and Weebl and Bob tell him that he "has problems", after he wet himself "again", no one likes him because "he smells of the wee" and ugly. Could possibly be a reference to the lead singer of British metal band Diamond Head, but this is impossible to verify.
- Weebl and Bob before 1984 – The episode "Cheese" shows Weebl and Bob before 1984. Weebl and Bob were much different in these ways; they both had mullets, Bob was much larger and they were intelligible. Weebl's yo-yo string had broken, and they needed something to do. They called their friend, Baldy Lee, who is Hairy Lee and still has hair, and brings cheese with him, which in the video is shown as a profane item, or a drug. All three of them eat the cheese, and seem fine at first and dance to the Chicken Dance. The next day Weebl and Bob turn into what we know of them today.
- Walrus – The Walrus that Weebl and Bob hit in the episode "Pastry". The only thing he says is "Ooh, me mansacks".
- Hambo – Appears in the Bob cartoons "Hams", "Colds" and "Restrooms", he constantly throws hams at people in order to cure them of their vegetarianism. He has a bandana round his head, possibly meaning his name is a pun on "Rambo".
- Alternate Universe Weebl & Bob – Accessible through the trans-dimensional portal under the stairs. Differentiated from Weebl & Bob by their stylish hats, goatees, mountains of pie, and the fact that their speech is backmasked. Alternate Universe Bob is enrolled in Pastry Assassination classes.
- Dan De Zille – The disembodied head of a real person named Dan De Zille, incarnated as an extraterrestrial rocket ship. This "character" is unique as Dan bid his way onto the episode by ways of an eBay auction, with all profits going to charity. The winning bid was for the generous sum of £1,750 (About $3,500 USD). Dan appears in the appropriately named episode: "Dan"
- Spa Secretary- A female secretary for the spa. She has large breasts that Bob was hiding in. From the toon "Spa".
- Dishonest Jim- He is never to be trusted. from the toon "Snails".
- Hopey McChange-Pants- A politician in the land where Weebl and Bob takes place, inferred to be inclined for hope and change. Weebl doesn't like him, but Bob does. Was on the cover of magazine "Meat-Eaters Monthly". Was revealed to have been elected in the episode "Begins".
- Oldy McDodderington- The candidate running against Hopey McChange-Pants. Is known for being senile, stupid, lying, and wetting himself. Lost to McChange-Pants.
- Mrs. Titty McGee- Old McDodderington's running mate. Has brown hair, wears glasses, and "fun bags".
- Mr. Poop-On-A-Stick- The mascot for Butch Man's Knowledge College.
- Weebl's Mummy- Appears in Petition, buried in concrete and wrapped in chains. She leaves jail, but just her top part. Returns in Body.

==== Team Laser Explosion characters ====
These characters are seen only in the "Team Laser Explosion" episodes.

- Team Laser Explosion – Weebl and Bob's super alter-egos. Have their own Secret Fan Club. Weebl is Captain Laserous Explosion, and Bob is Boy Exploserous Laser. Both wield the much-feared Laser Pelvis Attack belt, which is also available to members of the Secret Fan Club. Their battle cry is "to the skies!".
- Mayor Haggar – The Mayor, who appears as a sprite of Mike Haggar from Final Fight.
- Fire Thunder Squad – Team Laser Explosion's arch enemies. Their members are Captain Thunderous Fire (Monkey) and The Pigeon (a pigeon). Bob believes that their logo is better than that of Team Laser Explosion. Their attacks include the self-explanatory Projectile Fire Breath, The Pigeon's Double Poop combo attack, and very powerful Thunder Hat Wobble attack (which requires the user to be wearing a hat.)
- Sarcasm Stealth Squad – More enemies of Team Laser Explosion, known for filling the town pool with fish heads. Their members are El Sharp Tongue (Monkey again) and A Book (a book about sidekicks). A Book was killed by Weebl the day before its evil retirement. They have a better logo than Team Laser Explosion.
- Apple Squad – Appearing in the fourth Team Laser Explosion episode, this squad of villains references Apple Inc. The villains are Lord iEvil (not surprisingly, Monkey again) and a "tiny, harmless" iPod which can transform into a giant robot (unless the hold button is on). However, they were defeated by Bob's "Giant Denim Pocket Attack" (encasing them in a giant blue denim pocket) causing the robot to scratch. Unfortunately, Lord iEvil couldn't take it back because Weebl removed the warranty sticker, rendering it void.
- Napalm Waitress Force – Referred to by Weebl, but never physically seen, in the first Team Laser Explosion episode, when Bob remarks "We live to serve". Weebl claims, "No, that's Napalm Waitress Force".
- Irony Force 5 – Their job is to make the hunter become the hunted.
- No Depth Perception Crew – Appearing in the fifth installment of Team Laser Explosion, their members include Lord Can't See-a-lot (Monkey) and a pier arcade machine. Notorious for kidnapping the town's cats and placing them in Bonsai trees (Lord Can't See-a-lot believed the trees to be much bigger than they were, and also a lot further away). Foiled by Burly arcade worker man after setting off the anti-tamper device on the pier arcade machine.

==== Goo-ology ====
"Goo-ology" was a series of promotional shorts for Cadbury's Creme Egg, parodying pivotal scenes from cult movies (Pulp Fiction, Raiders of the Lost Ark, Alien and Frankenstein). This was followed by a similar segment entitled "Goo's Got Talent", a parody of Britain's Got Talent in which the winner was determined by a vote on YouTube.

- Creme Eggs – The creme eggs appear in the special creme egg episodes. They often play the bad guys and, as with the ad campaign, show excitement over being 'gooed'.
- Twisted Bar – A monster created from deceased Creme Eggs to celebrate the release of the Creme Egg Twisted Bar.

== Reception ==
Weebl and Bob was "one of the most popular ongoing series" according to The Spokesman-Review in 2006 and the two characters were later dubbed "online animation superstars"

The series was described by The Guardian as follows: "Another British creation Weebl and Bob are two wobbly eggs who like pie. That set-up took the animation through over 100 episodes, onto MTV in a series of licensed indents, and a made for DVD special.", while Screen Rant commented: "The legs on this abstract series about 2 egg things with South Park Canadian style mouths who like pie were impressive. It was just as random and silly, but much more laid back than most other 'random' comedies, with long aired out dialogue scenes, idly mumbling about pie, or other things, sometimes just gibberish. It was funny and full of charm and made for a unique watch as the series continued Weebl and Bob got more ambitious, with the likes of their Sexyback and Portal parodies, as they were forced to compete with rivals from their own website, which was growing in notoriety thanks to a certain animal and a certain fungus..."
