= Robert's Web =

- Starring: Robert Webb
- Country of origin: United Kingdom
- Original language: English
- No. of series: 1
- No. of episodes: 4

Production
- Executive producers: Kenton Allen; Jon Plowman
- Running time: 30 minutes

Original release
- Network: Channel 4
- Release: 26 November – 17 December 2010

Robert's Web is a topical comedy show hosted by Robert Webb, broadcast in 2010. The four-part series offers an "alternative take" at the latest news and happenings from the Internet over the past week, presenting the funniest content and tweets.

== Cast ==
- Robert Webb
- Diane Morgan
- Ben Kewin
- Joe Wilkinson
- Terry Mynott
- Eve Webster

== See also ==
- Rude Tube – a similar television series
- Totally Viral – a similar television series
