= Rude Tube =

British television programme

- Rude Tube Title Card, 2017
- Also known as: Rude(ish) Tube (pre-watershed edition)
- Genre: Clip show
- Presented by: Alex Zane; Matt Kirshen (2008)
- Opening theme: "Trash" by The Whip
- Country of origin: United Kingdom
- No. of series: 11 + Specials
- No. of episodes: 99

Original release
- Network: Channel 4 (2008–2015); E4 (2008–2017)
- Release: 6 February 2008 – 18 July 2017

Rude Tube is a British television programme broadcast on Channel 4 and its sister channel E4. Most of the programme's episodes have been presented by British comedian Alex Zane, who launched the show's pilot episode in February 2008. Comedian Matt Kirshen presented the show's first full series in 2008 on E4. Zane has hosted the show since its 2009 New Year special. Johnny Vegas and Emma Frain have also featured in multiple sketches between clips on episodes hosted by Alex Zane. The pilot episode in February 2008 was followed by a first series which aired from November to December of that year. A Christmas episode followed the series. A New Year episode was broadcast on 3 January 2009. A second series aired across October 2009.

The eleventh and final series debuted on E4 on Tuesday 16 May 2017 with an episode entitled "Animals Assemble". The programme broadcast its last episode on 18 July 2017.

== Format ==
Rude Tube is a clip show with the majority of episodes formatted as a run-down of the "top internet viral videos", usually with either 100 or 50 clips per episode, although the first series presented by Matt Kirshen only had 20 clips per half-hour episode. Episodes are usually interspersed with interview clips with the viral videos' creators and stars.

Most episodes of Rude Tube are themed, with titles including "Animal Madness", "Epic Fails", "Rude Tunes", "Viral Ads", "Utter Pranks", "Extreme Rides", "Daft Stunts", "Rude 'lympics", "Kick-Ass Animals" and "Gods of Geek". New Year special episodes were broadcast in early January from 2009 to 2015. Christmas special episodes were broadcast in December from 2011 to 2015.

A 20-episode spin-off series, Rude(ish) Tube, was first shown on E4 in 2012 and then received an additional series.

== Broadcast history ==
=== Pilot (Channel 4) ===
Rude Tube was first broadcast on Channel 4 as a pilot episode on 6 February 2008, presented by Alex Zane. The pilot attracted 2.5 million viewers, aired in a Friday primetime slot, with a 10.8% share of UK TV viewers.

=== Series 1 (E4) ===
A full series followed later in the year. It was presented by Matt Kirshen and broadcast on Channel 4's free-to-view digital channel E4. The 6-episode series aired from November to December 2008.

=== Series 2–7 and Specials (Channel 4) ===
A special episode entitled Rude Tube 2009 was broadcast on Channel 4 on 2 January 2009, with Alex Zane returning as host. Zane would remain the show's main host for all future Channel 4 episodes. Rude Tube 2009 featured the "top 50 viral video clips on the web" as rated by number of views in 2008. The series was followed by a New Year special, broadcast on 2 January 2009.

A second series, known as Rude Tube III was broadcast on Channel 4 in October 2009 and featured three new 60-minute episodes. The series was followed by the second New Year special, broadcast on 3 January 2010.

A third series, Rude Tube IV commenced in October 2010 and ran for 6 episodes, followed by the third New Year special, broadcast on 7 January 2011. The special episode featured 100 clips, which were a combination of 50 highlights from Rude Tube IV and 50 new clips.

A fourth full series of the show featured eight new episodes and aired on Channel 4 from September to November 2011. This was followed by the first Rude Tube Christmas special – a countdown of 50 Christmas themed clips which aired on Christmas Day at 10pm on Channel 4. The Christmas special was followed by the fourth New Year special, broadcast on 6 January 2012.

A new series of six episodes began in September 2012, with the show's second Christmas special and fifth New Year special splitting the series, which concluded in early 2013. A further 15 episodes were broadcast in 2013, concluding with the third Christmas special on 27 December. A sixth New Year special followed on 3 January 2014. Comedian Johnny Vegas guest starred with Zane as the voice of the "talking computer" on some of the 2012 and 2013 episodes.

=== Rude(ish) Tube (E4) ===
Known as "Rude Tube's little sister", Rude(ish) Tube is a spin-off series featuring clips described as "very cheeky – if a bit less rude". The series is broadcast on E4.

=== Series 8, Specials and move to E4 ===
Rude Tube returned for its eighth series in November 2014. Presented by Alex Zane, the main series premiered on E4 for the first time since series one. Series eight ran from 11 November to 30 December and consisted of eight individually-themed episodes. In addition, two special programmes, Rude Tube Christmas Cracker 2014 and Welcome to 2015 were shown on Channel 4 on 25 December 2014 and 1 January 2015 respectively.

=== Series 9 and Specials ===
The ninth series of Rude Tube debuted on Sunday 2 August 2015 on E4 with an episode entitled 200% Cats – it ran for ten episodes with Zane returning as host. The series was followed by the regular Christmas and New Year specials, broadcast on Channel 4 on 25 December 2015 and 1 January 2016 respectively.

=== Series 10 and Specials ===
The tenth series debuted on E4 on Monday 11 January 2016 with an episode entitled "Daredevils & Dummies". Rude Tube Christmas Cracker 2016 and Welcome To 2017 aired on Channel 4 on 24 and 30 December respectively.

=== Series 11 ===
The eleventh series debuted on E4 on Tuesday 16 May 2017 with an episode entitled "Animals Assemble".

== Episode guide ==
| Series | Year | Episodes | Presenter | Channel | Dates |
|---|---|---|---|---|---|
| Pilot | 2008 | Rude Tube | Alex Zane | Channel 4 | 6 February 2008 |
| Series 1 | 2008 | Pranks and Stunts; Freaky Skills and Geeky Thrills; Celebrity and Wannabe; Naughty and Naked; Animals and Kids; Drink and Drugs | Matt Kirshen | E4 | 5 November to 10 December 2008 |
| Special | 2009 | New Year Special | Alex Zane | Channel 4 | 2 January 2009 |
| Series 2 | 2009 | Heroes and Villains; All Things Weird and Wonderful; Superstars of the Web | Alex Zane | Channel 4 | 9 to 23 October 2009 |
| Special | 2010 | New Year Special | Alex Zane | Channel 4 | 3 January 2010 |
| Series 3 | 2010 | Epic Fails; Animal Madness; Ultimate Champions; Total Stunts; Rude Tunes; Viral Ads | Alex Zane | Channel 4 | 5 October to 7 November 2010 |
| Special | 2011 | Rude Tube 2011 (New Year Special) | Alex Zane | Channel 4 | 7 January 2011 |
| Series 4 | 2011 | Mashed 'n' Mixed; Total Fails; Epic Skills; Utter Pranks; Love Bytes; Ultimate Stunts; Rude Zoo; Extreme Rides | Alex Zane | Channel 4 | 12 September to 9 November 2011 |
| Special | 2011 | Epic Christmas | Alex Zane | Channel 4 | 25 December 2011 |
| Special | 2012 | New Year with Rude Tube 2012 | Alex Zane | Channel 4 | 6 January 2012 |
| Series 5 (part one) | 2012 | Utter Fails; Animal Anarchy; Serious Skills; Daft Stunts | Alex Zane | Channel 4 | 10 September to 2 October 2012 |
| Special | 2012 | Christmas Cracker | Alex Zane | Channel 4 | 25 December 2012 |
| Special | 2013 | Welcome to 2013 | Alex Zane | Channel 4 | 11 January 2013 |
| Series 5 (part two) | 2013 | Totally Mashed; Complete Prankers | Alex Zane | Channel 4 | 17 and 24 January 2013 |
| Series 6 | 2013 | Web Stars; WTF?!?; Rom Dot Com; Dumb and Dangerous; Rude 'lympics; Bad Trips | Alex Zane | Channel 4 | 23 July to 27 August 2013 |
| Series 7 | 2013 | World of Fail; Kick-Ass Animals; Badass Stunts; Mashed Up; Super Pranks; Internet Incredibles; Gods of Geek; Web Celebs | Alex Zane | Channel 4 | 8 September to 27 October 2013 |
| Special | 2013 | Christmas Cracker 2013 | Alex Zane | Channel 4 | 27 December 2013 |
| Special | 2014 | Welcome to 2014 | Alex Zane | Channel 4 | 3 January 2014 |
| Series 8 | 2014 | Planet Fail; Bad Ass Beasts; Viral Idols; Massive Prankers; Fearless & Foolish; World Wide Weird; Arena of Awesomeness; Cats and Dogs | Alex Zane | E4 | 11 November to 30 December 2014 |
| Special | 2014 | Christmas Cracker 2014 | Alex Zane | Channel 4 | 24 December 2014 |
| Special | 2015 | Welcome to 2015 | Alex Zane | Channel 4 | 1 January 2015 |
| Series 9 | 2015 | 200% Cats; Masters of Disaster; Internet Icons; Cunning Stunts; Prank Bank; Kick-Ass Critters; OMFG; Love Sexy; Ultimate Lols; 200% Dogs | Alex Zane | E4 | 2 August to 29 September 2015 |
| Special | 2015 | Christmas Cracker 2015 | Alex Zane | Channel 4 | 25 December 2015 |
| Special | 2016 | Welcome to 2016 | Alex Zane | Channel 4 | 1 January 2016 |
| Series 10 | 2016 | Daredevils & Dummies; Clan Anarchy; Mashed 'n' Trashed; Rudelympics; Feasts of Fury; Animals Unleashed; Man v Machine; Epic Legends; Cats v Dogs; World Wide Weirder | Alex Zane | E4 | 11 January to 14 March 2016 |
| Specials | 2016 | Christmas Cracker 2016; Welcome to 2017 | Alex Zane | Channel 4 | 24 December 2016; 30 December 2016 |
| Series 11 | 2017 | Animals Assemble; Face Palms and Face Plants; Weird v Weirder; Superstars of Stupid; Ultimate Legends; Cats v Dogs – The Rematch; Planet Prank; Heroes of Fail; Creature Chaos; Greatest Hits | Alex Zane | E4 | 16 May to 18 July 2017 |

== Releases ==
- Alex Zane presents The Best of Rude Tube (2011, DVD, 158 minutes, Acorn Media)

== International distribution ==
The show aired in the United States on the Fusion cable & satellite channel.

== See also ==
- Robert's Web – a similar television series
- Totally Viral – a similar television series
