= Mataura railway station =

Railway station in Southland, New Zealand

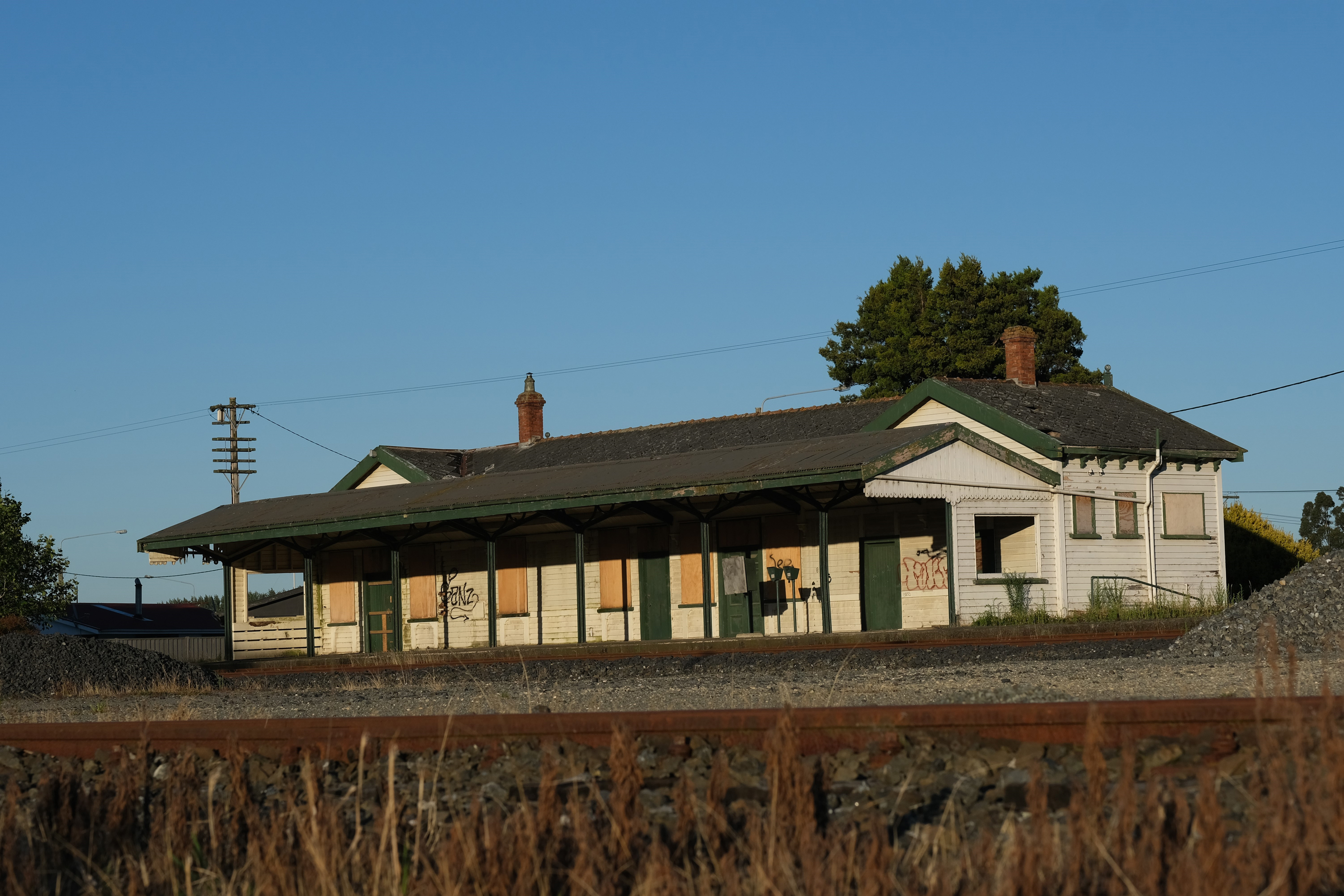
- Mataura railway station in 2024, prior to restoration beginning in 2026

General information
- Location: Main Street; Mataura; New Zealand
- Coordinates: 46°11′44.563″S 168°51′48.4056″E
- Elevation: 57 metres (187 ft)
- System: New Zealand Government Railways (NZGR); Regional rail
- Line: South Island Main Trunk
- Distance: 549.92 kilometres (341.70 mi) from Lyttelton
- Platforms: Single side

Construction
- Structure type: at-grade
- Architect: George Troup
- Architectural style: Troup Vintage

Other information
- Classification: RHTNZ Category B building

History
- Opened: 7 June 1875
- Closed: 1 December 1970; Reopened; closed again 10 February 2002
- Rebuilt: 1920–1921

Heritage New Zealand – Category 2
- Designated: 25 October 1996
- Reference no.: 7345
Location

Mataura railway station is a historic railway station building in the town of Mataura, in Southland. The station opened in 1875. After a fire destroyed the station building in 1920, it was replaced by the present building, designed by George Troup and built in 1920–21. In 1996 Heritage New Zealand listed the building as a Category 2 historic place.

The building later fell into disrepair, with rotting weatherboards and boarded-up windows and doors. In 2019 the Gore District Council voted to buy the station from KiwiRail for $1, but the purchase was never completed, and in 2022 the council decided not to proceed. In August 2025 it was announced that the building would pass from KiwiRail to the Rail Heritage Trust of New Zealand, and it is now being restored.

== History ==
=== Opening and early years ===
Work on the Invercargill and Mataura railway began with the turning of the first sod on 6 September 1872; the contractors were John Brogden and Sons. The station opened on 7 June 1875, when the second section of the line, from Woodlands to Mataura, was formally opened; the day was observed as a holiday in Invercargill. The next section, to Gore, was formally opened for public traffic on 30 August 1875. (Note: Heritage New Zealand states that the first station was built approximately five years after the line reached the town, and the Rail Heritage Trust's building page says it may have been built about 1880. These accounts have not been reconciled with the station's recorded opening in 1875.)

=== Relocation and rebuilding ===
In January 1913 a public meeting in Mataura resolved to ask the Minister of Railways for a new station, as residents had understood that one would be provided when the yard was altered; they described the existing building as more than 33 years old and without a parcels office. The Minister's reply, which referred to the department's intention to remove the existing building to a new site, said that it was suitable and that a new building was not justified. By the end of May 1913 it was reported that the station had been shifted to the other side of the line to make more room in the goods yard. A survey plan of 1883 shows the station on the river side of the line, at the Bridge Street end of the yard, opposite the side on which the present building stands.

On the afternoon of 11 May 1920 the station, which was reported to have five rooms and to have been rebuilt seven years earlier, was destroyed by fire. The papers and fittings were saved, and a bucket brigade and a chemical extinguisher prevented the fire from spreading to the outbuildings and the stationmaster's house, which were threatened by a high wind; the cause was reported to be unknown. Temporary accommodation was found in the goods shed while a replacement was planned. More than three months passed before work began on the new building. In December 1920 it was reported to be nearing completion, with carpenters and painters putting the finishing touches to it, and the books and instruments were moved into it; it was described as much the same size as the old station, with the luggage room moved to the south end next to the office and the platform widened by five feet, and completion was expected before the holidays. The new building was designed by George Troup and cost £1,696 for the main building and £600 for the verandah. It is a comparatively late example of the Troup Vintage style of railway station.

=== Passenger services and heritage listing ===
Passenger traffic at the station closed on 1 December 1970 with the Southerner train service initially bypassing the station. The goods shed was removed in 1982. The Southerner express had started calling at Mataura by the 1990s. On 25 October 1996 Heritage New Zealand listed the building as a Category 2 historic place, and it was partly restored in 1998, with a cafe operating in it from 1999. In 2001 a five-year restoration project by the Mataura Economic Development Company, supported by a $50,000 grant from the Community Trust of Southland, received a rail heritage restoration award. Passenger trains ceased in February 2002, when the last Southerner ran on 10 February. (Note: The Southerner express's October 1976 timetable brochure lists no stop at Mataura. The date on which passenger calls resumed has not been established.)

=== Ownership and disrepair ===
In 2018 KiwiRail offered the building to the Gore District Council's Mataura Community Board on the conditions that it be relocated, that its earthquake-prone chimneys be removed, and that it be upgraded in line with any approved conservation plan. In June 2019 the council voted, on the board's recommendation, to buy the station for $1, and the board planned to move it to a new site in the town for use as a community facility. KiwiRail had urged the council to act quickly, as the offer was due to expire and the Waimea Plains Railway Trust had shown an interest in the building. The purchase was not completed: ownership was not formally transferred, as decisions and consents were needed to relocate the building, and by September 2021 the agreement with KiwiRail had lapsed. In 2021 the board bought two sections in Nuffield Street, beside Queens Park, to which it planned to move the building.

A feasibility study for the board in 2022 described the building as run down and in urgent need of repair, with a roof missing slates and water entering the building, and put the cost of moving and upgrading it at more than $1 million. The study found three remaining options: moving it to the Waimea Plains Railway Trust's site at Mandeville, north-west of Gore; having another organisation take or lease it; or demolition. It found no option for restoring the building where it stood, as KiwiRail owned the land. Funding for the move to Mandeville was reported to be uncertain. In September 2022 the council decided not to buy the station, after its chief executive concluded that the project was not viable and no clear use had been identified for the building.

The building still had not been restored by 2024, when it was reported as having holes in its roof, rotting weatherboards and boarded-up windows and doors, and KiwiRail was trying without success to give it away or lease it.

Mataura Railway Station
Mataura railway station, c. 1905, before the 1913 alterations

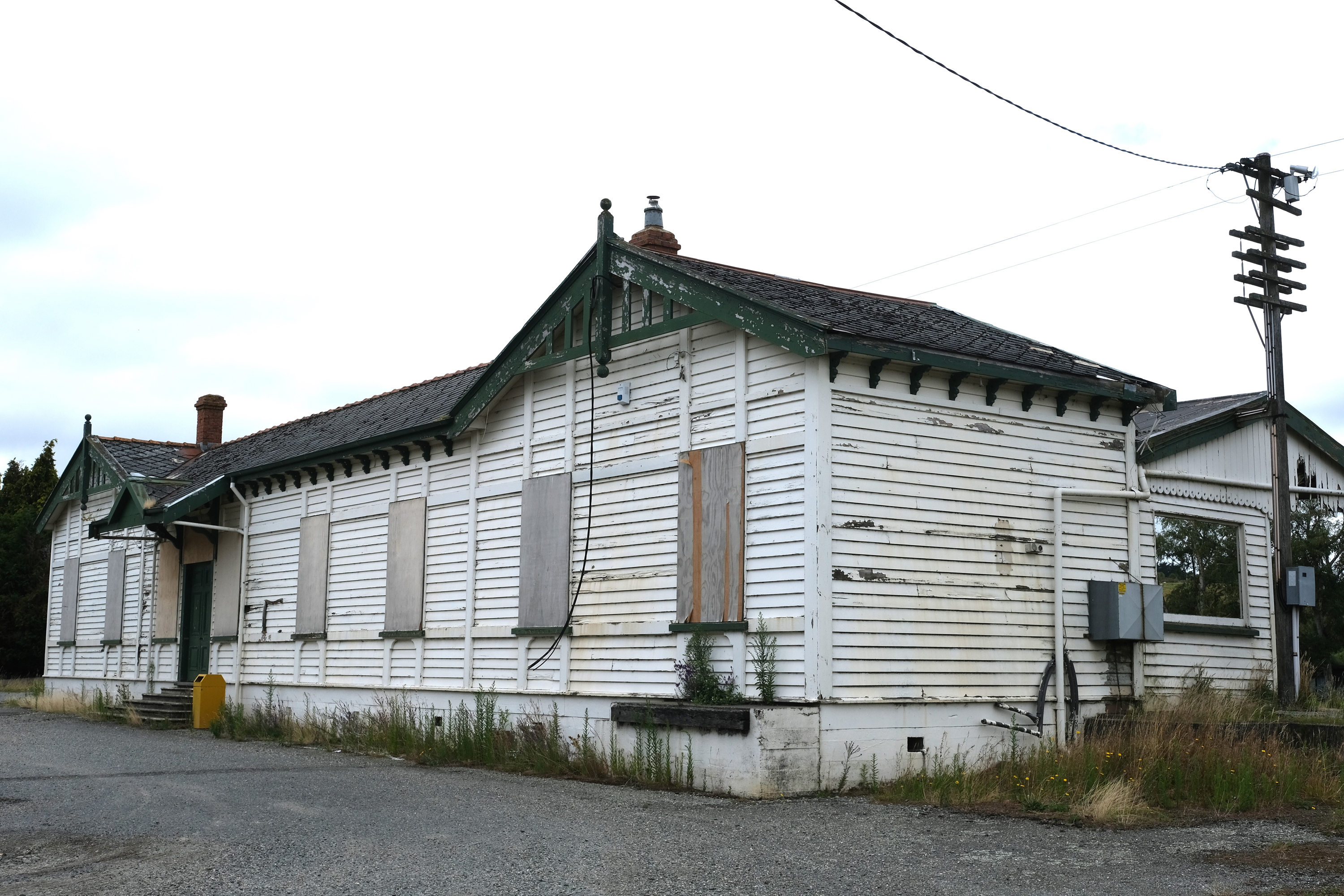
Mataura railway station in 2024

=== Restoration ===
On 28 August 2025 Winston Peters, the Minister for Rail, visited the station and announced that KiwiRail would increase its annual funding for the Rail Heritage Trust of New Zealand from $125,000 to $500,000, and that ownership of the station would pass from KiwiRail to the trust. (Note: The Minister's statement on the day said that discussions were under way to transfer ownership, whereas the Rail Heritage Trust's account says that ownership had been transferred. In January 2026 the trust's executive officer described August 2027 as two years after the trust took ownership. The accounts have not been reconciled.) In January 2026 the trust's executive officer said that its aim was to complete the restoration by August 2027, and that the most urgent work was to make the building weathertight, beginning with temporary boarding over three holes in the roof.

Restoration work began in early September 2026, when parts of the timber windbreaks at each end of the platform canopy and the corrugated iron on the rear of the canopy roof were removed so that the building could be scaffolded and tented. The first stage involves replacing the roof tiles and sarking, repairing roof timbers and repointing the chimneys, followed by repairs and repainting of the exterior, with the interior to follow. The trust aims to return the building to its 1921 appearance, including period signage. In March 2026 it said it was searching for signs that would have appeared on the platform more than a hundred years earlier, using a photograph of the station master and his staff from about 1923–24, held by the Mataura and District Historical Society, to identify them, and it has asked for help identifying local advertisers of about 1920 and the colours of their signs so that replicas can be made. It intends to find a tenant for the station.

== See also ==
- List of historic places in Gore District
