= Totally Viral =

- Genre: Comedy
- Narrated by: Donald Sinden
- Country of origin: United Kingdom
- Original language: English

Production
- Running time: 30 minutes
- Production companies: RDF, Spun Gold

Original release
- Network: UKTV G2, Dave
- Release: 27 November 2006 – 4 November 2007

Totally Viral is a British comedy television programme, composed entirely of clips from video-sharing Internet websites such as YouTube. It featured narration from English actor Donald Sinden, and premiered in the UK on 27 November 2006. The series' target audience was 16 to 34-year-old men – it was produced by Spun Gold TV (who had previously produced the programme The Madness of Boy George) in association with RDF Television. It featured jokes from DV3 Productions, an animated opening title sequence created by Jonti Picking of Sumo Dojo, and "Sweet Talk", a short film by Lorcan Finnegan. In promotion of the show, the channel boss Steve North remarked that virals were "truly ... the entertainment of the future". Totally Viral was initially broadcast on weeknights on UKTV G2, before moving to Dave when the channel was rebranded in October 2007 – at this time, a new season of 10 episodes was commissioned, which began on 26 October 2007.

== See also ==
- Robert's Web – a similar television series
- Rude Tube – a similar television series
