= Creamoata =

Discontinued New Zealand oats brand

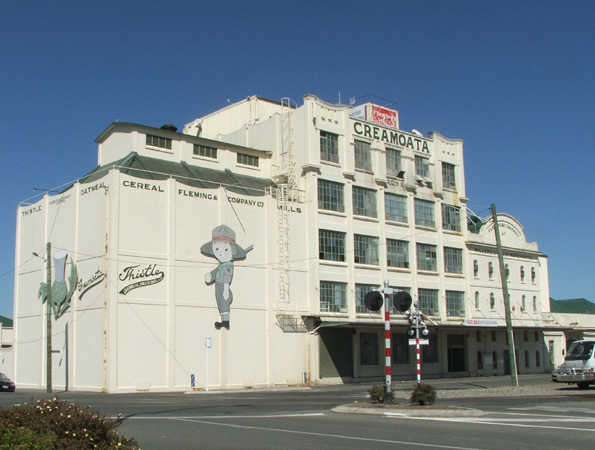
The Creamoata mill complex in Gore in 2008

Creamoata was a New Zealand brand of rolled oats produced from 1906 until its discontinuation in 2008. The brand's mascot was a military-style character called Sergeant Dan, created c. 1915. The former Creamoata mill complex still stands in Gore, which is listed by Heritage New Zealand as a Category I historic place.

== History ==
Creamoata was created in 1906, the name Creamoata coming from the phrase "cream of the oat". It was a type of "finely ground rolled oats used to make porridge". By 1917, 50 million bowls of Creamoata were being sold per year. In 1920 Creamoata sponsored the country's first flight from Invercargill to Auckland, which has been described as Southland's first aerial advertising campaign. During the flight, silver spoons were dropped over towns from the aeroplane using parachutes. The brand used the slogan "Eat Creamoata with a silver spoon" from 1918 to 1932. The Southland Times has described Creamoata as once being "equivalent to Weet-Bix as a historic national breakfast food". A 1999 New Zealand postage stamp features Creamoata, as part of a nostalgia series.

In 2001 the Creamoata oat mill in Gore was closed, as Goodman Fielder had transferred its oat milling operations to Wahgunyah, in the Australian state of Victoria. In 2001, before the closure, Southern Grain and Seed bought the mill. In 2006 Goodman Fielder acquired Fleming's, the manufacturer of Creamoata, and subsequently began selling Creamoata under the Uncle Tobys brand. Creamoata was discontinued in 2008 due to a decline in sales. Tracy Hicks, the mayor of Gore, responded by stating that "Flemings Creamoata is a name synonymous with the Gore district, and good, healthy Scottish breakfasts. It will be sadly missed." In 2026 the Otago Daily Times reported that there were plans to create a permanent Creamoata display in the Māruawai Centre.

== Sergeant Dan ==
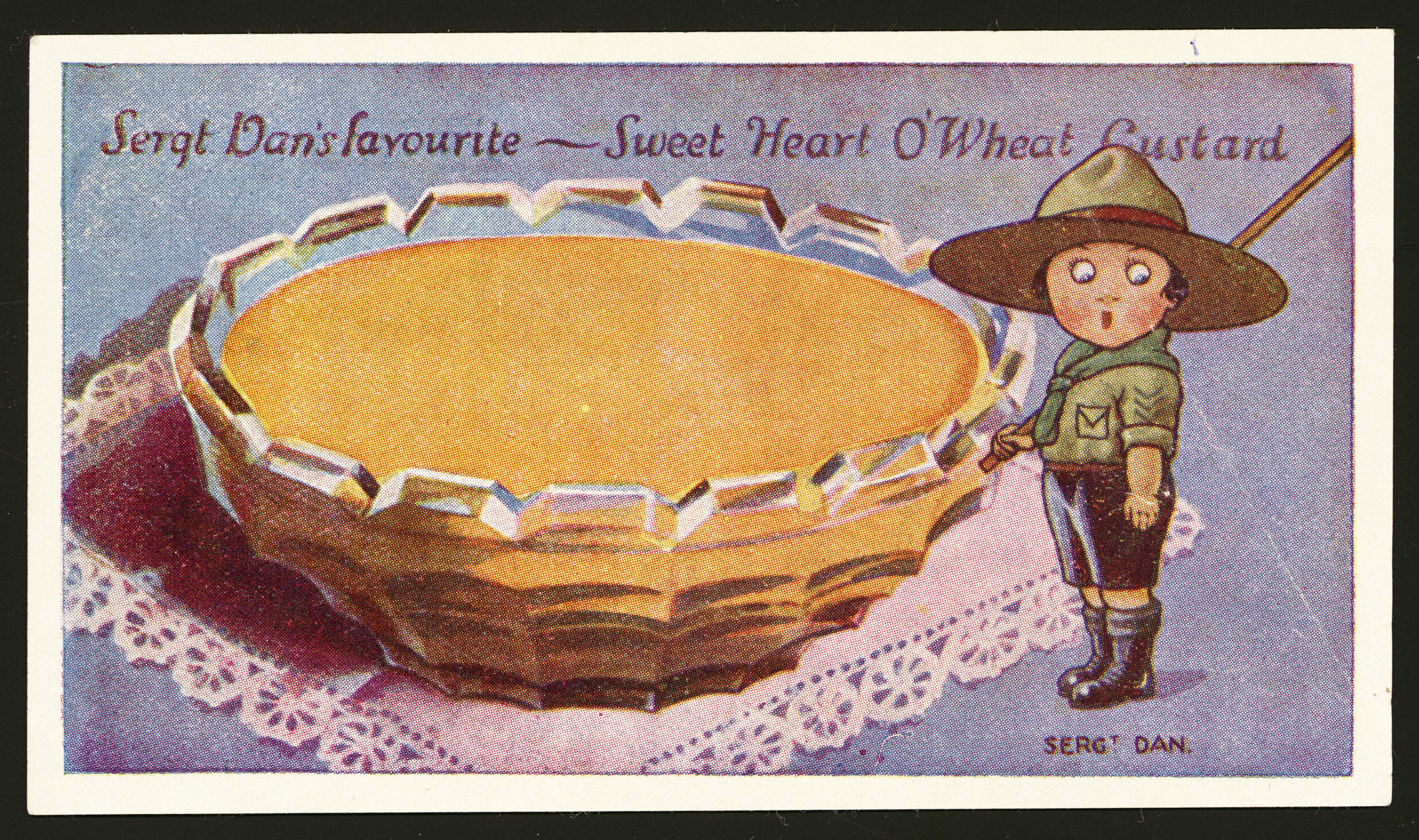
Sergeant Dan advertising Fleming's Creamoata, 1933

Sergeant Dan is a character that was used in Creamoata advertising. The Gore Historical Museum says that knowledge about the character's creation is "murky", although a booklet from 1940 says that he was created by Charlotte Lillian Lawlor. The character has been described as "being part boy scout, part boy soldier", created in a time when scouting was popular, and when New Zealand was participating in the First World War. According to the Otago Daily Times, "One of the key messages behind the character was that Sgt Dan could do anything and be anything because he started each day with a hearty and healthy bowl of Creamoata porridge." Sgt Dan had a twin sister named Pam, a Girl Guide; she was created in the late 1920s, but is not as widely known as Sgt Dan.

A promotion in the 1920s allowed people cut out images of Sergeant Dan from Creamoata boxes, and once they had a certain number of them, could exchange them for a silver-plated spoon. Sergeant Dan has appeared on porridge bowls and an ashtray. Sergeant Dan and his family members appears in a 1950s happy families card deck produced by Four Square.

There is a Sergeant Dan on the Creamoata mill complex in Gore; the character was placed there in 1982. In 2005 the stock feed manufacturer SGT Dan Stockfoods Ltd was founded and subsequently bought the former Creamoata Mill in Gore. The Sergeant Dan trademark is owned by this company. Sergeant Dan has been used in other situations unrelated to Gore or the stockfoods company, such as when he was once made to appear similar to Santa and when he was given a broken arm when Gore Hospital was destined for closure.

In 2015 an exhibition about Sergeant Dan was opened in the Croydon Aviation Heritage Centre to celebrate his 100th birthday. In 2026, to celebrate Sergeant Dan's 111th birthday, Gore primary school children created 111 versions of Sergeant Dan as signs, which were temporarily on display in the front window of the Māruawai Centre.

== Mill complex ==
Creamoata's mill complex, located at 41-43 Mersey Street in Gore, was listed by Heritage New Zealand as a Category I historic place in the year 2000. The flour mill was created in 1877 and the oldest surviving parts the complex are from about 1893. Fires damaged it in 1912 and 1918. The side of the factory features Sergeant Dan. The building was painted and cleaned in 2022.
