= Charlotte Lawlor =

New Zealand poet and advertising designer

Charlotte Lillian "Bob" Lawlor (3 October 1878 – 2 July 1941) was a New Zealand poet, writer and advertising designer. She created the character of Sergeant Dan to help sell Creamoata, a cereal product, in 1915.

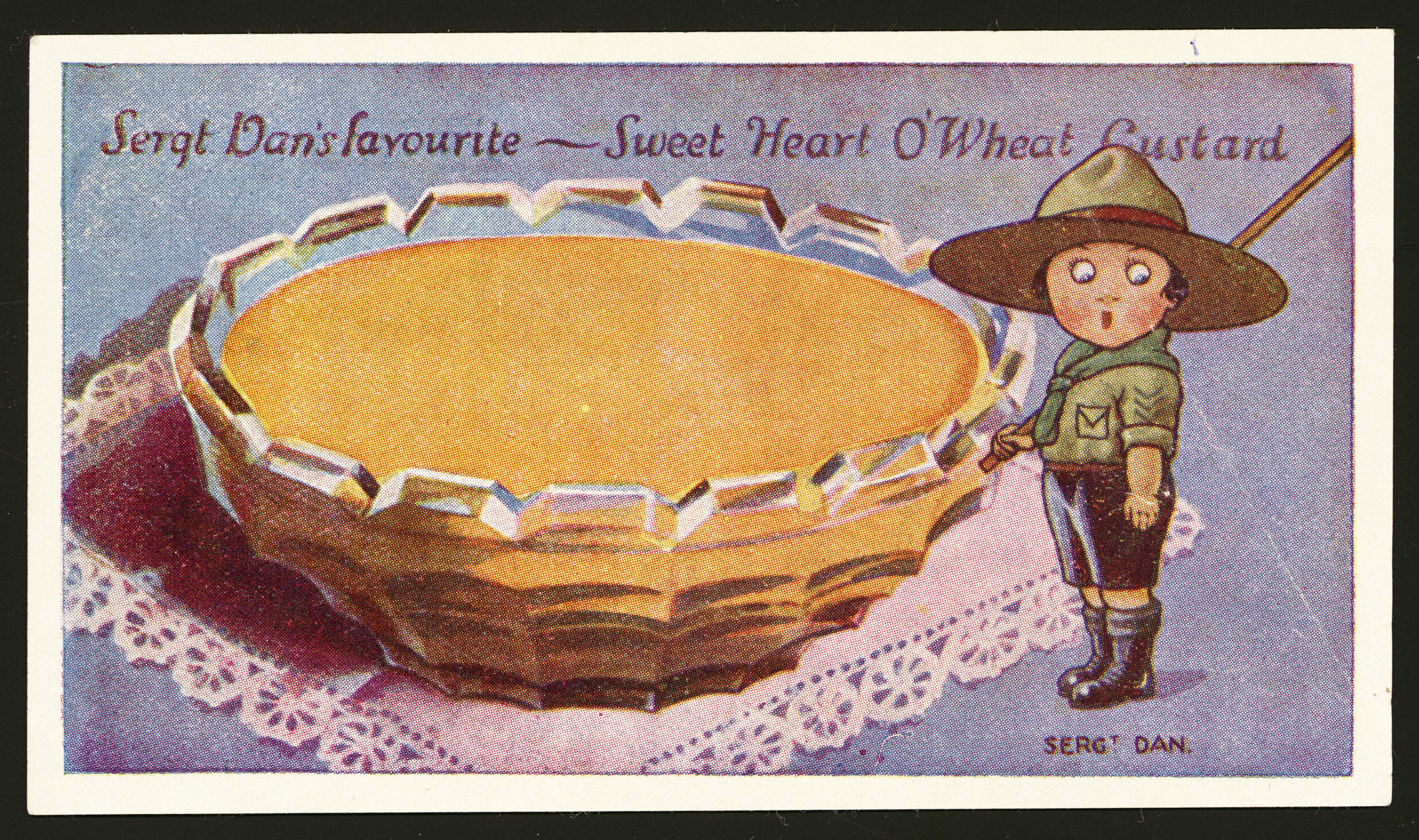
Sergeant Dan advertising Fleming's Creamoata, 1933

== Biography ==
Lawlor was born in Thames, New Zealand, in 1878 and as a child was given the family nickname 'Bob', which she used her whole life. Her father was George James Lawlor and her mother was Augusta Eliza Lawlor (née Gray). She and her three sisters were initially educated at home by a governess, but when her father's business started losing money the children were sent to Kauaeranga Boys' School in Thames instead. She later attended Thames High School.

Lawlor's writing was published in a number of publications, including the New Zealand Illustrated Magazine, the Otago Witness and the Canterbury Times. She also had poetry published under the pen names Bob Lawlor and Ruthyn in The New Zealand Herald, Auckland Star, Exporter, Mirror, N.Z. Artists' Manual and The Radio Record. Lawlor later published three books of poetry.

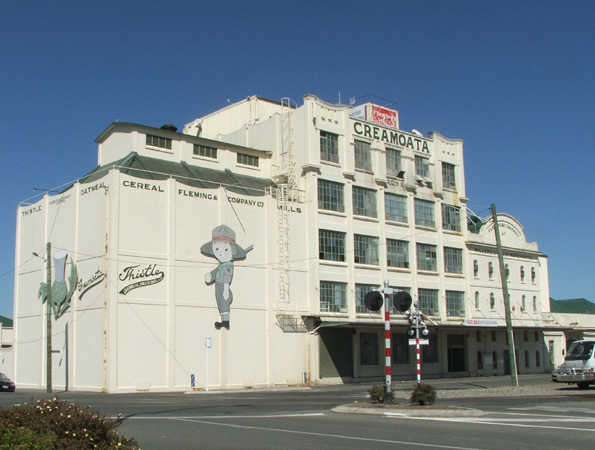
Sergeant Dan on the former Flemings mill in Gore

In 1913, Lawlor's father died and Lawlor and her mother moved to Auckland. Lawlor worked for advertising agency Chandler & Co., and while there designed the Sergeant Dan advertising story for Creamoata, a product of Flemings, a cereal company based in Gore.

Lawlor died in Thames on 2 July 1941.
