= Save the Badger Badger Badger =

Single by Weebl and Brian May featuring Brian Blessed
- Released: 19 May 2013
- Recorded: 2013

Brian May singles chronology
"You and I" (2012)	"Save the Badger Badger Badger" (2013)	"New Horizons" (2019)

Weebl singles chronology
"Badger Badger Badger" (2003)	"Save the Badger Badger Badger" (2013)

Brian Blessed singles chronology
""Army of the Damned" by Pythia" (2009)	"Save the Badger Badger Badger" (2013)

"Save the Badger Badger Badger" is a mashup of Jonti Picking's 2003 viral Flash animation Badgers and "Flash" by Queen. The song was released on 19 May 2013, in response to proposed badger culling in the United Kingdom. The song features vocals and guitar from Brian May and visuals reminiscent to the 1980 film Flash Gordon, in addition to vocals from Weebl and Brian Blessed. Said May of the song:

The British people are speaking in their many thousands, and yet the Government is refusing to listen. We thank them for buying this track and giving the badgers a voice. Let’s get this to number one so David Cameron cannot avoid it. This cull is unscientific, unethical and won’t work. The government is set to murder 5,000 badgers and yet all the peer-reviewed scientific evidence shows that the answer to the problem of bovine TB in cattle does not lie in this slaughter and that this action will be ineffective and potentially damaging to the welfare of both farm animals and wildlife. It is shocking that the NFU and the government have been allowed to continue with a politically led policy with no basis in science against the will of the people. Badgers rock!

— Brian May

== Charts ==
On 1 September 2013, the song charted at #79 on the UK Singles Chart, #39 on the UK iTunes chart and #1 on the iTunes Rock chart. This can likely be attributed to the song being the subject of an episode of the Last Leg which aired live at 10pm on Channel 4 on Wednesday 28 August, where host Adam Hills said in no uncertain terms "by next week I want to see this song on the charts. If you’re watching the show now, do whatever you can to play it during the week. If you're a DJ put it on the radio, if you're at a wedding, make it the first dance". The RSPCA also issued their support for it and vocal contributor Brian Blessed had a few words of his own:

A life of two Brians. Brian May is absolutely inspirational and together we will beat the dark forces and save the badgers.

— Brian Blessed
