= Jonti Picking =

British internet personality (born 1975)

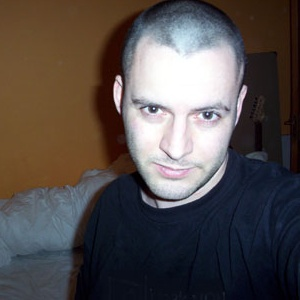
- Picking in 2003
- Born: Jonathan Picking; 17 May 1975 (age 51); Doncaster, South Yorkshire, England
- Other names: Weebl; Mr. Weebl; Jonti
- Occupations: Internet personality; flash animator
- Years active: 2002–present
- Notable work: Weebl and Bob; Savlonic; Badgers
- Spouse: Sarah Darling (m. 2007)
- Children: 2
- Website: www.weebls-stuff.com

Jonathan "Jonti" Picking (born 17 May 1975), also known as Weebl and Mr Weebl, is a British Internet personality and Flash animator and is the creator of Weebl's Stuff.

His animations are known for repetitive melodies and surreal dialogue; the majority feature a catchy tune with silly lyrics, paired with a looping animation. He does most of the voices in his animations himself, and several feature himself in live action, including "Haricots Verts", "Chutney", "Boogie", "CAMRA", "Stock Market", "We Are Mature", "Tangerine" the Weebl and Bob episodes "DJ" and "Safety", the fourth On The Moon episode, and "Jazzmas". He has also worked with other animators on YouTube, such as Edd Gould in the video "Nuts (feat. MrWeebl)".

== Career ==
Picking is a trained sound engineer and artist, and he has worked on 3D visual effects for the film Resident Evil. In 2003, he made several advertisements for Anchor Butter in the style of his Weebl and Bob animations (but featuring cows) which were broadcast in the UK. The television program Totally Viral on UKTV G2, consisting of video clips and cartoons from the internet, has an animated title sequence and links made by Picking.

Picking set up his own production company called Sumo Dojo, which he later left to set up Weebl's Stuff Limited, also known as Weebl Ltd. Weebl's Stuff Ltd was dissolved in 2014, and Jelly Penguin Productions Ltd was set up in its place shortly afterward. In 2009, Picking produced several radio and television advertisements based on the tune of the first "Magical Trevor" for the 118 24 7 service of Yell.com. These appeared on the ITV television channel, amongst others. It was voted 6th Most Irritating Ad of 2009 by Marketing Magazine. He is also an admitted fan of Wesley Willis and created an animation for Willis' song "Merry Christmas".

=== Weebl's Stuff ===
Weebl's Stuff is Picking's personal website. Whilst initially starting with his own creations (The show "Weebl and Bob" was previously hosted on Newgrounds before moving to Weebl's Stuff), it quickly grew to incorporate numerous series and numerous staff. As well as providing the site with animations, usually at least twice a week, Weebl's Stuff also provides animation services to companies. Clients have included E4, Yellow Pages, and Anchor.

=== HuHa ===
In 2012 Picking began contributing to the YouTube comedy channel HuHa! under the name of Jelly Penguin. He produced several shorts, including Evil Guy (a parody of super-villains from comic books and Saturday morning cartoons), Beef House (a parody of the A-Team in which the protagonists are butchers) and BAD Advice (a parody of public information films from the 1970s and 1980s). As of 2014, no further works for HuHa have been produced, either by Picking or others.

=== Team Badger ===
In 2013, Picking teamed up with Queen guitarist and animal rights activist Brian May and actor Brian Blessed, along with a number of animal rights organisations including the RSPCA, to form "Team Badger", a coalition against the British Government's proposed badger cull. Picking, May and Blessed recorded a single, Save The Badger Badger Badger, a mashup of 2003's Badgers, and Queen's Flash, featuring vocals by Blessed. Picking also animated the music video, which parodied elements of the original "Badger" animation, as well as a scene from the 1980 film Flash Gordon, in which Blessed played Prince Vultan, and for which Queen provided the soundtrack. On 1 September 2013, Save The Badger Badger Badger charted at No. 79 on the UK Singles Chart, No. 39 on the UK iTunes chart and No. 1 on the iTunes Rock chart.

=== Savlonic ===
Savlonic is a synthpop/synthwave virtual band consisting of singer Rosco (formerly Roscoe Thunderpants) portrayed by Picking, singer/keyboardist Eve (formerly Evangeline D'isco) portrayed by Sarah Darling, backing vocalist/drummer Kandi Flaus (portrayed by Katt Wade), and guitarist Kaspar Funk (Daniel Dobbs).

As of March 2019, nine Savlonic songs have been made into music videos: "Electro Gypsy", "Tiny Japanese Girl", and "Action Causes Reaction" were all animated by Picking, the latter-most being animated in the Unity engine as a VR experience. The videos for "Wandering Eye", "The Driver", "Computer Guy" and "Spelunker" were animated by Peabo. "Broken" and "Hi-Lights" were animated by Kr3id.

The band has released four full-length albums: Red (2014), Neon (2016), Black Plastic (2019) and Ultraviolet (2024). All of them were funded by the fans of Weebl and Savlonic through the crowdfunding website Kickstarter Emulat0r (2017) and Emulated (2020), two cover albums, were released in 2017 and 2020 (these do not count towards Savlonic's numbered releases). They have also released a five-song EP named after the band's animated frontman Rosco, and multiple tracks released as singles ("Sweet" and "00:00:00").

=== Other work ===
Picking created various single-shot cartoons for social media, some of which gained notoriety beyond the internet. For example, Narwhals, a looped animated music video animated by Wonchop, is about the narwhal, and, throughout the song, a list of "facts" are presented as to why narwhals are "awesome". They are variously described as being, among other things, "the Jedi of the sea" and "inventors of the Shish Kebab", accompanied by claims that narwhals could "beat a polar bear in a fight" or can "stop Cthulhu eating ye", with a warning to not allow narwhals to make contact with one's testicles. In 2015 Sprint used the first part of this video as part of an advertising campaign. On 4 June 2018, part of the lyrics of Narwhals was recited in the House of Commons of the United Kingdom by Alex Sobel MP during debate on the Ivory Bill.

== Personal life ==
Picking married Sarah Darling, a radio presenter on the station Xfm, on 31 March 2007. On 23 December 2008, Picking announced his wife's pregnancy on the Weebl's Stuff forums. On 13 July 2009, Picking's wife gave birth to a girl. Picking and Darling also have a son together, born 2 June 2011.

== Discography ==
Picking has produced several mini-albums, most of which feature extended versions of songs featured in his animations. Many are available for purchase on the music streaming site Bandcamp or to stream on Spotify.

- Pure Yak Frenzy (produced with Rob Manuel from b3ta) (2003)
- Hands Over Pastry (6 April 2009)
- Yesterday's Lemon (26 October 2009)
- Magical Chalk Toilet (17 November 2010)
- Shabby Bacon Hut (2 November 2011)
- Ooh. Waffle Dog (23 November 2012)
- On Board the Beef Bus (16 January 2014)
- Red (as Savlonic) (18 August 2014)
- Neon (as Savlonic) (19 September 2016)
- Emulat0r (as Savlonic) (21 September 2017)
- A Right Festive Northern Christmas (14 December 2017)
- Black Plastic (as Savlonic) (19 March 2019)
- Emulated (as Savlonic) (14 May 2020)
- Ultraviolet (as Savlonic) (9 December 2024)
