= Meadow Fresh =

New Zealand dairy brand

Meadow Fresh NZ Limited
- Type: Private Company
- Industry: Food Manufacturing
- Founded: 17 December 1954
- Fate: Taken over by Goodman Fielder (Brand retained)
- Headquarters: Auckland, New Zealand
- Products: Dairy
- Website: www.meadowfresh.co.nz

Meadow Fresh is a New Zealand dairy brand. It is owned by Goodman Fielder. The modern brand came into being as the result of a brand swap in September 2005 between Dairy Foods, owned by Graeme Hart, and New Zealand Milk, owned by Fonterra.

The two companies that emerged from the swap were:

- Fonterra Brands New Zealand Limited, owned by Fonterra.
- Mainland Products Limited, (which had existed since 1954 and became Meadow Fresh from 31 October 2005), owned by Dairy Foods, which was still owned initially by Graeme Hart.

Dairy Foods was subsequently sold to Goodman Fielder in connection with the IPO of that company. On 3 July 2006, Dairy Foods, Top Hat Convenience Foods, and Goodman Fielder New Zealand amalgamated to become Goodman Fielder New Zealand.

== Meadow Fresh NZ Ltd ==
Meadow Fresh manufactures and distributes dairy products under these brands

- Meadow Fresh (fresh and UHT milk);
- Meadow Fresh Yoghurt;
- Tararua Cultured;
- Bouton D'Or, Chesdale, Ornelle, Puhoi Valley Cheese

Meadow Fresh also have distribution arrangements for Fonterra Brands products through its Route Food Service.

== Glass milk bottles ==
Meadow Fresh was the last company in New Zealand to market milk in glass bottles. On 30 November 2005, production of glass bottled milk at their Christchurch production plant ceased, ending this era.

== Distribution ==
- Meadow Fresh outsource a fleet of chilled linehaul trucks to distribute products to supermarkets, milk deliverers and route trade vans.
- Meadow Fresh "Milkies" distribute fresh milk to some homes and businesses throughout New Zealand.
- Meadow Fresh route trade salespeople distribute the company's products via a network of chiller trucks.

== Production ==
The company has factories as follows:

- Blenheim Road, Christchurch, (Milk and Beverages)
- Longburn, Palmerston North (Milk, Cultured Foods)
- Yoplait, Palmerston North (Cultured Foods)
- Puhoi Valley (Specialty Cheese)
