= Dunedin Tunnels Trail =

Proposed walking and cycling path in New Zealand

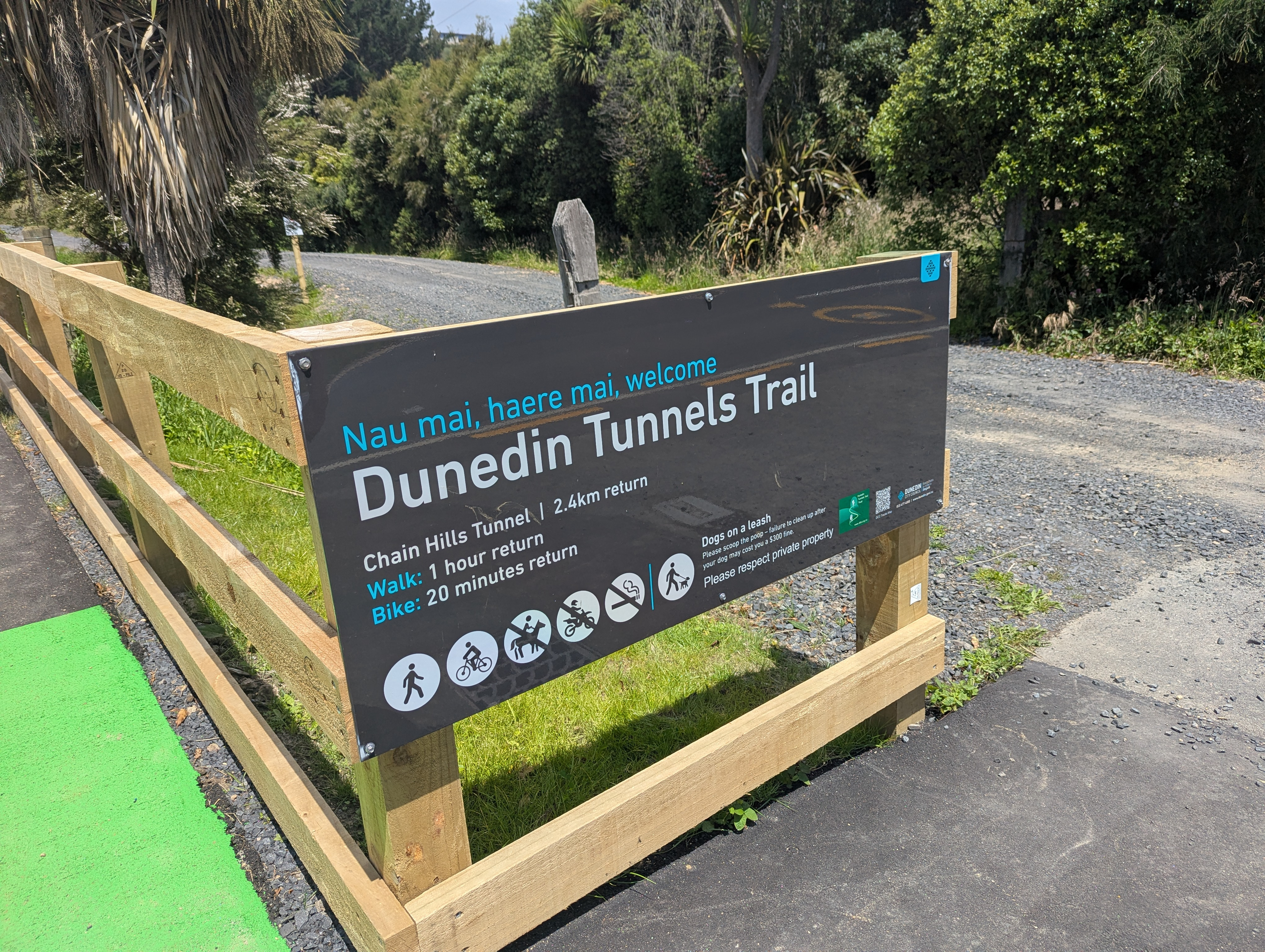
- Chain Hills Tunnel section, Stage One, December 2025
- Length: 15 km (9.3 mi)
- Location: Dunedin and Mosgiel, New Zealand
- Established: 2025 (Stage One)
- Use: Walking, cycling, recreational use
- Difficulty: Easy
- Season: All year
- Surface: Gravel, off-road trail
- Maintained by: Dunedin Tunnels Trail Trust and Dunedin City Council
- Website: https://www.dttt.org.nz/

The Dunedin Tunnels Trail is a proposed 15 km (9.3 mi) shared walking and cycling path in Otago, New Zealand, that is partially open. It will connect the town of Mosgiel to the Dunedin city centre. The trail will follow the former Victorian-era railway alignment between Wingatui and Caversham, featuring two historic rail tunnels: the Chain Hills Tunnel and the Caversham Tunnel.

The route provides a flat, off-road connection between several Dunedin suburbs, including Fairfield, Abbotsford, Green Island, and Burnside.

== History ==
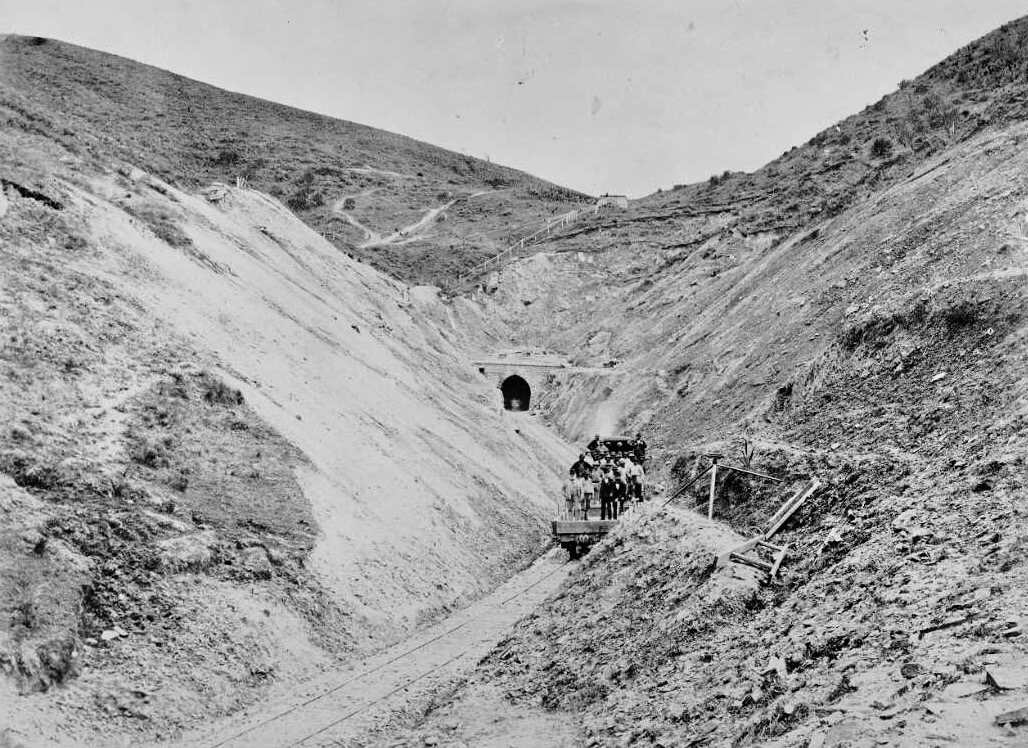
Chain Hills Tunnel, circa 1874. Public domain image from NZ National Library.

The original railway alignment was constructed in the 1870s as part of the Main South Line. Following the opening of a new double-track alignment in 1910, the Chain Hills and Lookout Point (Caversham) tunnels were decommissioned in 1911.

The Dunedin Tunnels Trail Trust was established to restore these tunnels and convert the corridor into a recreational and commuter asset. While the project was initially declined for national funding in early 2024 due to shifts in government priorities, it received a significant boost in November 2025 when the New Zealand Government announced a $2 million grant through the Ministry of Business, Innovation and Employment (MBIE) to support the development of stages 2 and 3.

Clear public support for the tunnel trust was evident in the Dunedin City Council's draft annual plan, with 100 of 141 submissions supporting further funding and assistance for the partially completed trail. Trust chairman Brent Irving said the project had strong community and government backing, and with 6km to go, completion was "both achievable and overdue". "The trust is not seeking direct capital funding, but rather council leadership and prioritisation to unlock delivery — particularly enabling timely access to the Caversham Tunnel."

== Construction stages ==
The project is being developed in five distinct stages:

- Stage 1 – Chain Hills Tunnel: This 1.5-kilometre section runs from Gladstone Road North at Wingatui through the Chain Hills Tunnel. It involved extensive brickwork repairs, the installation of lighting, and a new gravel surface. This stage was officially opened to the public in December 2025.
- Stages 2 & 3 – Wingatui to Burnside: Planned to extend the trail through Fairfield and Abbotsford to Green Island. Supported by government funding, construction is expected to be completed by mid-2027.
- Stages 4 & 5 – Burnside to Caversham: These final stages involve traversing the Kaikorai Valley and the restoration of the Caversham Tunnel. Stage 5, managed by the Dunedin City Council, requires the mitigation of existing utility infrastructure (gas, water, and power) within the tunnel. Completion of the full 15-kilometre route is projected for 2028.

== Features ==
- The trail is designed to be accessible to users of all ages and abilities. Key features include:
- Heritage Preservation: Restoration of Victorian-era rail architecture.
- Connectivity: Integration with the wider Otago trail network, including the Otago Central Rail Trail and Clutha Gold Trail.
- Safety: Fully off-road route with dedicated lighting and fencing along the old railway tracks.
