= Goodman Fielder =

Australian multinational food manufacturer

- Industry: Consumer goods
- Founded: 1986; 40 years ago
- Headquarters: Sydney, New South Wales, Australia
- Area served: Oceania
- Products: Bread; Small goods Dairy products Margarine; Oil; Dressings; Other food ingredients
- Owner: Wilmar International
- Website: goodmanfielder.com

Goodman Fielder is an Australian manufacturer, marketer and distributor of bread, smallgoods, dairy products, margarine, oil, dressings and various food ingredients. Its main operations are in New Zealand, Australia, Fiji, Papua New Guinea, and New Caledonia, with over 40 manufacturing sites. The company employs over 5,000 people, and has more than 120 brands.

== History ==
Goodman Group was founded as A.S. Paterson & Co. ltd in Dunedin in 1886 as a general importing firm by Scottish-born businessman and philanthropist Alexander Stronach Paterson. It was listed on the New Zealand Stock Exchange in 1949 and would come to focus mainly on the grocery business. The firm was renamed as Goodman Group in 1979 after Paterson's grandson Alex was ousted as chairman in 1976 by "dissatisfied baking interests".

Goodman Fielder was founded in 1986 after the merger of Allied Mills Ltd and Goodman Group Ltd. Since the merger in 1986, the company has purchased a further 13 companies. The company was taken over by Burns Philp in 2003.

Goodman Fielder was re-listed on the share market at the end of 2005 with Burns Philp retaining a 20% share (subsequently sold in 2007). As part of the IPO, New Zealand Dairy Foods brands Meadowfresh, Tararua, Kiwi, Huttons, Anchor Cheese (under licence), Top Hat and Puhoi cheese became part of Goodman Fielder.

The Uncle Tobys and Bluebird snack food businesses of the "original" Goodman Fielder were not included in the float, the former being sold to Nestlé and the latter to PepsiCo.

Chris Delaney, the former Asia Pacific President of Campbell's, was Goodman Fielder's CEO from 4 July 2011. He resigned following a takeover of the company by Wilmar International and First Pacific joint-venture in March 2015 for $1.3 billion Australian dollars.

Goodman Fielder's CEO was Scott Weitemeyer, until the takeover by Wilmar International.

In 2019, Wilmar International acquired First Pacific's 50% share in the company.

== Brands ==
The company's brands include:

- Brasserie Bread
- Cornwell's
- Country Life Bakery
- Cow and Gate
- Crisco
- Ernest Adams
- Edmonds
- ETA
- Freya's Continental Style Bread
- Gold'n Canola
- Helga's Continental Bakehouse
- Irvines
- La Famiglia
- Logicol
- Meadow Fresh
- MeadowLea
- Mighty Soft
- Molenberg
- Mother's Choice
- Nature's Fresh
- Noisette
- Olivani
- Olive Grove
- Paradise
- Pampas
- Praise
- Puhoi Valley
- Quality Bakers – a New Zealand brand of bread products, it is a subsidiary of Goodman Fielder and has bakeries throughout Australia and New Zealand.
- Tararua
- Vogel's – a bread based on a recipe by Alfred Vogel
- White Wings
- Yoplait (New Zealand only)

Goodman Fielder operate in the dairy, baking and grocery segments of the food manufacturing market, and have a portfolio of retail and food service brands, including Meadow Fresh, Puhoi Valley, Bouton D'or, Tararua, Vogel's, Quality Bakers, Molenberg, Natures Fresh and Meadowlea.

== Internationally ==
The company exports many of its products to over 30 countries. Goodman Fielder has four divisions, home ingredients, baking, dairy and commercial fats & oils.

== See also ==
- List of bakeries
- List of brand name breads
- List of restaurant chains in Australia
