= B3ta =

British website

b3ta
- Website type: Digital Arts Community, Message board
- Owners: Rob Manuel, Cal Henderson, Denise Wilton
- Creator: Communal
- Website: b3ta.com
- Commercial: No
- Registration: Optional, Required to post
- Launched: 2001

B3ta /ˈbiːtə/ (stylised as b3ta) is a popular British website, described as a "puerile digital arts community" by The Guardian. It was founded in 2001 by Rob Manuel, Denise Wilton and Cal Henderson.

B3ta's main feature is a newsletter featuring the latest work of the B3ta community and other interesting, humorous or perverse things found on the Web. The newsletter has about 100,000 readers. A message board allows members to post digital images and short animations they have created, the ones considered the best appearing on the front page, along with various announcements. Previously there was a B3ta radio show on the London station Resonance FM.

Many popular Internet phenomena were created by B3ta members (also called "b3tans or "B3tards"). These include the Macromedia Flash cartoons created by Joel Veitch and Jonti Picking, the surrealist animations by Cyriak Harris, and the quizzes by Rob Manuel.

A book entitled The Bumper B3ta Book of Sick Jokes was published in 2006, containing jokes compiled from B3ta contributors and a spin-off wiki humour website, Sickipedia.

== Message boards ==
=== Main board ===
On the main board, images and animated GIFs are posted by the members. The B3ta message board has a strong code of "netiquette" – a new thread should generally not be started unless it contains an image, made by that user and not previously posted to /board. Spamming (promoting a website purely for financial gain) is not tolerated.

Newly registered users cannot post on the board until the Tuesday after they register, known as "Newbie Tuesday". This gives an opportunity to discover site etiquette before getting involved.

Internet memes are the lifeblood of B3ta messageboard. Meme is a name given to a clichéd image that is frequently used in images as a cheap gag. Although many older board members may resent the lack of originality shown by using these clichés, some, such as The Quo or The Fear, crop up regularly.

=== Image Challenge ===
This is a weekly Photoshop contest, where images are posted along a certain theme – examples include "New Software Products", or "The World If It Was Run By Kittens". The entries are posted as normal threads on the message board, but are marked with a "C" icon to differentiate from normal posts. Entries are collected in a central repository that can be browsed any time, with the highest voted images displayed first. Three "special mentions" are chosen by the site mods, and these are posted along with the theme of the new challenge in the Friday newsletter.

The challenge topics are alternately chosen by board members, and the "Challenge Dictator" (basically a site moderator) on a two-week cycle.

Image Challenge suggestions appear to be generally listed in order of posting, with the newest responses first. However, whilst a question is open, other users can click "I like this!" which gives a score of one point to that answer. Once a question is closed answers are listed by the number of users who have clicked the "I like this!" on that answer; however, as many answers are submitted each week, most are never clicked on and so are sorted by the time they were posted.

=== Question of the Week (QOTW) ===
Recognizing that "not everyone wants to muck around with Photoshop", the site asks a question each week hoping to provoke amusing anecdotes. It was originally used as material for the radio show and the newsletter, but realising the popularity of the content, the site owners decided to continue the questions after the close of the show. A new topic is begun every Thursday (at which point it becomes impossible to reply to the previous QOTW) and, as with the other areas of the site, Question of the Week attracts regulars known for their characteristic posts. Each post is voted for in the same way as the image challenge.

The first question was "Worst Record Ever?" posed by Rob Manuel in 2003; examples of questions since include "Why should you be fired from your job?", "Mad Stuff You've Done To Get Someone To Sleep With You" and "Expensive mistakes".

QOTW Off Topic was invented for those users of QOTW who found they had things in common and liked to talk to each other using the reply system. Over several weeks it became clear that more and more people were preferring to chat to each other through the replies instead of the /talk board which was already set up, so Off Topic was created.

=== Links board ===
The links board is another section of the site that was created in response to an equivalent page on the 4rthur website. This board is a place for b3ta members to share interesting links they have found, in preference to the original practise of posting them on the main board. The links board has itself become a place for particular groups of b3tans ( or "b3tards") to congregate, and for links specific memes to proliferate.

Posting something which is deemed to be clichéd is not tolerated. These cliché links are often referred to as "glasscock", named after the famous image of a female golfer kissing a glass trophy, which appeared to be a phallic shape due to the camera angle. The best images of the day are displayed on the front page of the site, reaching many more people. The board members vote by clicking a button labelled "I like this!", then the site moderators pick their favourites.

=== Talk board ===
The talk board is identical to the main message board except for the fact that it is not possible to post images. It was created in response to the arrival of 4rthur, a (now defunct) talk based offshoot of b3ta which drew a couple of hundred members away, and, more recently, cliqr, Dynafoo (both also defunct now) and c4mbodia. Also, the site owners wanted a place where people could banter without worrying about creating images.

Like the many message boards, the b3ta talk board has developed a clique-like atmosphere, with many users having met one another at so called "B3ta bashes". Oxford in particular has become known amongst members as a bash hotspot, and has developed from a few B3tards getting together for a drink to a genuine spectacle. On 31 May 2008, the biggest "bash" so far took place in Earls Court, London, although this was mainly a messageboard event.

== B3ta Radio ==
From August 2003 until July 2004, B3ta had its own radio show, which was broadcast from Resonance FM (104.4 FM in London, also available via streaming broadcast from the Resonance FM website) between 4pm and 5pm. The show was presented by Rob Manuel, a co-owner of the site, and David Stevenson. There were often special guests – sometimes contributors to the site, sometimes semi-famous people, such as the drummer from Blur, Miles Hunt of The Wonder Stuff and "a chap who once played a Dalek in Doctor Who".

== The Bumper B3ta Book of Sick Jokes and Sickipedia ==
In 2006, independent publishers The Friday Project and B3ta launched a venture to publish a collection of "sick jokes" gathered from B3ta contributors. A public wiki site named "Sickipedia" (a pun on "Wikipedia") was established to collect user-submitted humour for the book. The site encouraged submission of jokes intended to be bad taste or taboo, and entries were organised under a categorisation system of topics which included racism, jokes about celebrities, current affairs and sexual humour. Similarly to the main B3ta site, Sickipedia site functionality offered an electronic voting system to subject user submissions to a form of peer review.

The book, entitled The Bumper B3ta Book of Sick Jokes, was published on 20 October 2006 and was made available from both online and real-world bookshops. It claims to offer an "antidote" to political correctness. The book is now published by HarperCollins.

The Sickipedia site was sold in 2012. The new owners released an ebook and a print-on-demand book in 2014 entitled The Best Of Sickipedia: A Collection Of The Sickest, Most Offensive and Politically Incorrect Jokes, along with mobile apps. In February 2016, the Sickipedia website went offline due to a drive failure, resulting in the apps also failing.

== Controversy ==
Virgin asked B3ta to run an image competition in which board members could win PlayStation Portables and an Xbox 360 for creating something on the theme "What would happen if you said Yes to everything?". Virgin later cancelled the challenge early because they did not like some of the images being created, including Richard Branson urinating on Rob Manuel, dressed in baby clothes.

On 4 June 2007, a b3ta member posted an "alternative logo" for the 2012 Summer Olympics in London, which referenced an image from the former shock site goatse. The BBC then posted this logo on its website and ran it on its BBC News 24 channel as part of a viewer-submitted contest.

In November 2007, lawyers acting for the musician Prince threatened the site and its members with legal action over an image challenge.

In October 2012, a 19-year-old from Chorley, Lancashire, was jailed for copying and pasting Sickipedia jokes about abducted children April Jones and Madeleine McCann onto Facebook.
