= Rob Manuel =

British artist

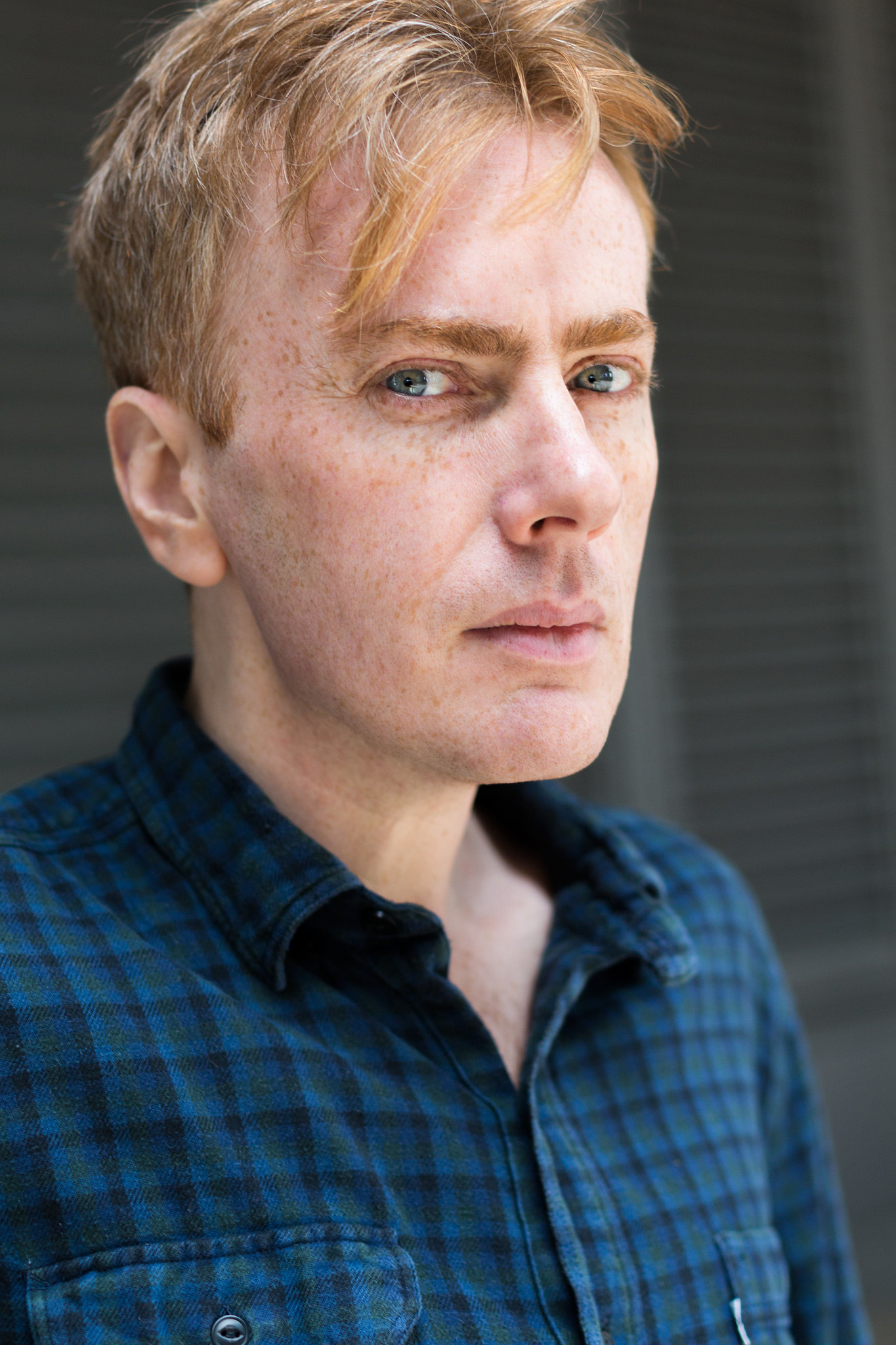
- Manuel in 2013
- Website: robmanuel.blogspot.com

Rob Manuel (pronounced Manual) is the English co-founder of the website B3ta.

== Work ==
Manuel is responsible for numerous quizzes and Flash animations. For a time, he presented the B3ta Radio Show on Resonance FM with David Stevenson.

Manuel has developed various social media bots, including Clickbait Robot (@clickbaitrobot, which parodies clickbait, Swear Clock (@swearclock, which posts the time using profanity), and Fesshole (@fesshole, public confessions) with a spin off book.

In 2022, he recorded a mix for the song "Prince Andrew Is a Sweaty Nonce" by The Kunts.
