= Jackson's pipit =

Scientific classification
- Kingdom: Animalia
- Phylum: Chordata
- Class: Aves
- Order: Passeriformes
- Family: Motacillidae
- Genus: Anthus
- Species: A. cinnamomeus
- Subspecies: A. c. latistriatus

Trinomial name
- Anthus cinnamomeus latistriatus Jackson, 1899

Subspecies of bird

Jackson's pipit (Anthus cinnamomeus latistriatus) is a rare and little-known African bird in the pipit and wagtail family, currently treated as a subspecies of the African pipit Anthus cinnamomeus.

It occurs in montane grasslands, migrating to lower altitudes, in the east-central part of the Democratic Republic of the Congo and in southern Uganda. Van Perlo shows an isolated population around the Malawi-Zambia border, apparently in Nyika National Park. One specimen, the type, has been taken in western Kenya.

In appearance Jackson's pipit suggests a dark African pipit. It averages about 16 cm (6.5 in) long. The bill is dark with a pink lower mandible. The back is brown, darker than most other African pipits, with dark streaks. The head is the same colour as the back and marked with white lores (unlike many African pipits) and a white eyebrow that curves around behind the cheek to join a white malar stripe. A dark sub-moustachial stripe separates this latter from the white throat. The underparts differ from the African pipit in being buff instead of white and having streaks extending to the flanks. There is also a buff patch on the side of the neck. Many of the wing feathers have buff edges, and the outer tail feathers are white.

Jackson's pipit has been considered a subspecies of the long-billed pipit; Sibley and Monroe suggested that it might be conspecific with the subspecies of the long-billed pipit Anthus similis bannermani. It has also been considered a subspecies or morph of the African pipit. Van Perlo not only considers it a subspecies of the African pipit, but in turn, like some other authors, considers the African pipit conspecific with Richard's pipit.
