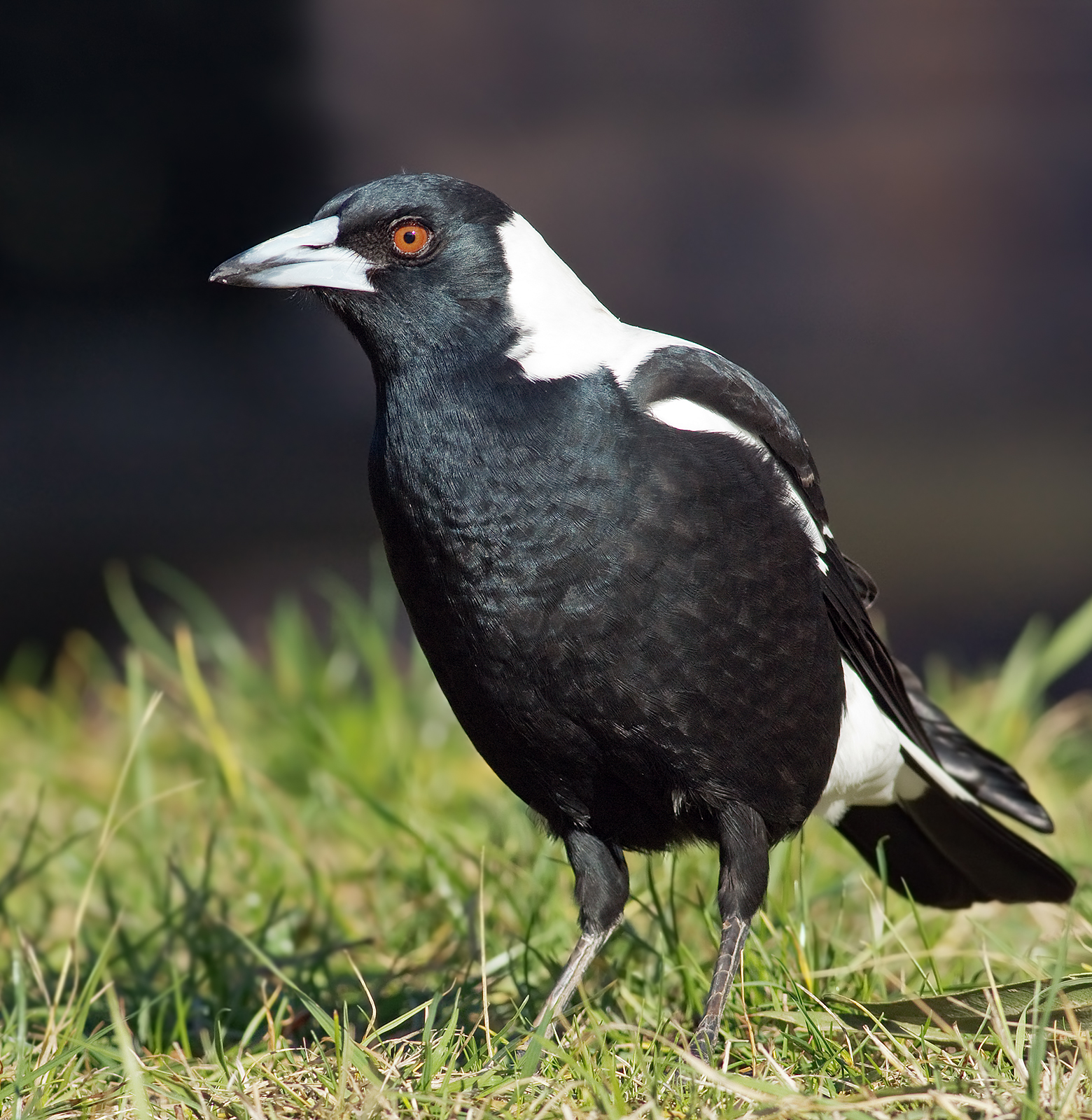
- G. tibicen hypoleuca, Tasmania

Conservation status
- Least Concern (IUCN 3.1)

Scientific classification
- Kingdom: Animalia
- Phylum: Chordata
- Class: Aves
- Order: Passeriformes
- Family: Artamidae
- Subfamily: Cracticinae
- Genus: Gymnorhina; Gray, GR, 1840
- Species: G. tibicen

Binomial name
- Gymnorhina tibicen (Latham, 1801)

Subspecies
- 9, see text
- Natural range

Synonyms
- Cracticus tibicen

= Australian magpie =

Medium-sized black and white passerine bird

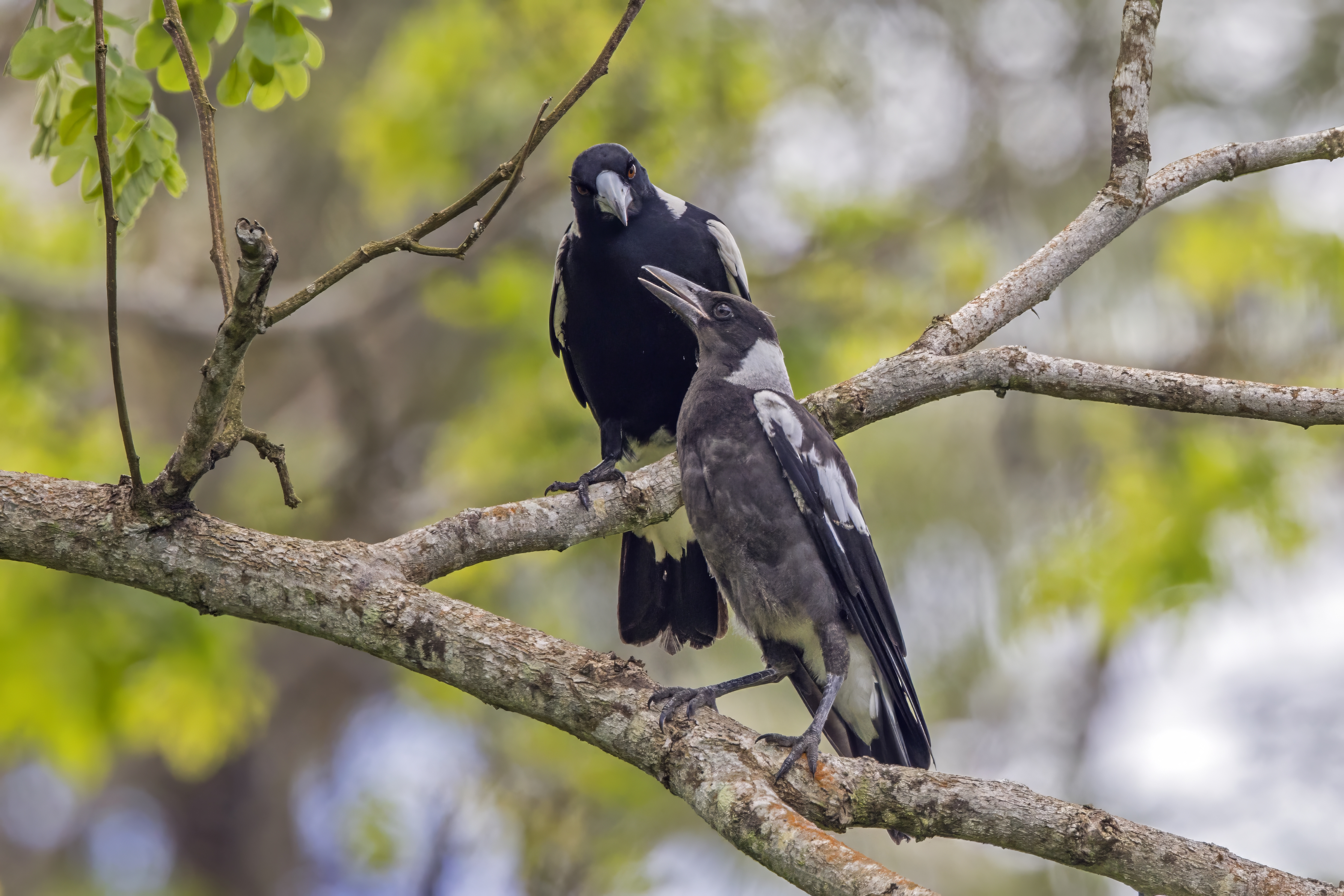
Adult with juvenile Taveuni, Fiji

The Australian magpie (Gymnorhina tibicen) is a black and white passerine bird native to Australia and southern New Guinea, and introduced to New Zealand, and the Fijian island of Taveuni. Although once considered to be three separate species, it is now considered to be one, with nine recognised subspecies. A member of the Artamidae, the Australian magpie is placed in its own genus Gymnorhina and is most closely related to the black butcherbird (Melloria quoyi). It is not closely related to the Eurasian magpie (Pica pica) or any other birds known as magpies, which are corvids.

The adult Australian magpie is a fairly robust bird ranging from 37 to 43 cm (14.5 to 17 in) in length, with black and white plumage, gold brown eyes and a solid wedge-shaped bluish-white and black bill. The male and female are similar in appearance, but can be distinguished by differences in back markings. The male has pure white feathers on the back of the head where the female has white blending to grey feathers. With its long legs, the Australian magpie walks rather than waddles or hops and spends much time on the ground.

Described as one of Australia's most accomplished songbirds, the Australian magpie has an array of complex vocalisations. It is omnivorous, with the bulk of its varied diet made up of invertebrates. It is generally sedentary and territorial throughout its range. Common and widespread, it has adapted well to human habitation and is a familiar bird of parks, gardens and farmland in Australia and New Guinea. This species is commonly fed by households around Australia, but in spring (and occasionally in autumn) a small minority of breeding magpies (almost always males) become aggressive, swooping and attacking those who approach their nests. Research has shown that magpies can recognise at least 100 different people, and may be less likely to swoop individuals they have befriended.

Over 1,000 Australian magpies were introduced into New Zealand from 1864 to 1874, but were subsequently deemed to be displacing native birds and are now treated as a pest species. Introductions also occurred in the Solomon Islands and Fiji, where the birds are not considered an invasive species. The Australian magpie is the mascot of several Australian and New Zealand sporting teams, including the Collingwood Magpies, the Western Suburbs Magpies, Port Adelaide Magpies and, in New Zealand, the Hawke's Bay Magpies.

== Taxonomy and nomenclature ==
The Australian magpie was first described in the scientific literature by English ornithologist John Latham in 1801 as Coracias tibicen, the type collected in the Port Jackson region. (Note: There is some circumstantial evidence that Latham's Supplementum indicis ornithologici sive systematis ornithologiae was not published until 1802 but this evidence is not considered to be of sufficient strength to justify changing the year from the 1801 specified on the title page.) Its specific epithet is derived from the ancient Greek "gumnos" (bare, naked) combined with "rhis" or "rhinos" (nostrils), alluding to their uncovered and bare nostrils and the Latin tibicen "flute-player" or "piper" in reference to the bird's melodious call.

An early recorded vernacular name is piping poller, written on a painting by Thomas Watling, one of a group known collectively as the Port Jackson Painter, some time between 1788 and 1792. Other names used include piping crow-shrike, piping shrike, piper, maggie, flute-bird and organ-bird. The term bell-magpie was proposed to help distinguish it from corvid magpies but failed to gain wide acceptance.

Tarra-won-nang, or djarrawunang, wibung, and marriyang were names used by the local Eora and Darug inhabitants of the Sydney Basin. Booroogong and garoogong were Wiradjuri words and Victorian terms included carrak (Jardwadjali), kuruk (Western Victorian languages), kiri (Dhauwurd Wurrung language) and kurikari (Wuluwurrung). Among the Kamilaroi, it is burrugaabu, galalu, or guluu. In Western Australia it is known as warndurla among the Yindjibarndi people of the central and western Pilbara, and koorlbardi among the south west Noongar peoples. In South Australia, where it is the State emblem, it is the kurraka (Kaurna), murru (Narungga), urrakurli (Adnyamathanha), goora (Barngarla), konlarru (Ngarrindjeri) and tuwal (Bunganditj).

The bird was named for its similarity in colouration to the Eurasian magpie, because it was a common practice for early European settlers to name plants and animals after European counterparts. However, the Eurasian magpie is a member of the Corvidae, while its Australian counterpart is placed in the family Artamidae. They only share the same clade (Corvides). The affinity of the Australian magpie with butcherbirds and currawongs was recognised early, and John Albert Leach placed the three genera in the family Cracticidae in 1914, after he had studied their musculature. American ornithologists Charles Sibley and Jon Ahlquist recognised the close relationship between woodswallows and the butcherbirds in 1985, and combined them into a Cracticini clade, in the Artamidae.

The Australian magpie is placed in its own monotypic genus Gymnorhina, which was introduced by the English zoologist George Robert Gray in 1840. The name of the genus is from the Ancient Greek gumnos for "naked" or "bare" and rhis, rhinos "nostrils". Some authorities, such as Glen Storr in 1952 and Leslie Christidis and Walter Boles in their 2008 checklist, have placed the Australian magpie in the butcherbird genus Cracticus, arguing that its adaptation to ground-living is not enough to consider it a separate genus.

A molecular genetic study published in 2013 showed that the Australian magpie is a sister taxon to the black butcherbird (Melloria quoyi), and that the two species are in turn sister to a clade that includes the other butcherbirds in the genus Cracticus. The ancestor to the two species is thought to have split from the other butcherbirds between 8.3 and 4.2 million years ago, during the late Miocene to early Pliocene, while the two species themselves diverged sometime during the Pliocene (5.8–3.0 million years ago).

The Australian magpie was subdivided into three species in the literature for much of the twentieth century: the black-backed magpie (G. tibicen), the white-backed magpie (G. hypoleuca), and the western magpie (G. dorsalis). They were later noted to hybridise readily where their territories crossed, with hybrid grey or striped-backed magpies being quite common. They were reclassified as one species by Julian Ford in 1969, and most recent authors have followed suit.

=== Subspecies ===
There are currently thought to be nine subspecies of the Australian magpie, although there are large zones of overlap with intermediate forms between the taxa. There is a tendency for birds to become larger with increasing latitude, the southern subspecies being larger than those further north, except the Tasmanian form which is small. The original form, known as the black-backed magpie and classified as Gymnorhina tibicen, has been split into four black-backed races:

- G. tibicen tibicen, the nominate form, is a large subspecies found in southeastern Queensland, from the vicinity of Moreton Bay through eastern New South Wales to Moruya, New South Wales almost to the Victorian border. It is coastal or near-coastal and is restricted to east of the Great Dividing Range.
- G. tibicen terraereginae, found from Cape York and the Gulf Country southwards across Queensland to the coast between Halifax Bay in the north and south to the Mary River, and central and western New South Wales and into northern South Australia, is a small to medium-sized subspecies. The plumage is the same as that of subspecies tibicen, although the female has a shorter black tip to the tail. The wings and tarsus are shorter and the bill proportionally longer. It was originally described by Gregory Mathews in 1912, its subspecies name a Latin translation, terra "land" reginae "queen's" of "Queensland". Hybridisation with the large white-backed subspecies tyrannica occurs in northern Victoria and southeastern New South Wales; intermediate forms have black bands of varying sizes in white-backed area. Three-way hybridisation occurs between Bega and Batemans Bay on the New South Wales south coast.
- G. tibicen eylandtensis, the Top End magpie, is found from the Kimberley in northern Western Australia, across the Northern Territory through Arnhem Land and Groote Eylandt and into the Gulf Country. It is a small subspecies with a long and thinner bill, with birds of Groote Eylandt possibly even smaller than mainland birds. It has a narrow black terminal tailband, and a narrow black band; the male has a large white nape, the female pale grey. This form was initially described by H. L. White in 1922. It intergrades with subspecies terraereginae southeast of the Gulf of Carpentaria.
- G. tibicen longirostris, the long-billed magpie, is found across northern Western Australia, from Shark Bay into the Pilbara. Named in 1903 by Alex Milligan, it is a medium-sized subspecies with a long thin bill. Milligan speculated the bill may have been adapted for the local conditions, slim fare meaning the birds had to pick at dangerous scorpions and spiders. There is a broad area of hybridisation with the western dorsalis in southern central Western Australia from Shark Bay south to the Murchison River and east to the Great Victoria Desert.

The white-backed magpie, originally described as Gymnorhina hypoleuca by John Gould in 1837, has also been split into races:

- G. tibicen tyrannica, a very large white-backed form found from Twofold Bay on the New South Wales far south coast, across southern Victoria south of the Great Dividing Range through to the Coorong in southeastern South Australia. It was first described by Schodde and Mason in 1999. It has a broad black tail band.
- G. tibicen telonocua, found from Cowell south into the Eyre and Yorke Peninsulas in southern South Australia, as well as the southwestern Gawler Ranges. Described by Schodde and Mason in 1999, its subspecific name is an anagram of leuconota "white-backed". It is very similar to tyrannica, differing in having a shorter wing and being lighter and smaller overall. The bill is relatively short compared with other magpie subspecies. Intermediate forms are found in the Mount Lofty Ranges and on Kangaroo Island.
- G. tibicen hypoleuca now refers to a small white-backed subspecies with a short compact bill and short wings, found on King and Flinders Islands, as well as Tasmania.
- The western magpie, G. tibicen dorsalis was originally described as a separate species by A. J. Campbell in 1895 and is found in the fertile south-west corner of Western Australia. The adult male has a white back and most closely resembles subspecies telonocua, though it is a little larger with a longer bill and the black tip of its tail plumage is narrower. The female is unusual in that it has a scalloped black or brownish-black mantle and back; the dark feathers there are edged with white. This area appears a more uniform black as the plumage ages and the edges are worn away. Both sexes have black thighs.
- The New Guinean magpie, G. tibicen papuana, is a little-known subspecies found in southern New Guinea. The adult male has a mostly white back with a narrow black stripe, and the female a blackish back; the black feathers here are tipped with white similar to subspecies dorsalis. It has a long deep bill resembling that of subspecies longirostris. Genetically it is closely related to a western lineage of Australian magpies comprising subspecies dorsalis, longirostris and eylandtensis, suggesting their ancestors occupied in savannah country that was a land bridge between New Guinea and Australia and was submerged around 16,500 years ago.
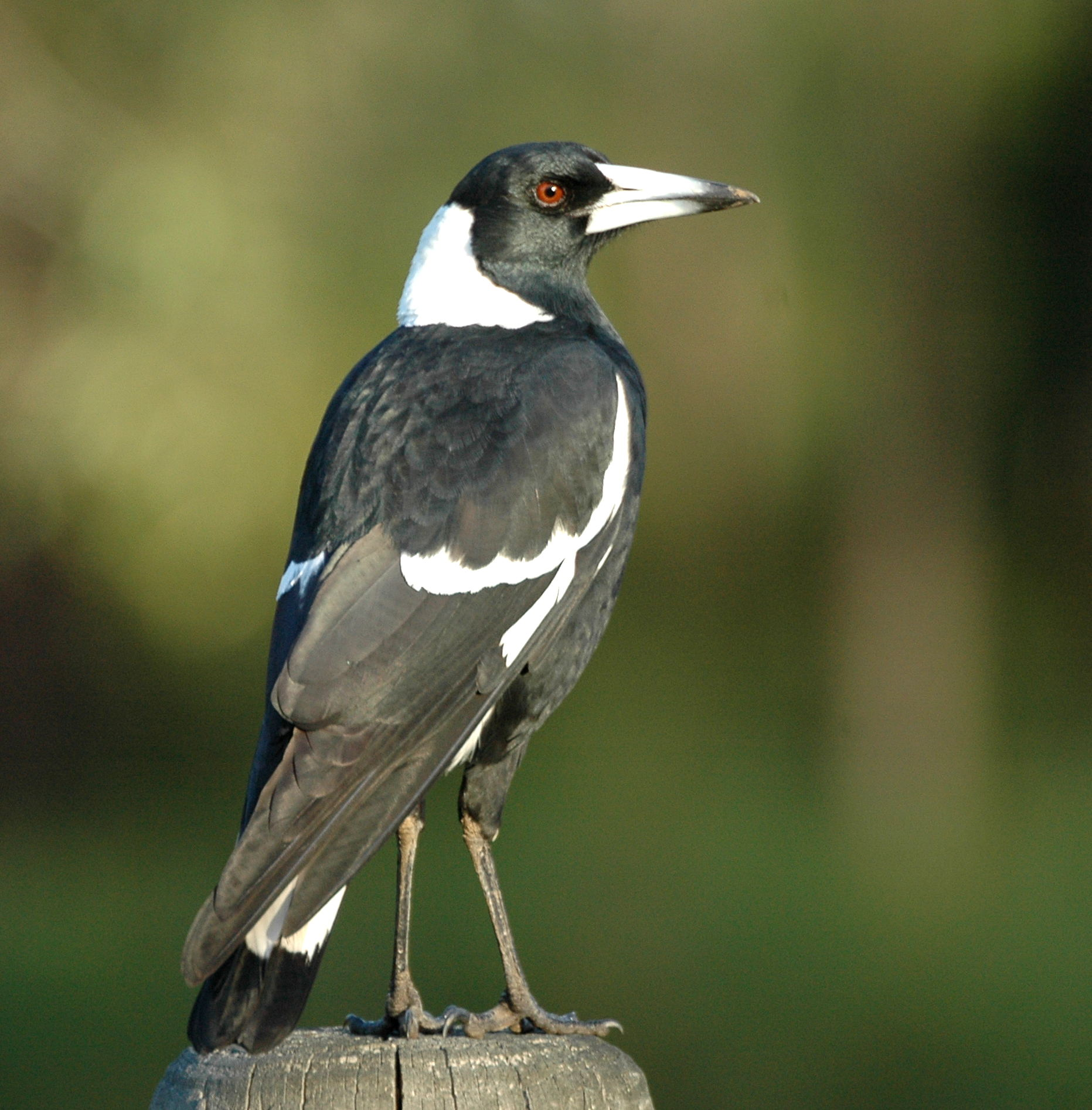
G. t. terraereginae
Queensland

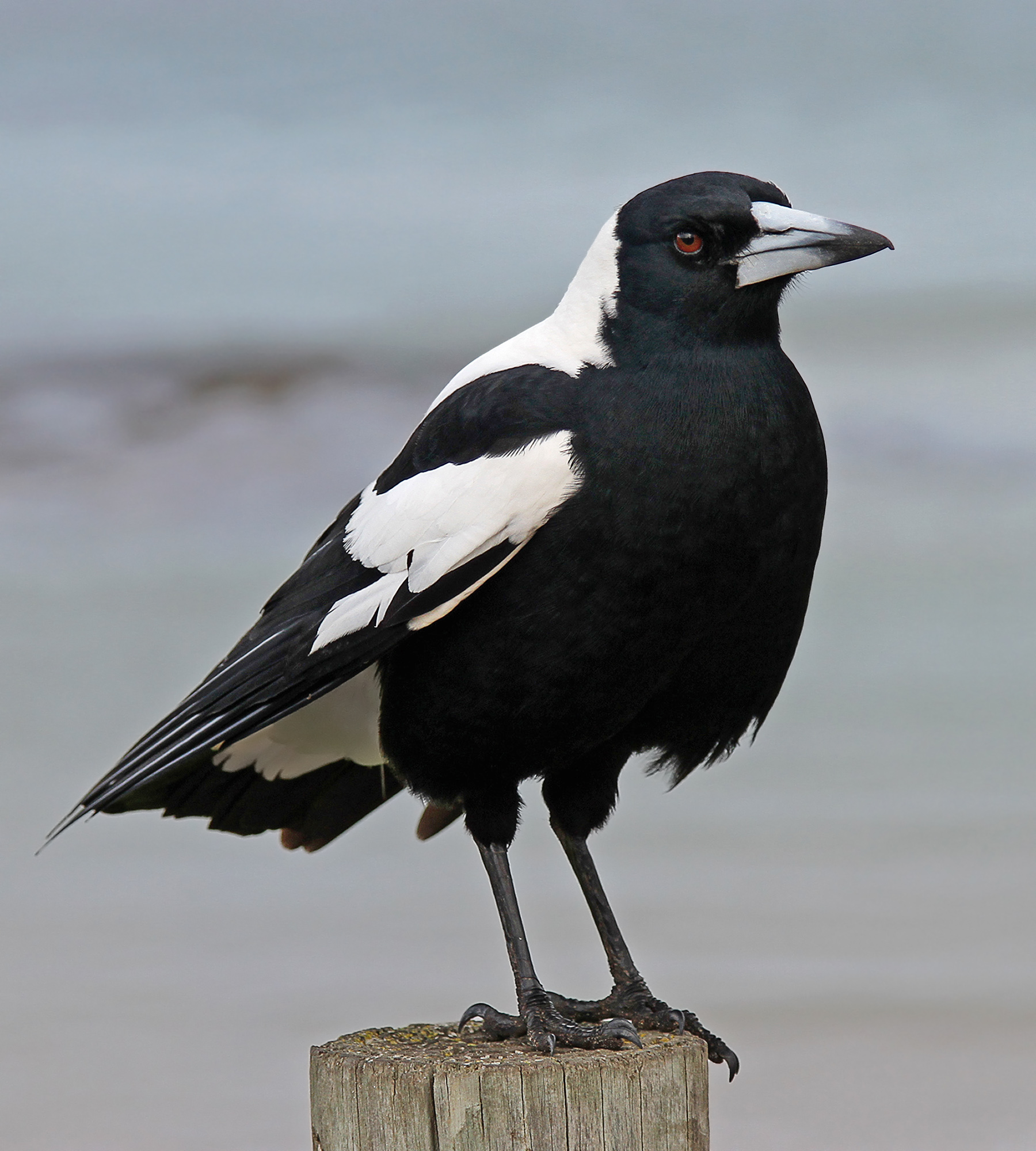
G. t. tyrannica
southern Victorian coast

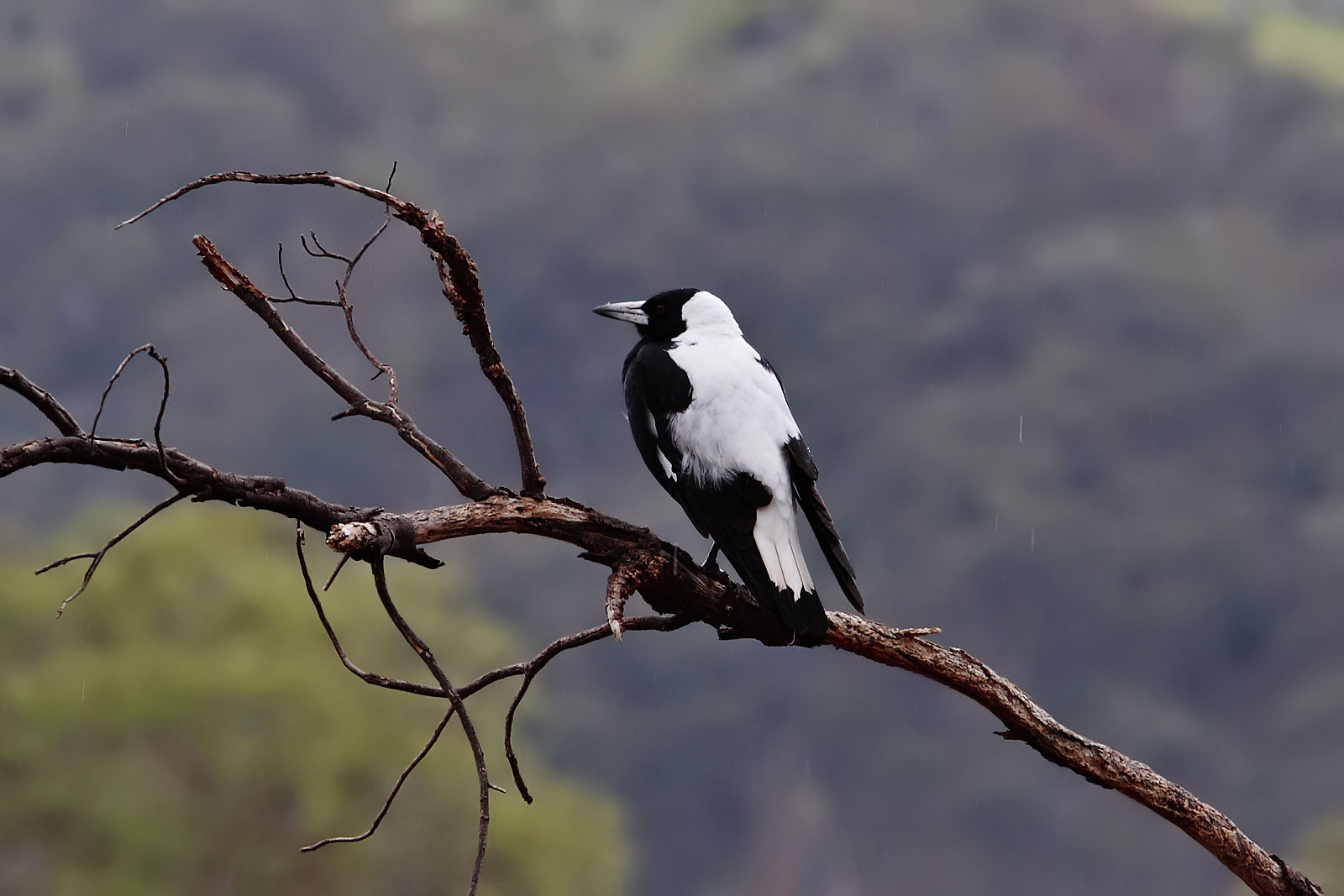
Male G. t. tyrannica
showing prominent white back

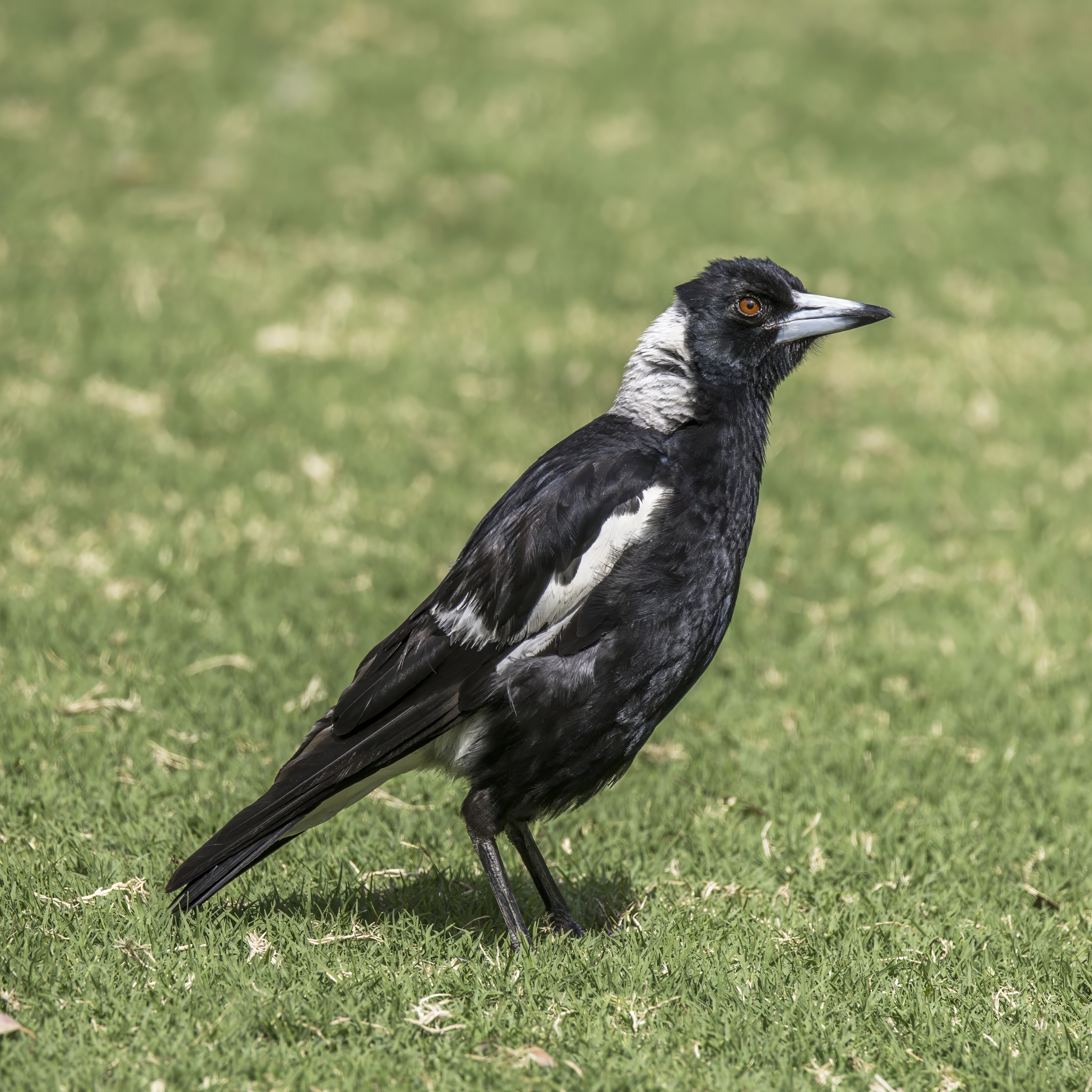
G. t. tibicen
Sydney, NSW

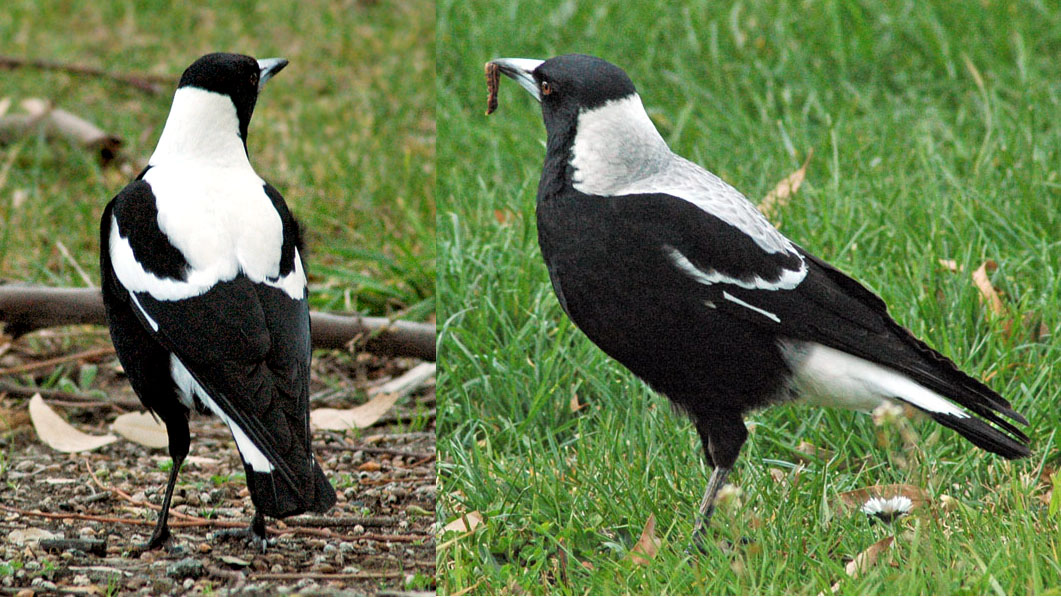
Male (left) and female (right) Tasmanian magpies

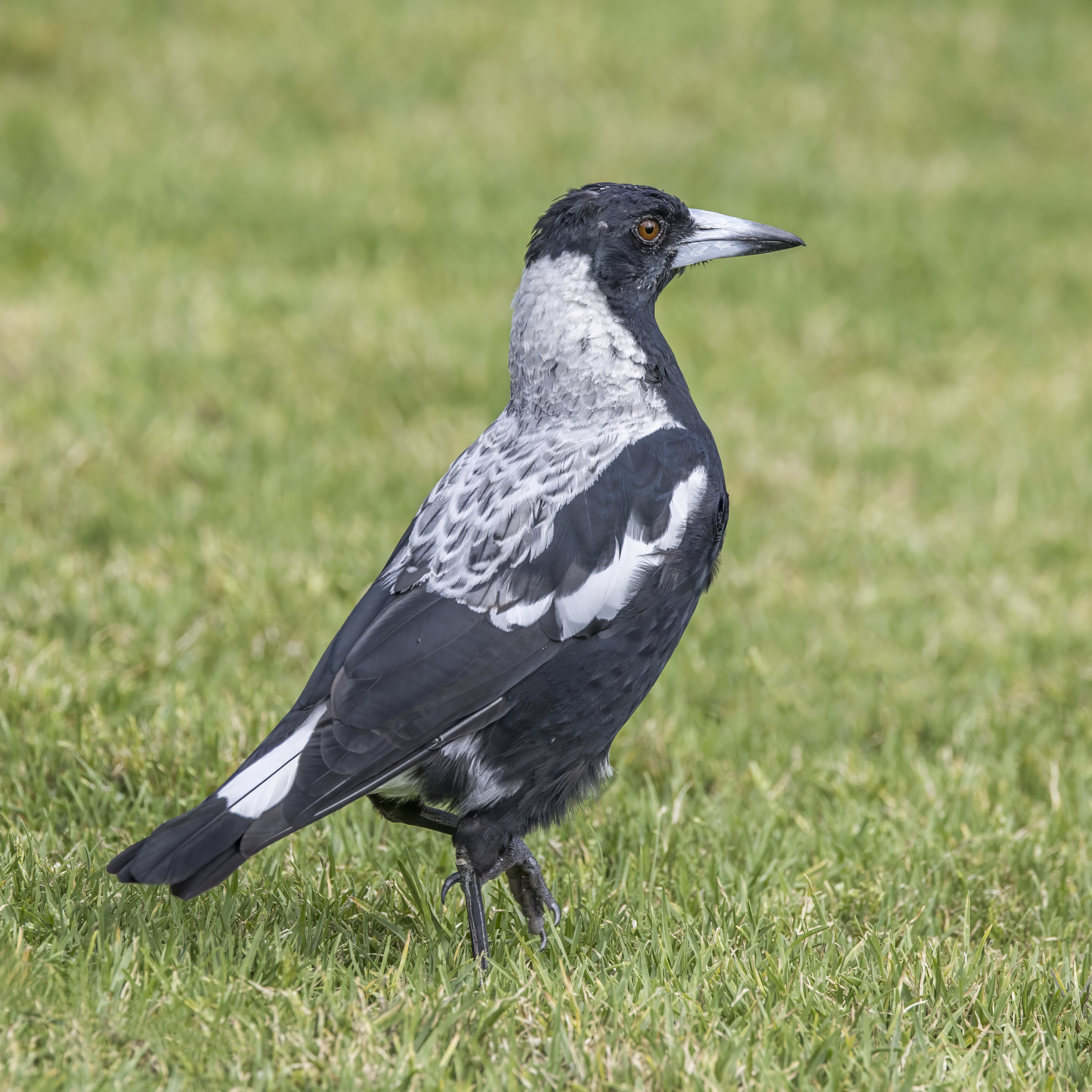
G. t. telonocua
Adelaide, SA

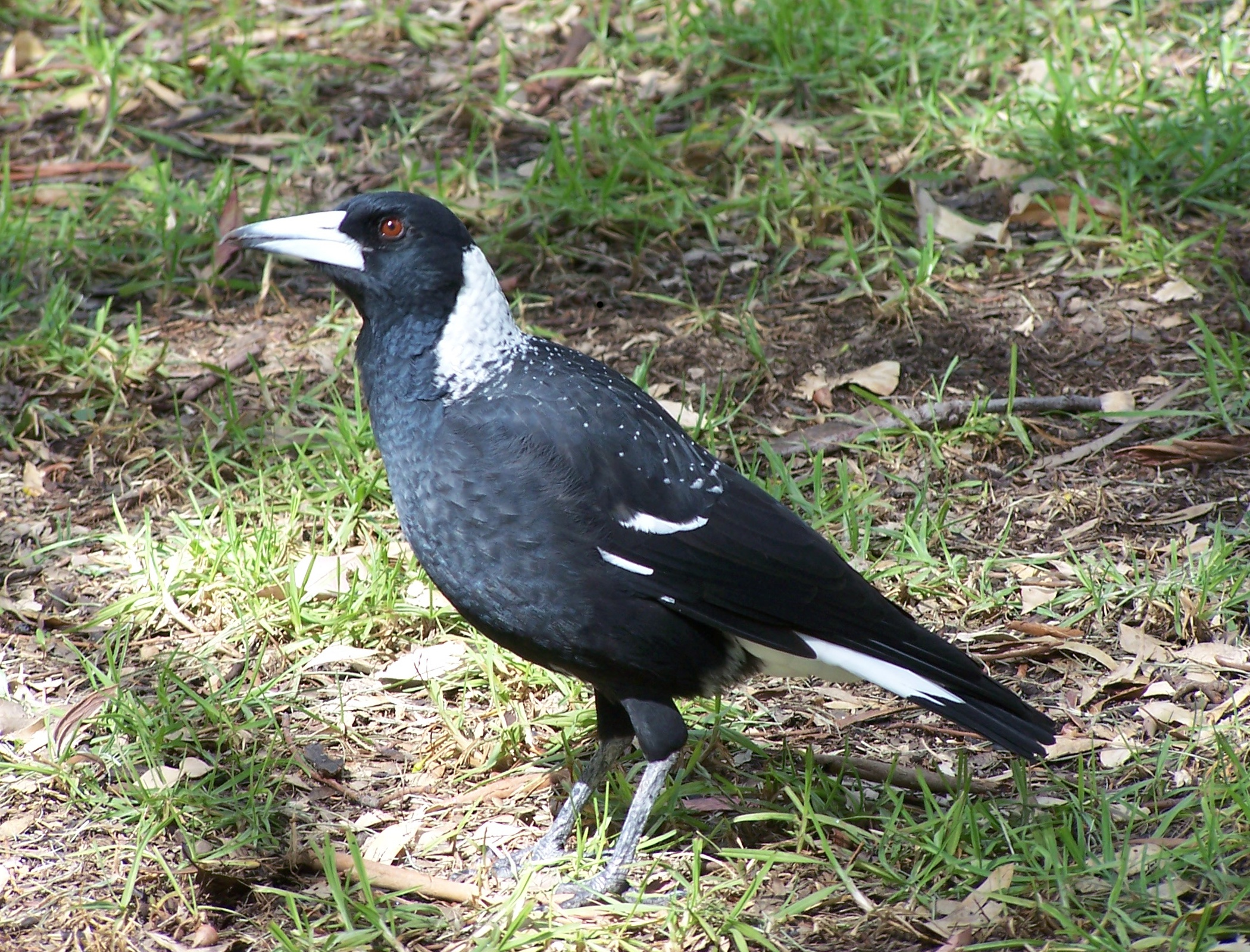
G. t. dorsalis, female
The plumage at the nape is a starker white in males

== Description ==
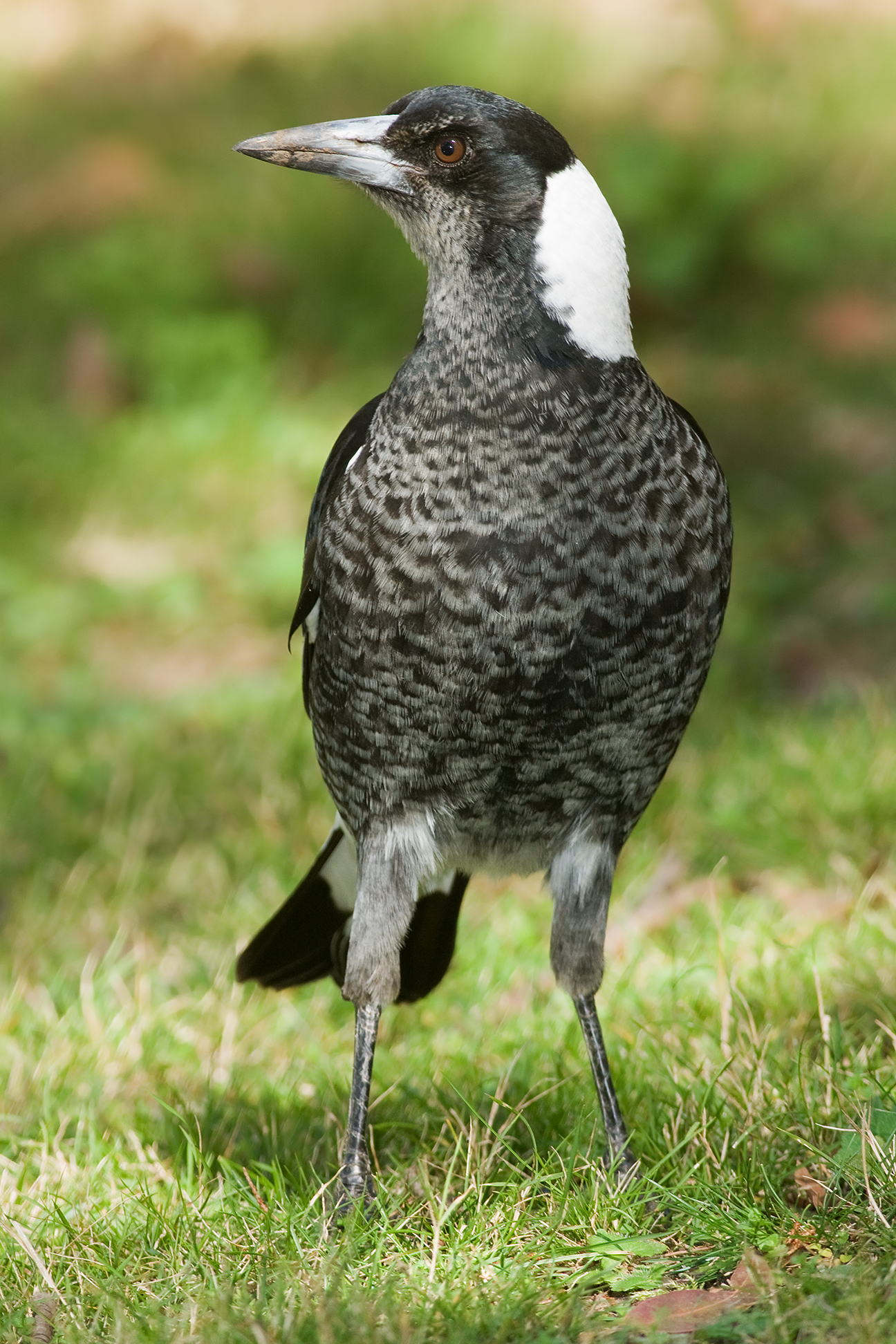
Immature, with dark irises and less distinct plumage, Australian National Botanic Gardens, Canberra

The adult magpie ranges from 37 to 43 cm (14.5 to 17 in) in length with a 65–85 cm (25.5–33.5 in) wingspan, and weighing 220–350 g (7.8–12.3 oz). Its robust wedge-shaped bill is bluish-white bordered with black, with a small hook at the tip. The black legs are long and strong. The plumage is pure glossy black and white; both sexes of all subspecies have black heads, wings and underparts with white shoulders. The tail has a black terminal band. The nape is white in the male and light greyish-white in the female. Mature magpies have dull red eyes, in contrast to the yellow eyes of currawongs and white eyes of Australian ravens and crows. The main difference between the subspecies lies in the "saddle" markings on the back below the nape. Black-backed subspecies have a black saddle and white nape. White-backed subspecies have a wholly white nape and saddle. The male Western Australian subspecies dorsalis is also white-backed, but the equivalent area in the female is scalloped black.

Juveniles have lighter greys and browns amidst the starker blacks and whites of their plumage; two- or three-year-old birds of both sexes closely resemble and are difficult to distinguish from adult females. Immature birds have dark brownish eyes until around two years of age. Australian magpies generally live to around 25 years of age, though ages of up to 30 years have been recorded. The reported age of first breeding has varied according to area, but the average is between three and five years.

Well-known and easily recognisable, the Australian magpie is unlikely to be confused with any other species. The pied butcherbird has a similar build and plumage, but has white underparts unlike the former species' black underparts. The magpie-lark is a much smaller and more delicate bird with complex and very different banded black and white plumage. Currawong species have predominantly dark plumage and heavier bills.

=== Magpie Sounds ===
The "gargled" vocalisations of the Australian magpie.

A Juvenile Australian Magpie Begging

Australian Magpie Carolling

Problems listening to the files? See Wikipedia media help.

One of Australia's most highly regarded songbirds, the Australian magpie has a wide variety of calls, many of which are complex. Pitch may vary as much as four octaves, and the bird can mimic over 35 species of native and introduced bird species, as well as dogs and horses. Magpies have even been noted to mimic human speech when living in close proximity to humans. Its complex, musical, warbling call is one of the most familiar Australian bird sounds. In Denis Glover's poem "The Magpies", the mature magpie's call is described as quardle oodle ardle wardle doodle, one of the most famous lines in New Zealand poetry, and as waddle giggle gargle paddle poodle, in the children's book Waddle Giggle Gargle by Pamela Allen. The bird has been known to mimic environmental sounds as well, including the noises made by emergency vehicles during the 2019-20 "Black Summer" bushfire season.

When alone, a magpie may make a quiet musical warbling; these complex melodious warbles or subsongs are pitched at 2–4 KHz and do not carry for long distances. These songs have been recorded as being up to 70 minutes long, and are more frequent after the end of the breeding season. Pairs of magpies often take up a loud musical calling known as carolling to advertise or defend their territory; one bird initiates the call with the second (and sometimes more) joining in. Often preceded by warbling, carolling is pitched between 6 and 8 kHz and has 4–5 elements with slurring indistinct noise in between. Birds adopt a specific posture by tilting their heads back, expanding their chests, and moving their wings backwards. A group of magpies sing a short repetitive version of carolling just before dawn (dawn song), and at twilight after sundown (dusk song), in winter and spring.

Fledgling and juvenile magpies emit a repeated short and loud (80 dB), high-pitched (8 kHz) begging call. Magpies may indulge in beak-clapping to warn other species of birds. They employ several high pitched (8–10 kHz) alarm or rallying calls when intruders or threats are spotted. Distinct calls have been recorded for the approach of eagles and monitor lizards.

A trio of Australian magpies break into song

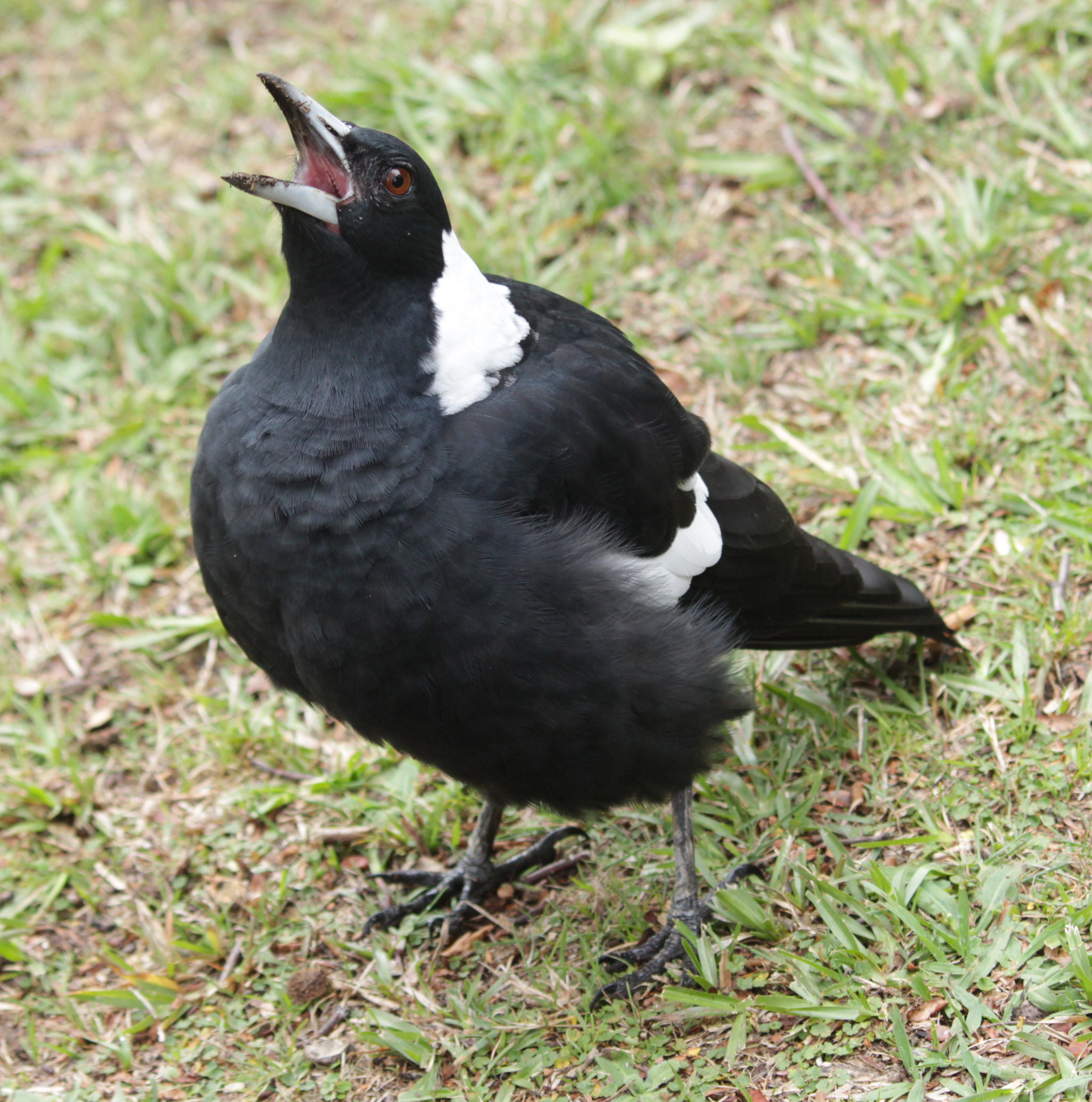
Magpie in an aggressive display and call

A breeding pair(female has some grey feathers in lower white neck patch) and a juvenile chick from last season (Note chick only starts feeding after the adults).

== Distribution and habitat ==
The Australian magpie is found in the Trans-Fly region of southern New Guinea, between the Oriomo River and Muli Strait, and across most of Australia, bar the tip of Cape York, the Gibson and Great Sandy Deserts, and the southwest of Tasmania.

The Australian magpie prefers open areas such as grassland, fields and residential areas such as parks, gardens, golf courses, and streets, with scattered trees or forest nearby. Birds nest and shelter in trees but forage mainly on the ground in these open areas. It has also been recorded in mature pine plantations; birds only occupy rainforest and wet sclerophyll forest in the vicinity of cleared areas. In general, evidence suggests the range and population of the Australian magpie has increased with land-clearing, although local declines in Queensland due to a 1902 drought, and in Tasmania in the 1930s have been noted; the cause for the latter is unclear but rabbit baiting, pine tree removal, and spread of the masked lapwing (Vanellus miles) have been implicated.

=== New Zealand ===
Birds taken mainly from Tasmania and Victoria were introduced into New Zealand by local Acclimatisation Societies of Otago and Canterbury in the 1860s, with the Wellington Acclimatisation Society releasing 260 birds in 1874. White-backed forms are spread on both the North and eastern South Island, while black-backed forms are found in the Hawke's Bay region. Magpies were introduced into New Zealand to control agricultural pests, and were therefore a protected species until 1951. They are thought to affect native New Zealand bird populations such as the tūī and kererū, sometimes raiding nests for eggs and nestlings, although studies by Waikato University have cast doubt on this, and much blame on the magpie as a predator in the past has been anecdotal only. Introductions also occurred in the Solomon Islands and Sri Lanka, although the species has failed to become established. It has become established in western Taveuni in Fiji, however.

== Behaviour ==
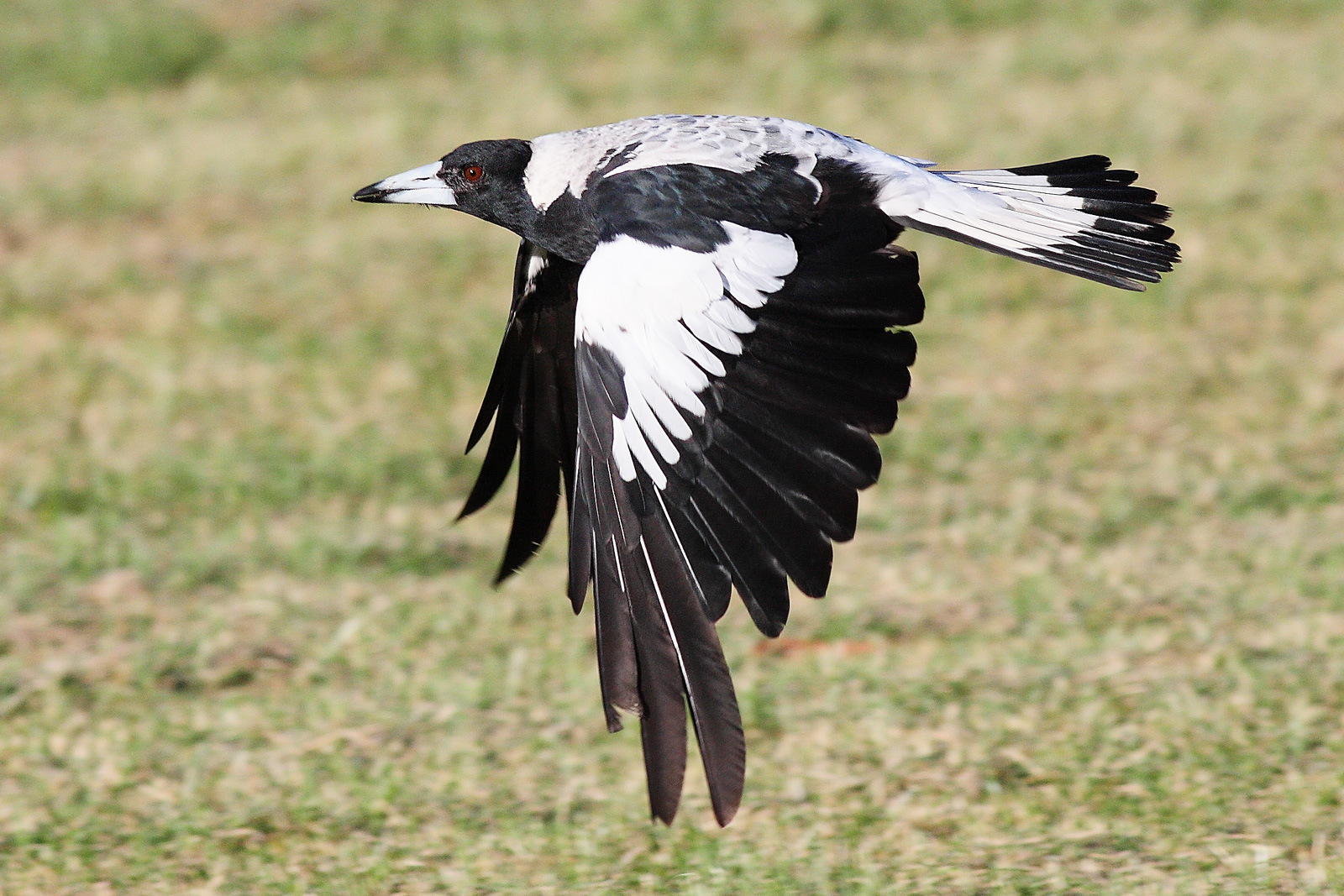
Female, subsp. tyrannica, in flight

Australian magpie vocalising and then flying off.

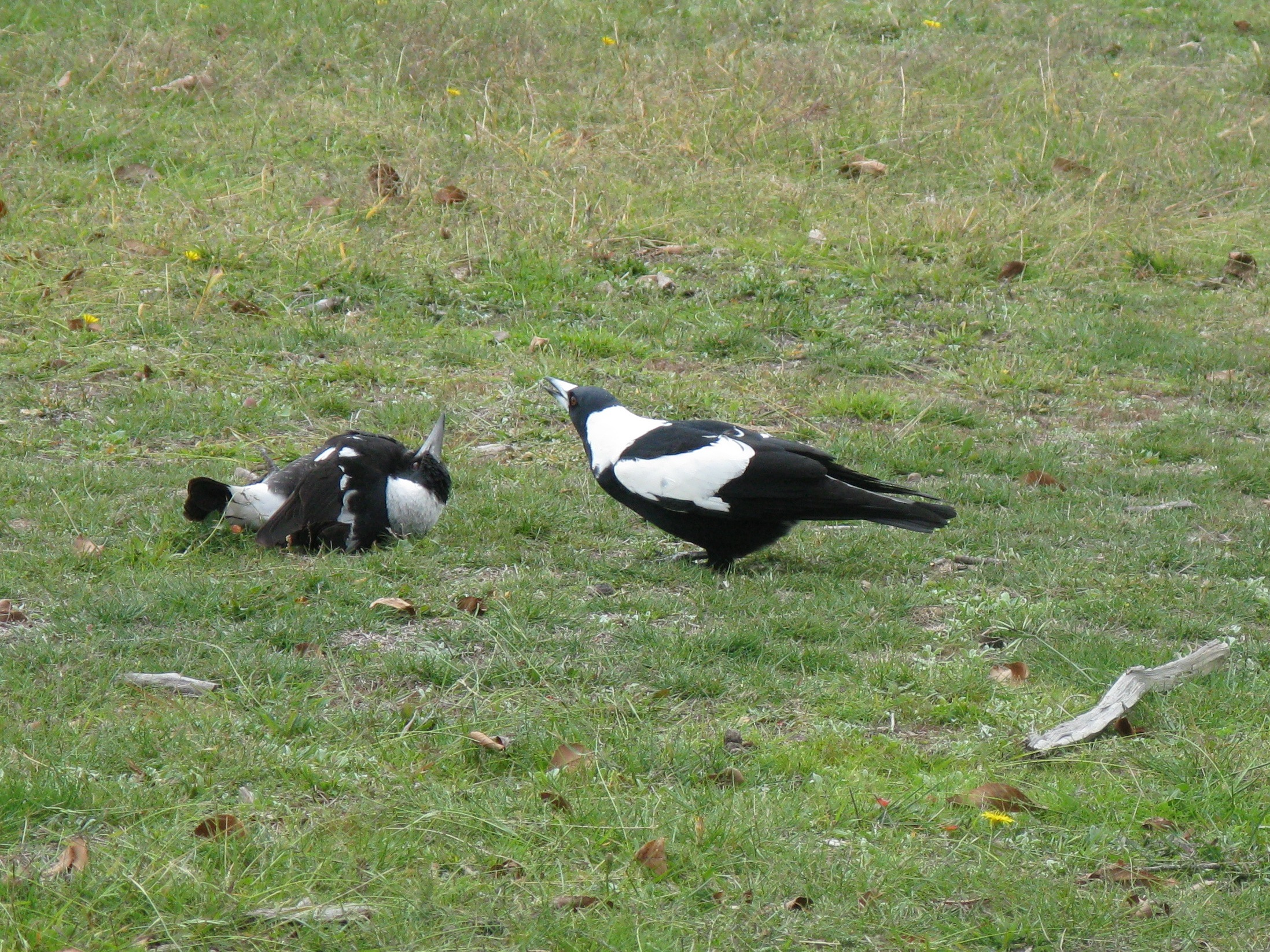
Submissive juvenile

The Australian magpie is almost exclusively diurnal, although it may call into the night, like some other members of the Artamidae. Natural predators of magpies include various species of snakes, monitor lizard and barking owl. Birds are often killed on roads or electrocuted by powerlines, or poisoned after killing and eating house sparrows, mice, rats or rabbits that have eaten poison bait. The Australian raven may take nestlings left unattended.

On the ground, the Australian magpie moves around by walking, and is the only member of the Artamidae to do so; woodswallows, butcherbirds and currawongs all tend to hop with legs parallel. The magpie has a short femur (thigh bone), and long lower leg below the knee, suited to walking rather than running, although birds can run in short bursts when hunting prey.

The magpie is generally sedentary and territorial throughout its range, living in groups occupying a territory, or in flocks or fringe groups. A group may occupy and defend the same territory for many years. Much energy is spent defending a territory from intruders, particularly other magpies, and different behaviours are seen with different opponents. The sight of a raptor results in a rallying call by sentinel birds and subsequent coordinated mobbing of the intruder. Magpies place themselves either side of the bird of prey so that it will be attacked from behind should it strike a defender, and harass and drive the raptor to some distance beyond the territory. A group will use carolling as a signal to advertise ownership and warn off other magpies. In the negotiating display, the one or two dominant magpies parade along the border of the defended territory while the rest of the group stand back a little and look on. The leaders may fluff their feathers or caroll repeatedly. In a group strength display, employed if both the opposing and defending groups are of roughly equal numbers, all magpies will fly and form a row at the border of the territory. The defending group may also resort to an aerial display where the dominant magpies, or sometimes the whole group, swoop and dive while calling to warn an intruding magpie's group.

A wide variety of displays are seen, with aggressive behaviours outnumbering pro-social ones. Crouching low and uttering quiet begging calls are common signs of submission. The manus flutter is a submissive display where a magpie will flutter the primary feathers in its wings. A magpie, particularly a juvenile, may also fall, roll over on its back and expose its underparts. Birds may fluff up their flank feathers as an aggressive display or preceding an attack. Young birds display various forms of play behaviour, either by themselves or in groups, with older birds often initiating the proceedings with juveniles. These may involve picking up, manipulating or tugging at various objects such as sticks, rocks or bits of wire, and handing them to other birds. A bird may pick up a feather or leaf and fly off with it, with other birds pursuing and attempting to bring down the leader by latching onto its tail feathers. Birds may jump on each other and even engage in mock fighting. Play may even take place with other species such as blue-faced honeyeaters and Australasian pipits.

A 2022 study showed cooperative behaviour, along with a moderate level of problem-solving, when magpies (G. tibicen) assisted one another to remove tracking devices placed on their bodies in a specially designed harness by researchers for conservation purposes. This was the first recorded example of birds acting in this way to remove tracking devices, a form of rescue behaviour.

=== Breeding ===
Magpies have a long breeding season which varies in different parts of the country; in northern parts of Australia they will breed between June and September, but not commence until August or September in cooler regions, and may continue until January in some alpine areas. The nest is a bowl-shaped structure made of sticks and lined with softer material such as grass and bark. Near human habitation, synthetic material may be incorporated. Nests are built exclusively by females and generally placed high up in a tree fork, often in an exposed position. The trees used are most commonly eucalypts, although a variety of other native trees as well as introduced pine, Crataegus, and elm have been recorded. Other bird species, such as the yellow-rumped thornbill (Acanthiza chrysorrhoa), willie wagtail (Rhipidura leucophrys), southern whiteface (Aphelocephala leucopsis), and (less commonly) noisy miner (Manorina melanocephala), often nest in the same tree as the magpie. The first two species may even locate their nest directly beneath a magpie nest, while the diminutive striated pardalote (Pardalotus striatus) has been known to make a burrow for breeding into the base of the magpie nest itself. These incursions are all tolerated by the magpies. The channel-billed cuckoo (Scythrops novaehollandiae) is a notable brood parasite in eastern Australia; magpies will raise cuckoo young, which eventually outcompete the magpie nestlings.

The Australian magpie produces a clutch of two to five light blue or greenish eggs, which are oval in shape and about 30 by 40 mm (1.2 by 1.6 in). The chicks hatch synchronously around 20 days after incubation begins; like all passerines, the chicks are altricial—they are born pink, naked, and blind with large feet, a short broad beak and a bright red throat. Their eyes are fully open at around 10 days. Chicks develop fine downy feathers on their head, back and wings in the first week, and pinfeathers in the second week. The black and white colouration is noticeable from an early stage. Nestlings are usually fed exclusively by the female, though the male magpie will feed his partner. Individual males do feed nestlings and fledglings, to varying degrees, from sporadic to equal frequency to the female. The Australian magpie is known to engage in cooperative breeding, and helper birds will assist in feeding and raising young. This does vary from region to region, and with the size of the group—the behaviour is rare or non-existent in pairs or small groups.

Juvenile magpies begin foraging on their own three weeks after leaving the nest, and mostly feeding themselves by six months old. Some birds continue begging for food until eight or nine months of age, but are usually ignored. Birds reach adult size by their first year. The age at which young birds disperse varies across the country, and depends on the aggressiveness of the dominant adult of the corresponding sex; males are usually evicted at a younger age. Many leave at around a year old, but the age of departure may range from eight months to four years.

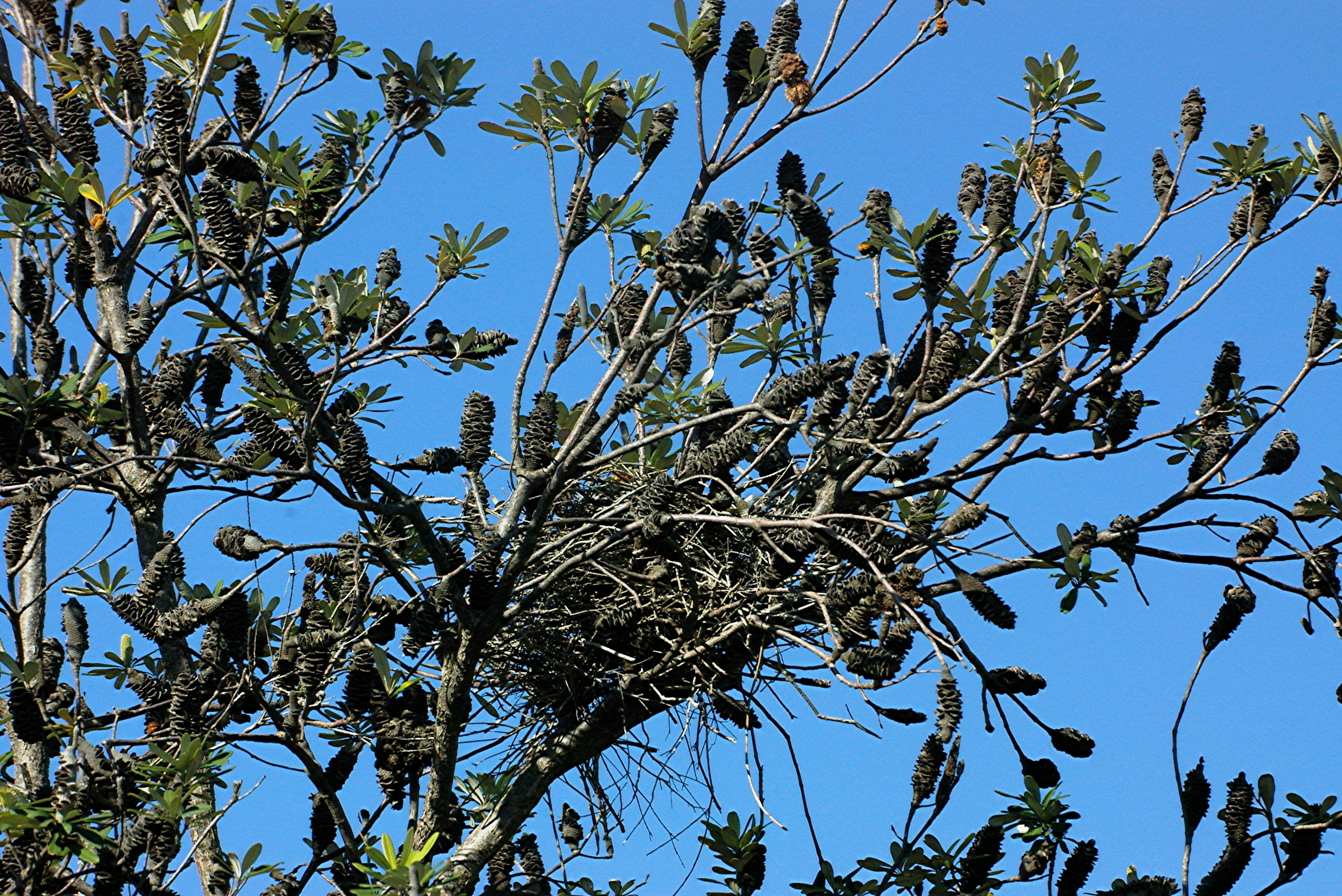
Nest in a banksia tree

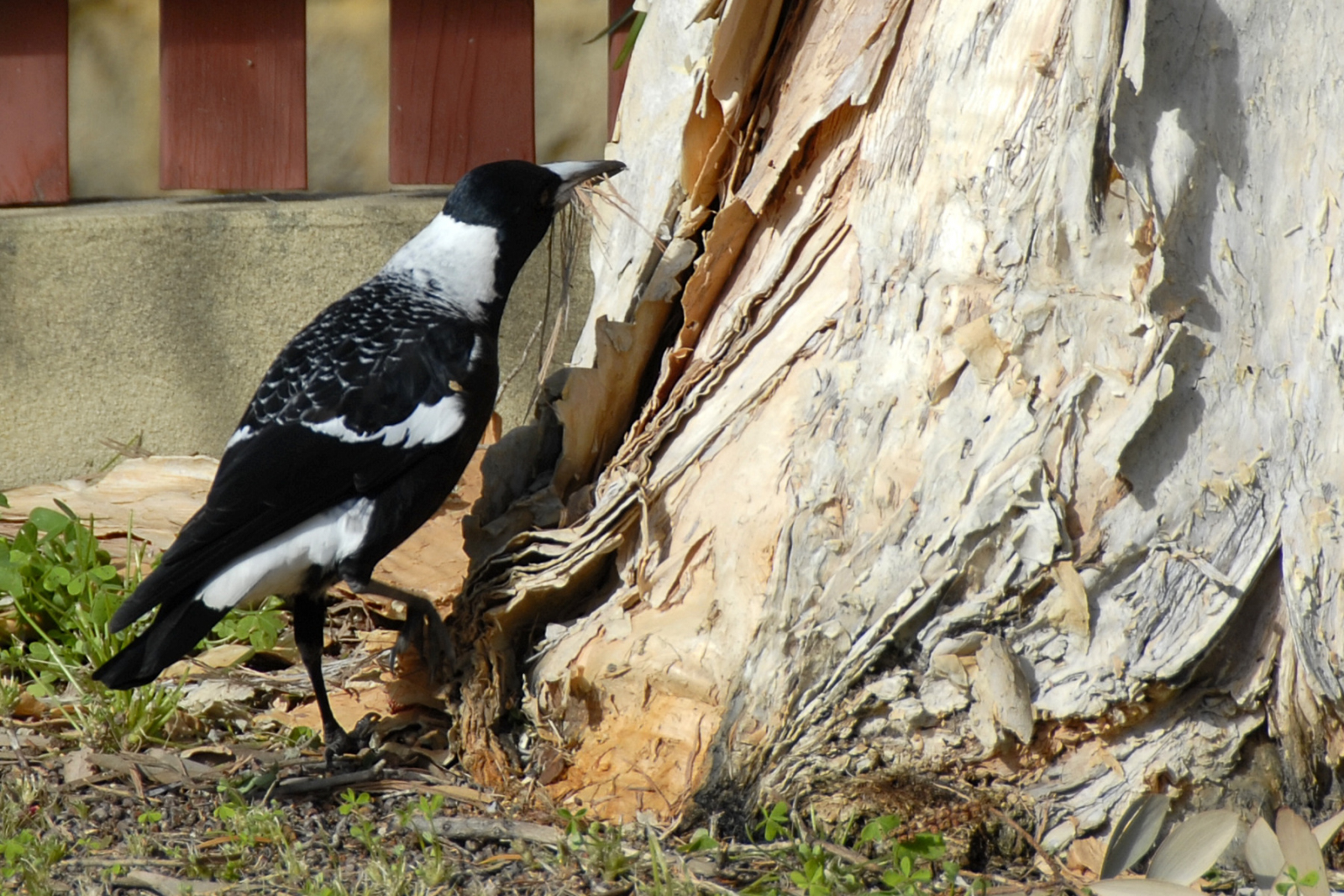
Western magpie female (note scalloped back) collecting nesting material

=== Feeding ===
The Australian magpie is omnivorous, eating various items located at or near ground level including invertebrates such as earthworms, millipedes, snails, spiders and scorpions as well as a wide variety of insects—cockroaches, ants, earwigs, beetles, cicadas, moths and caterpillars and other larvae. Insects, including large adult grasshoppers, may be seized mid-flight. Skinks, frogs, small birds, mice and other small animals as well as carrion, grain, tubers, figs and walnuts have also been noted as components of their diet.

It has even learnt to safely eat the poisonous cane toad by flipping it over and consuming the underparts. Predominantly a ground feeder, the Australian magpie paces open areas methodically searching for insects and their larvae. One study showed birds were able to find scarab beetle larvae by sound or vibration. Birds use their bills to probe into the earth or otherwise overturn debris in search of food. Smaller prey are swallowed whole, although magpies rub off the stingers of bees, stinging ants and wasps and irritating hairs of caterpillars before swallowing.

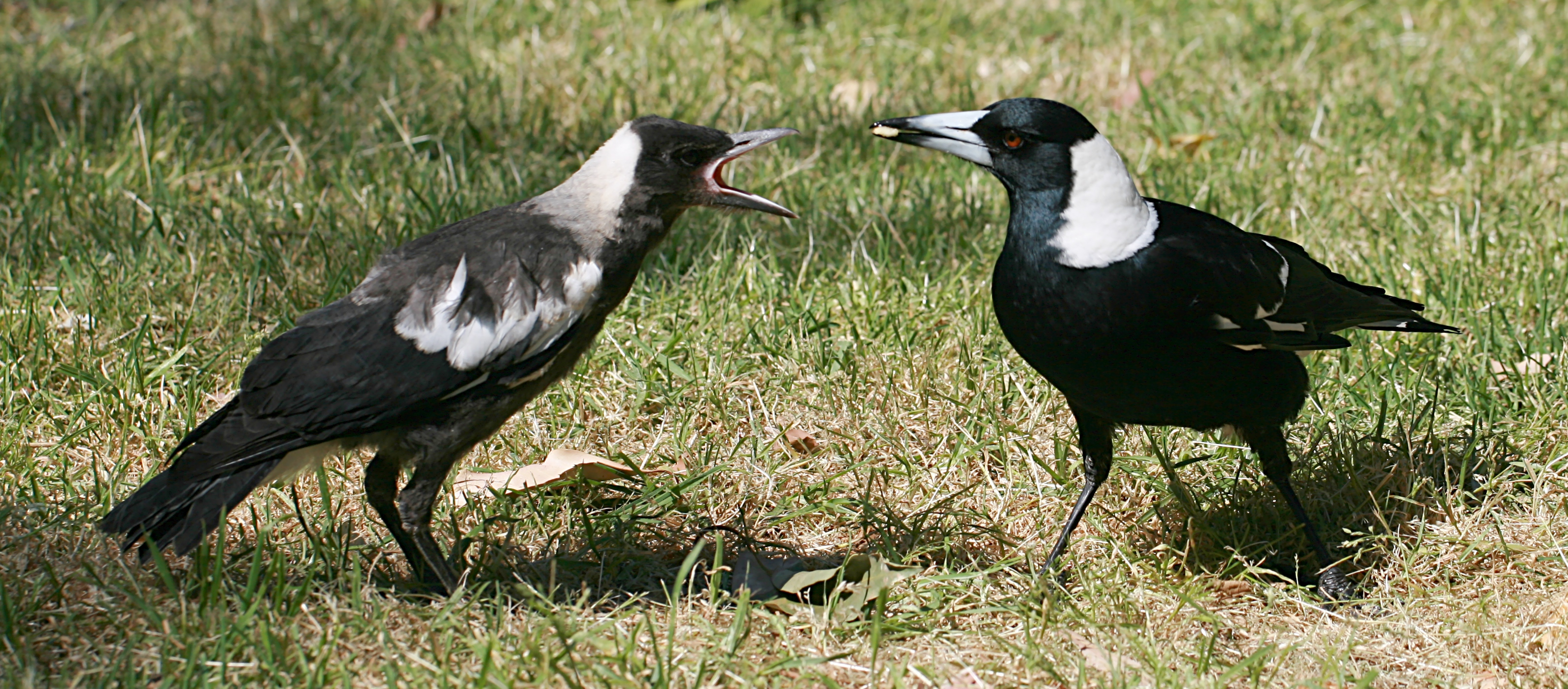
A juvenile begs for food from its father.

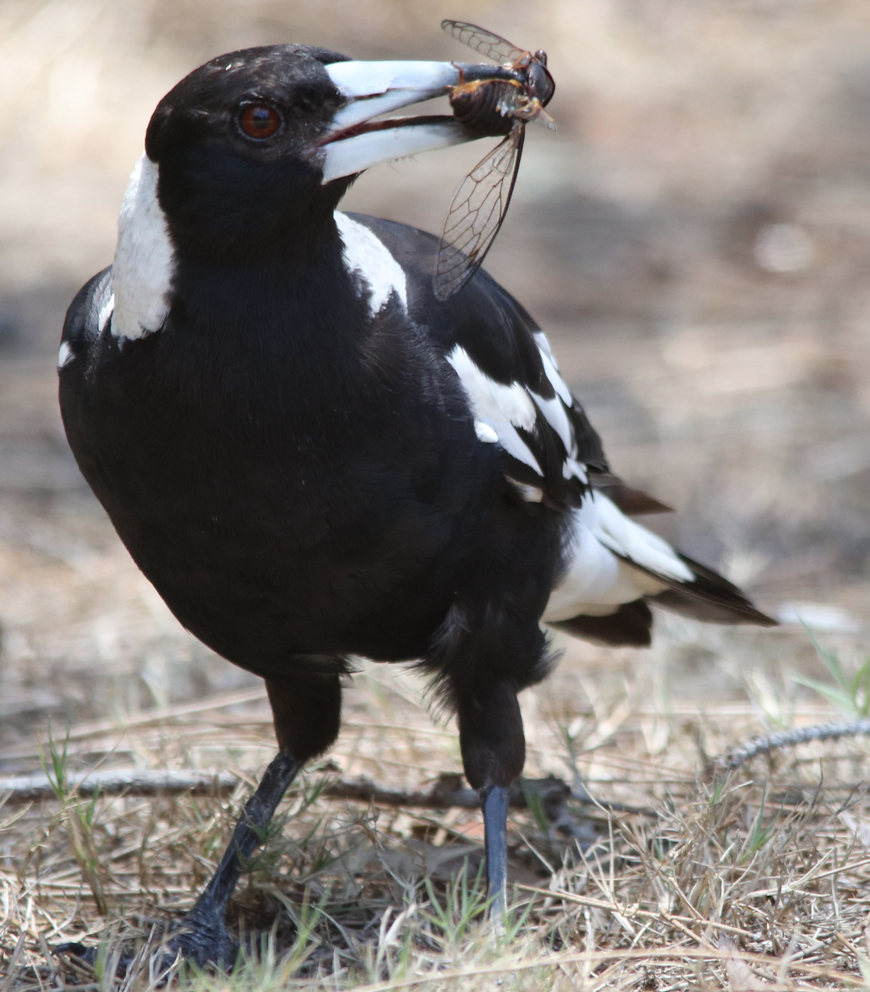
With a cicada at Church Point

== Swooping ==
Magpies are ubiquitous in urban areas all over Australia, and have become accustomed to people. A small percentage of birds become highly aggressive during breeding season from late August to late November – early December or occasionally late February to late April – early May, and will swoop and sometimes attack passersby. Attacks begin as the eggs hatch, increase in frequency and severity as the chicks grow, and tail off as the chicks leave the nest.

Magpie attacks occur in most parts of Australia, though Tasmanian magpies are much less aggressive than their mainland counterparts. Magpie attacks can cause injuries, typically wounds to the head. Being unexpectedly swooped while cycling can result in loss of control of the bicycle, which may cause injury or even fatal accidents.

Magpies may engage in an escalating series of behaviours to drive off intruders. Least threatening are alarm calls and distant swoops, where birds fly within several metres from behind and perch nearby. Next in intensity are close swoops, where a magpie will swoop in from behind or the side and audibly "snap" their beaks or even peck or bite at the face, neck, ears or eyes. More rarely, a bird may dive-bomb and strike the intruder's (usually a cyclist's) head with its chest. A magpie may rarely attack by landing on the ground in front of a person and lurching up and landing on the victim's chest and pecking at the face and eyes.

=== Targets ===
The percentage of magpies that swoop has been difficult to estimate but is less than 9%. Almost all attacking birds (around 99%) are male, and they are generally known to attack pedestrians at around 50 m (160 ft) from their nest, and cyclists at around 100 m (330 ft). There appears to be some specificity in choice of attack targets, with the majority of individuals specialising on either pedestrians or cyclists.

Younger people, lone people, and people travelling quickly (i.e., runners and cyclists) appear to be targeted most often by swooping magpies. Anecdotal evidence suggests that if a magpie sees a human trying to rescue a chick that has fallen from its nest, the bird will view this help as predation, and will become more aggressive to humans from then on. Some attacks have indirectly been fatal. For example, in 2021, a Brisbane woman tripped and fell onto her infant while attempting to avoid a swooping, and the infant died.

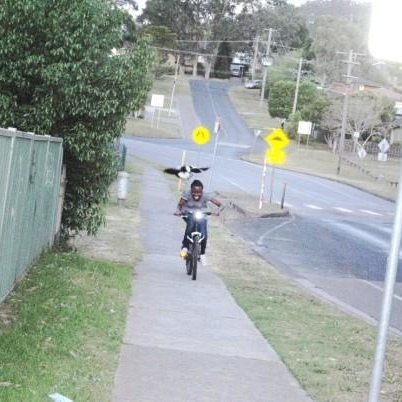
A territorial magpie swoops a cyclist.

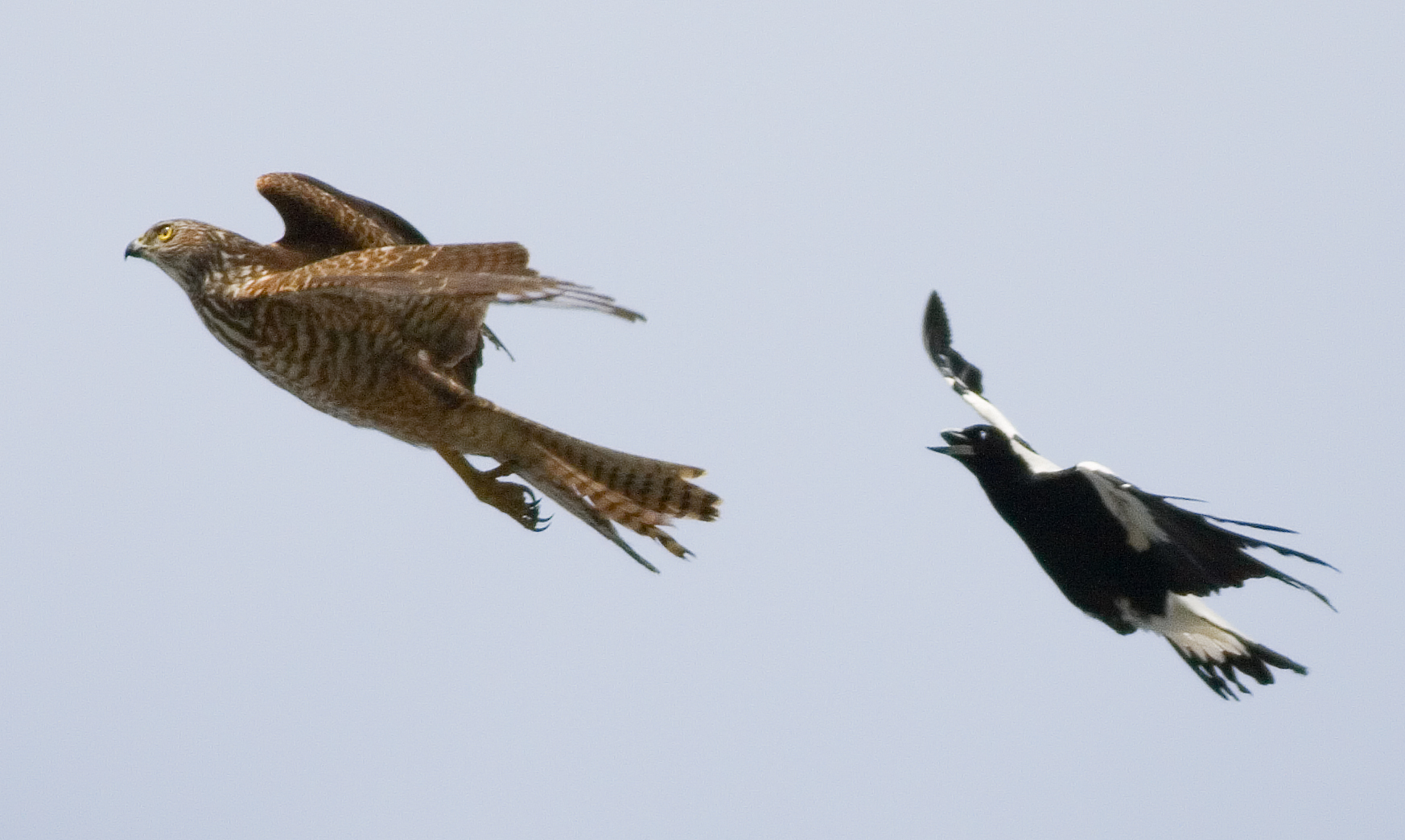
A magpie defending its territory from a brown goshawk

=== Prevention ===
Magpies are a protected native species in Australia, so it is illegal to kill or harm them. However, some states provide exceptions for a magpie that attacks a human, allowing a particularly aggressive bird to be killed. Such a provision is made, for example, in section 54 of the South Australian National Parks and Wildlife Act. More commonly, an aggressive bird will be caught and relocated to an unpopulated area. Magpies have to be moved a considerable distance, as almost all are able to find their way home from distances of less than 25 km (16 mi). Removing the nest is of no use, as birds will breed again and possibly be more aggressive the second time around.

If it is necessary to walk near the nest, wearing a broad-brimmed or legionnaire's hat or using an umbrella will deter attacking birds, but beanies and bicycle helmets are of little value, as birds attack the sides of the head and neck. Magpies prefer to swoop at the back of the head; therefore, keeping the magpie in sight at all times can discourage the bird. A basic disguise such as sunglasses worn on the back of the head may fool the magpie as to where a person is looking. Eyes painted on hats or helmets will deter attacks on pedestrians but not cyclists. Cyclists can deter attack by attaching a long pole with a flag to a bike, and the use of cable ties on helmets has become common and appears to be effective.

Some claim that hand-feeding magpies can reduce the risk of swooping. Magpies will become accustomed to being fed by humans, and although they are wild, will return to the same place looking for handouts. The idea is that humans thereby appear less of a threat to the nesting birds. Although this has not been studied systematically, there are reports of its success.

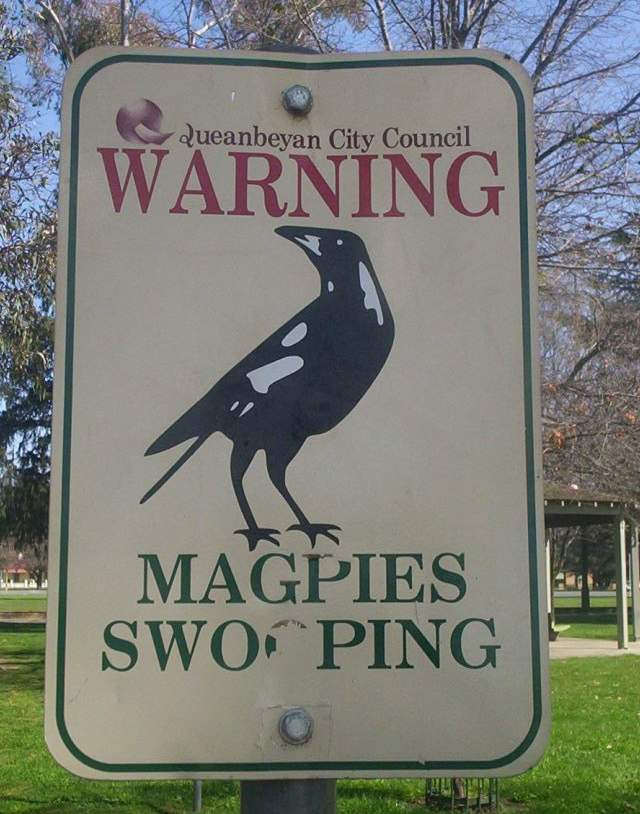
Magpie swooping sign at Queanbeyan, NSW

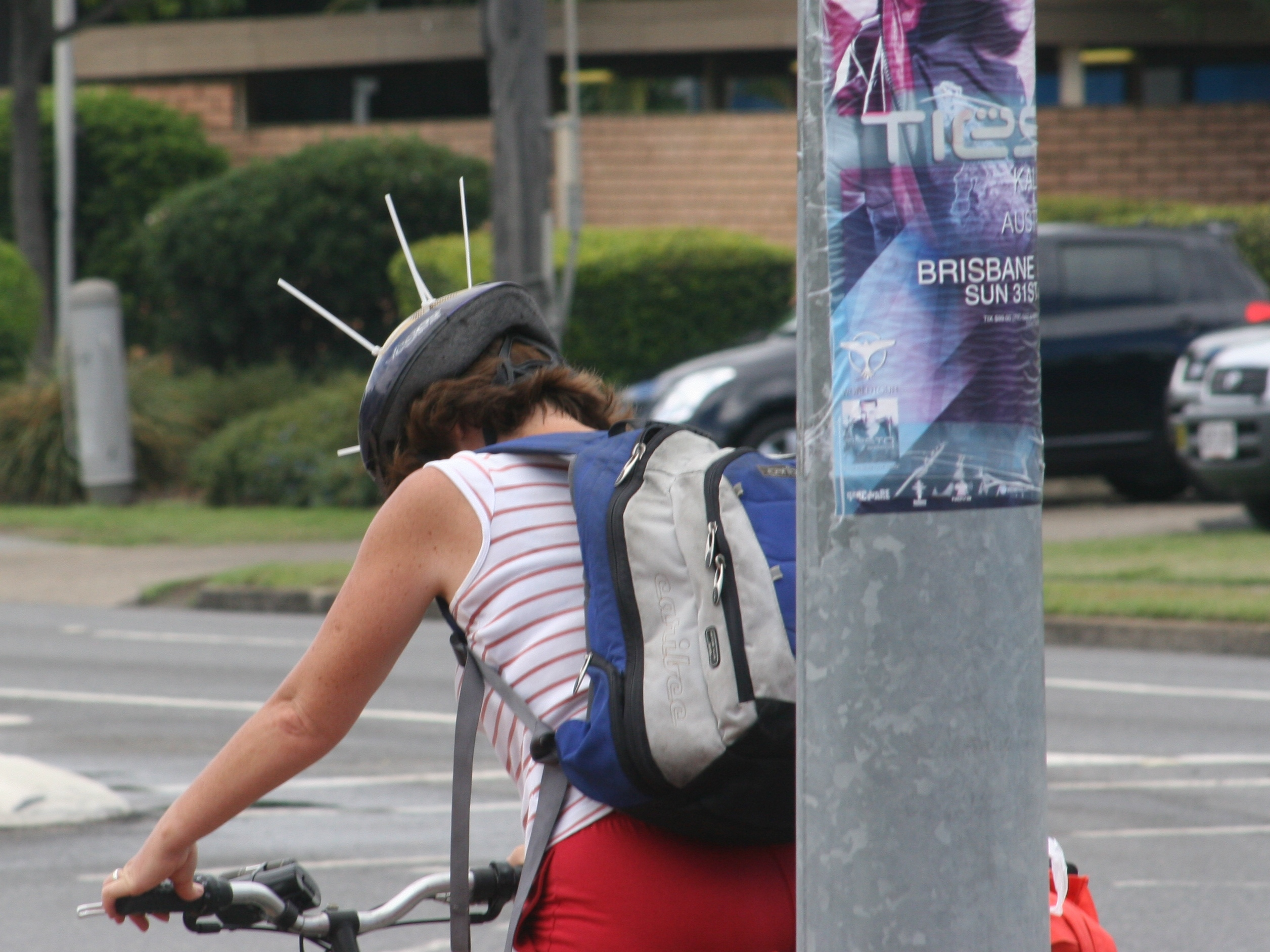
Cyclist wearing a helmet with "spikes" to ward off diving magpies

Hand-feeding an Australian magpie

== Cultural references ==
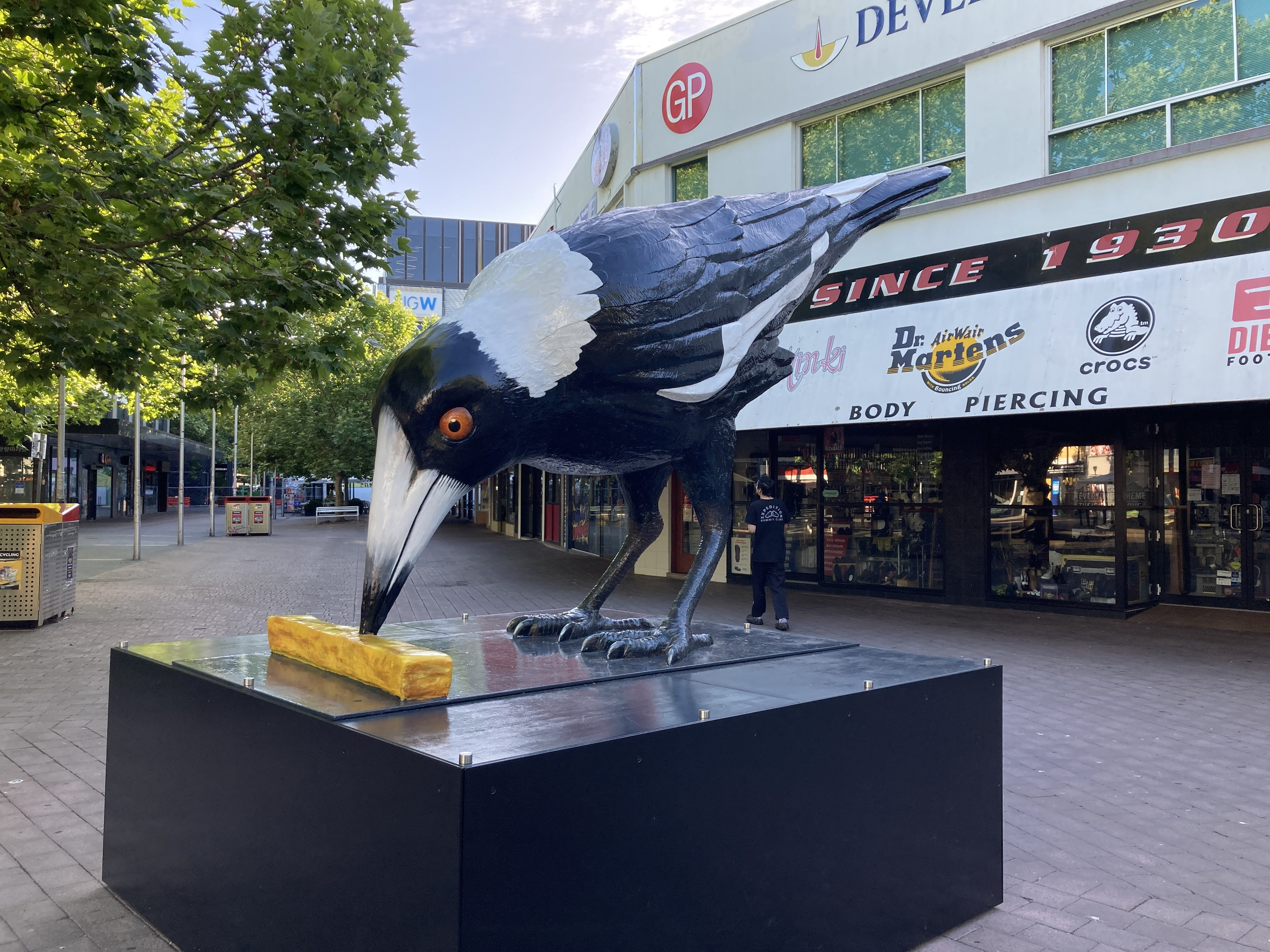
The sculpture Big Swoop in central Canberra. It depicts one of the magpies that live in the city centre.

The Australian magpie featured in aboriginal folklore around Australia. The Yindjibarndi people of the Pilbara in the northwest of the country used the bird as a signal for sunrise, awakening them with its call. They were also familiar with its highly territorial nature, and it features in a song in their Burndud, or songs of customs. It was a totem bird of the people of the Illawarra region south of Sydney.

Under the name piping shrike, the white-backed magpie was declared the official emblem of the Government of South Australia in 1901 by Governor Tennyson, and has featured on the South Australian flag since 1904. The magpie is a commonly used emblem of sporting teams in Australia, and its brash, cocky attitude has been likened to the Australian psyche. Such teams tend to wear uniforms with black and white stripes. The Collingwood Football Club adopted the magpie from a visiting South Australian representative team in 1892. The Port Adelaide Magpies would likewise adopt the black and white colours and Magpie name in 1902. Other examples include Brisbane's Souths Logan Magpies and Sydney's Western Suburbs Magpies. Disputes over who has been the first club to adopt the magpie emblem have been heated at times. Another club, Glenorchy Football Club of Tasmania, was forced to change uniform design when placed in the same league as another club (Claremont Magpies) with the same emblem.

In New Zealand, the Hawke's Bay Rugby Union team, from Napier, New Zealand, is also known as the magpies. One of the best-known New Zealand poems is "The Magpies" by Denis Glover, with its refrain "Quardle oodle ardle wardle doodle", imitating the sound of the bird – and the popular New Zealand comic Footrot Flats features a magpie character by the name of Pew. Other magpies depicted in fiction include: Magpie in Colin Thiele's 1974 children's book Magpie Island, Miss Magpie in The Adventures of Blinky Bill, and Penguin the magpie in Penguin Bloom. The sculpture Big Swoop in central Canberra was installed in Garema Place on 16 March 2022. The Australian Magpie won the inaugural Australian Bird of the Year poll conducted by Guardian Australia and BirdLife Australia in late 2017. The Australian magpie won the 2017 contest with 19,926 votes (13.3%), narrowly ahead of the Australian white ibis. The magpie slumped to fourth place in the 2019 poll, and to ninth place in the 2021 poll. The voting rules changed in all three years of the Bird of the Year poll, which may have affected the results. The magpie also won a 2023 ABC Science poll for Australia's favourite animal sound.

== See also ==
- Australian magpies in New Zealand
- Birds of Australia
- Windsor Road Monster
