= Australian Bird of the Year =

Bird of the Year competition

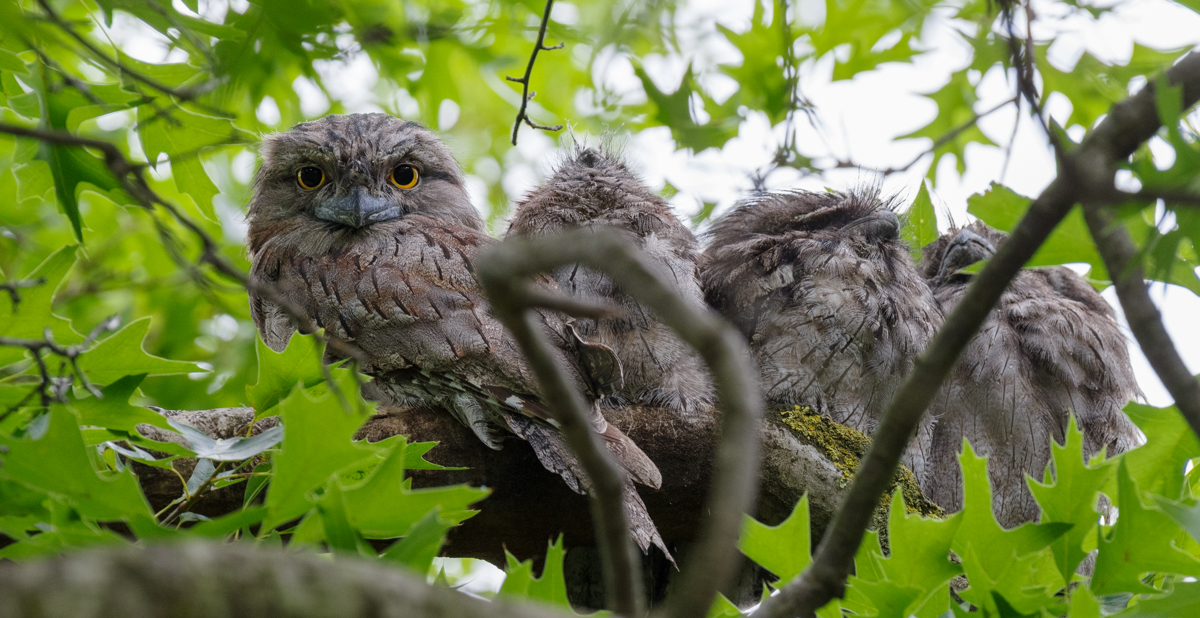
- 2025 winner tawny frogmouth
- Country: Australia
- Presented by: Guardian Australia
- First award: 2017; 9 years ago
- Website: Australian Bird of the Year

Australian Bird of the Year is a biennial poll organised by Guardian Australia and BirdLife Australia. Members of the public are invited to vote for their favourite Australian birds in an online poll. The intention behind the competition is to celebrate Australian wildlife, add enjoyment to news cycles, and bring awareness to bird conservation and endangered species. Several Australian politicians participate in the polls by endorsing their favourite birds, including prime minister Anthony Albanese.

BirdLife Australia previously held its own poll in 2013, with the superb fairywren declared the winner. Passerines and parrots often dominate the polls. The first winner of the Australian Bird of the Year was the Australian magpie in 2017, while the most recent was the tawny frogmouth in 2025, which was the runner-up in the three preceding polls. More than 310,000 votes were cast in 2025.

== Winners ==
Year	Winner			Runner-up		Ref.
Year	Photograph	Name	Votes	Name	Votes	Ref.
2017	Australian magpie	Australian magpie	19,926 (13.3%)	Australian white ibis	19,083 (12.7%)	
2019	Black-throated finch	Black-throated finch	11,153 (35%)	Tawny frogmouth	3,351 (10%)	
2021	Superb fairywren	Superb fairywren	13,998	Tawny frogmouth	13,332	
2023	Swift parrot	Swift parrot	11,171	Tawny frogmouth	10,729	
2025	Tawny frogmouth	Tawny frogmouth	11,851	Baudin's black cockatoo	7,688	
