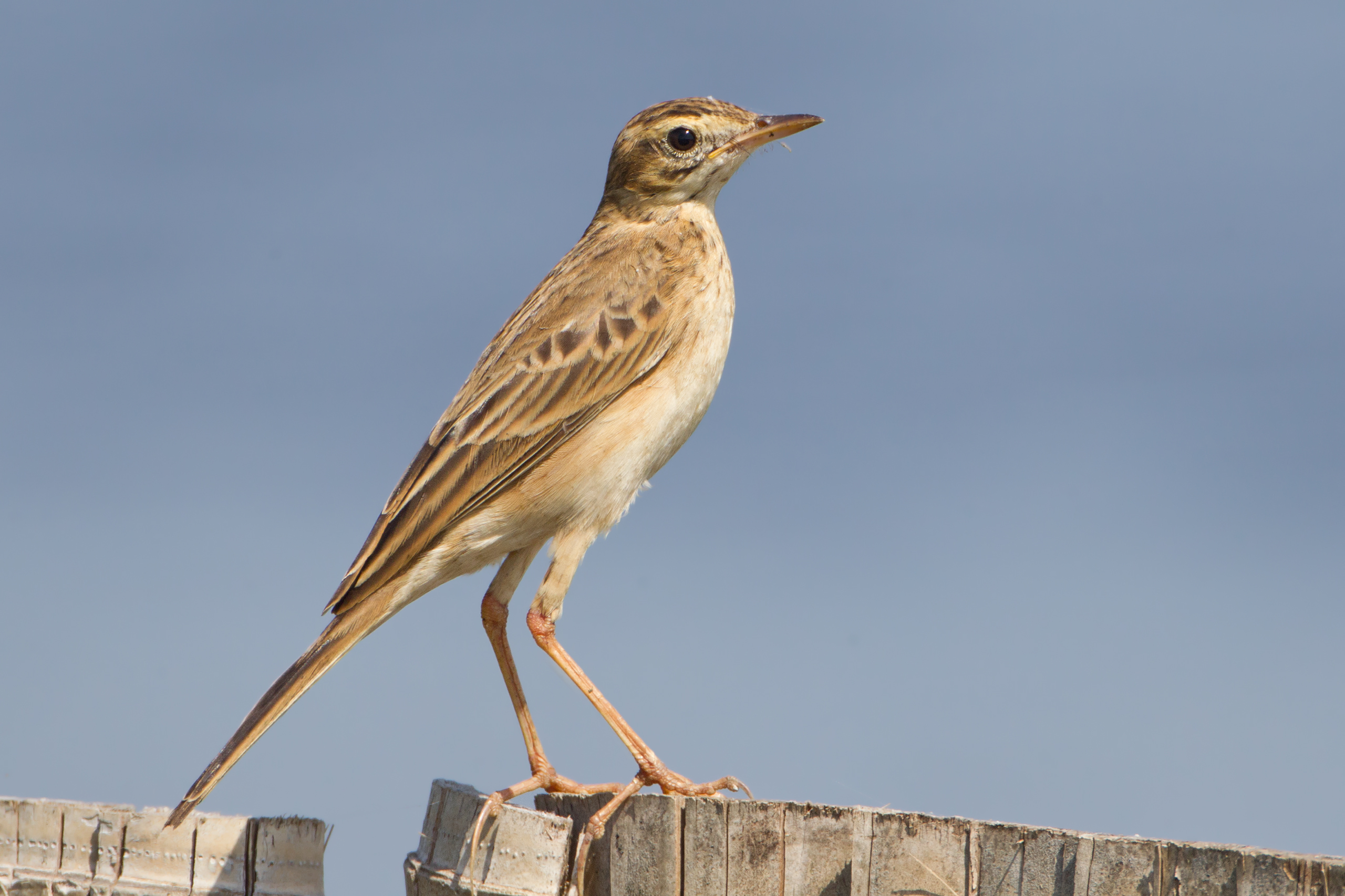
- In Thailand

Conservation status
- Least Concern (IUCN 3.1)

Scientific classification
- Kingdom: Animalia
- Phylum: Chordata
- Class: Aves
- Order: Passeriformes
- Family: Motacillidae
- Genus: Anthus
- Species: A. richardi

Binomial name
- Anthus richardi Vieillot, 1818

= Richard's pipit =

Species of bird

Richard's pipit (Anthus richardi) is a medium-sized passerine bird which breeds in open grasslands in the East Palearctic. It is a long-distance migrant moving to open lowlands in the Indian subcontinent and Southeast Asia. It is a rare but regular vagrant to western Europe.

The genus name Anthus is the Latin name for a small bird of grasslands. The English name and richardi are for the French naturalist Charles Richard (1745–1835), director of postal services at Lunéville and friend of Francois Levaillant.

It belongs to the pipit genus Anthus in the family Motacillidae. It was formerly lumped together with the Australasian, African, mountain and paddyfield pipits in a single species: Richard's pipit, Anthus novaeseelandiae. These pipits are now commonly considered to be separate species although the African and paddyfield pipits are sometimes treated as part of A. richardi.

== Description ==
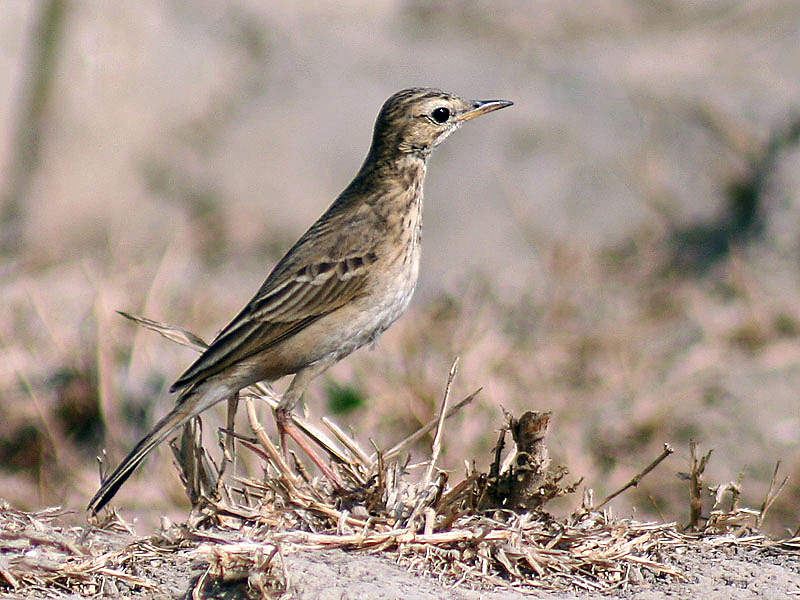
Near Hodal in Haryana, India

This is a large pipit, 17–20 cm in length, with a weight of 25–36 g and a wingspan of 29 to 33 cm. It is a slender bird which often stands very upright. It has long yellow-brown legs, a long tail with white outer-feathers and a long dark bill with a yellowish base to the lower mandible. The hindclaw is long and fairly straight. It is an undistinguished-looking species on the ground, mainly brown above and pale below. There are dark streaks on the upperparts and breast while the belly and flanks are plain. The face is strongly marked with pale lores and supercilium and dark eyestripe, moustachial stripe and malar stripe. There are two wingbars formed by pale tips to the wing-coverts.

There is some variation between the different subspecies. A. r. sinensis is slightly smaller than the nominate race with less streaking above. A. r. centralasiae is larger with more sand-coloured upperparts. A. r. dauricus has more streaking above.

Its flight is strong and undulating, and it gives a characteristic explosive "shreep" call, somewhat similar to the chirp of a house sparrow. The song is a repeated series of monotonous buzzy notes given in an undulating song-flight.

Some care must be taken to distinguish this from other large pipits which winter or are resident in the area, such as Blyth's pipit and paddyfield pipit. Blyth's pipit has a shorter bill, legs and tail, a shorter and more curved hindclaw, less white on the tail and more streaking on the upperparts. In adult birds, the median wing-coverts have blunt-ended dark centres whereas in Richard's pipit the dark centres become pointed towards the tip of the feather. The call of Blyth's pipit call is quieter and less harsh. Paddyfield pipit is smaller than Richard's pipit with a shorter bill and tail, less streaking on the breast and a quieter call.

== Distribution and habitat ==
Richard's pipit breeds in southern Siberia, Mongolia, parts of Central Asia and in northern, central and eastern China. It migrates south to winter in the Indian subcontinent and South-east Asia with records as far south as Sri Lanka, Singapore and northern Borneo. It is a scarce passage migrant in Korea and Japan. A small part of the population regularly moves west in autumn and birds have been recorded from most countries in Europe, the Middle East and North Africa. It is seen annually between September and November at coastal watchpoints in areas such as Britain, the Netherlands and Scandinavia with occasional birds appearing in spring. A few overwinter in countries like Spain, Portugal, Italy and Morocco.

== Behaviour and ecology ==
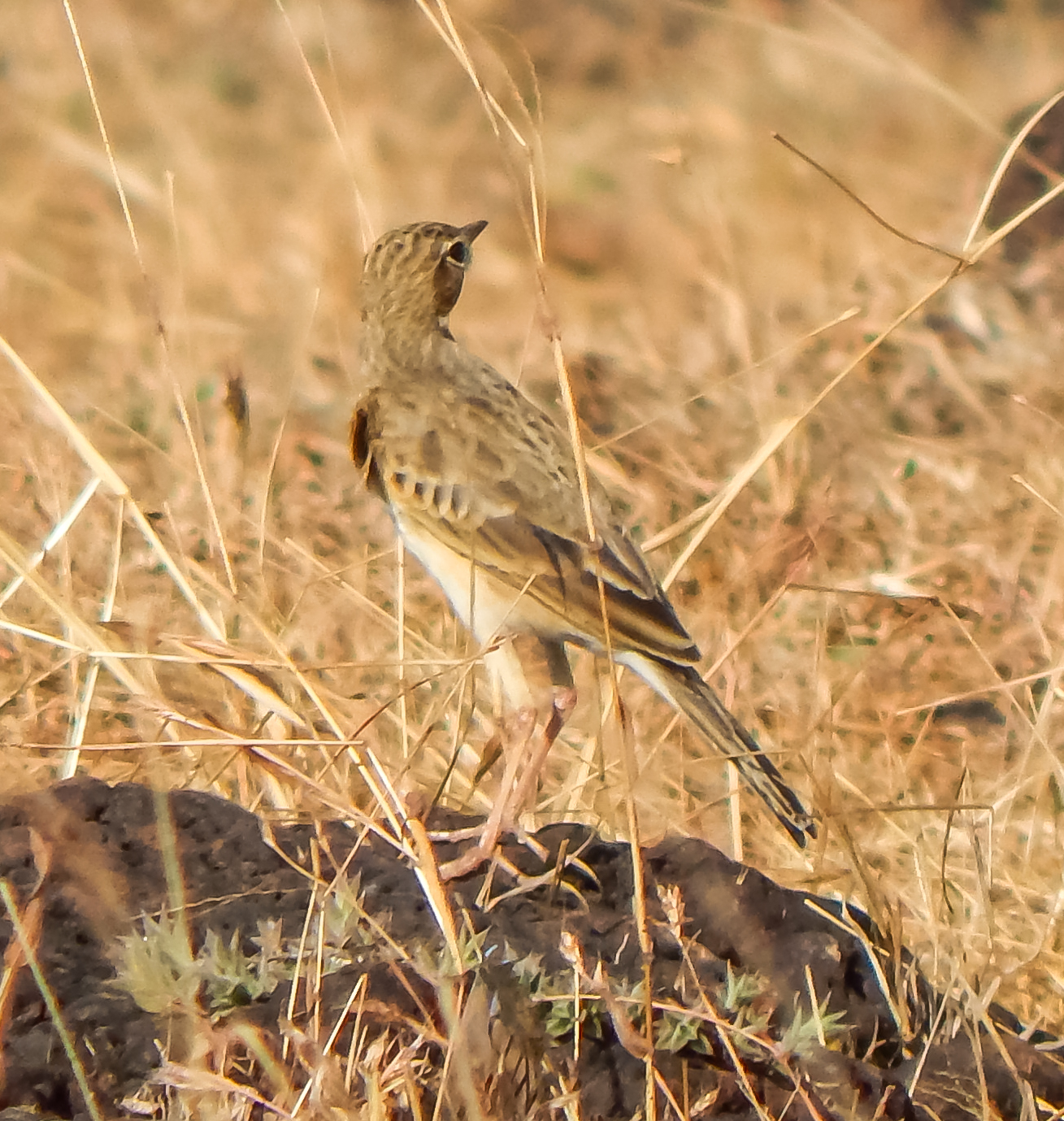
Richard's pipit – head turn

It is a bird of open country, particularly flat lowland areas. It inhabits grassland, steppe and cultivated land, preferring more fertile, moist habitats. In Europe it is most often recorded on headlands and islands. It occurs alone or in small groups.

Like other pipits, this species is insectivorous. It mainly feeds on the ground and will also make short flights to catch flying insects. A few seeds are also eaten.

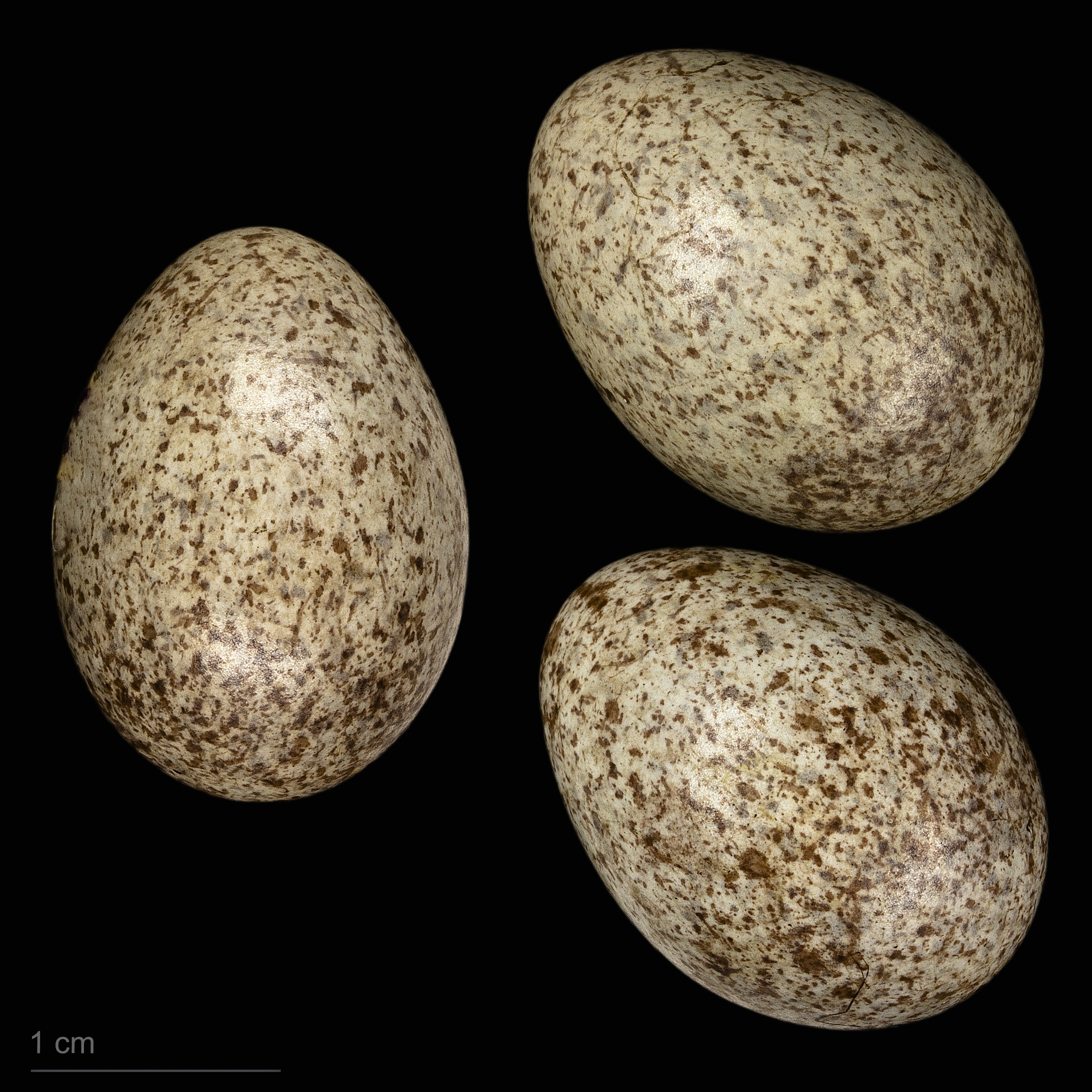
Anthus richardi - MHNT

The nest is made of grass or moss and is built on the ground under a grass tussock.
