= The Magpies =

Poem written by Denis Glover

"The Magpies" is the most famous poem by New Zealand poet Denis Glover (1912–1980). It helped define New Zealand's distinctive style of poetry. The poem was first published in the Caxton anthology Recent Poems in 1941, and again in Glover's 1964 anthology Enter Without Knocking.

Over the course of six short stanzas, the life of a farming couple from young man and wife through to their death of old age is recounted, each verse finishing with the couplet:

And Quardle oodle ardle wardle doodle/The magpies said,

except for the last verse, in which the last word is "say".

The intention of the poem is to indicate the passage of time and yet the timelessness of nature. A human lifetime passes, yet the underlying natural life - symbolised by the unchanging backdrop of the magpies' call - remains unchanging.

The phrase imitating the call of the Australian magpie is one of the most well-known lines in New Zealand poetry. Bill Manhire has commented that this line is "determinedly unpoetic".

== See also ==
- Australian magpies in New Zealand

== Bibliography ==
- Wedde, I., and McQueen, H. (eds.) (1985). The Penguin Book Of New Zealand Verse. Auckland: Penguin Books (N.Z.).
- Stafford, Jane; Williams, Mark, eds. (2012). Anthology of New Zealand literature. Auckland, NZ: Auckland University Press. ISBN 9781869405892.
