= Australian magpie in New Zealand =

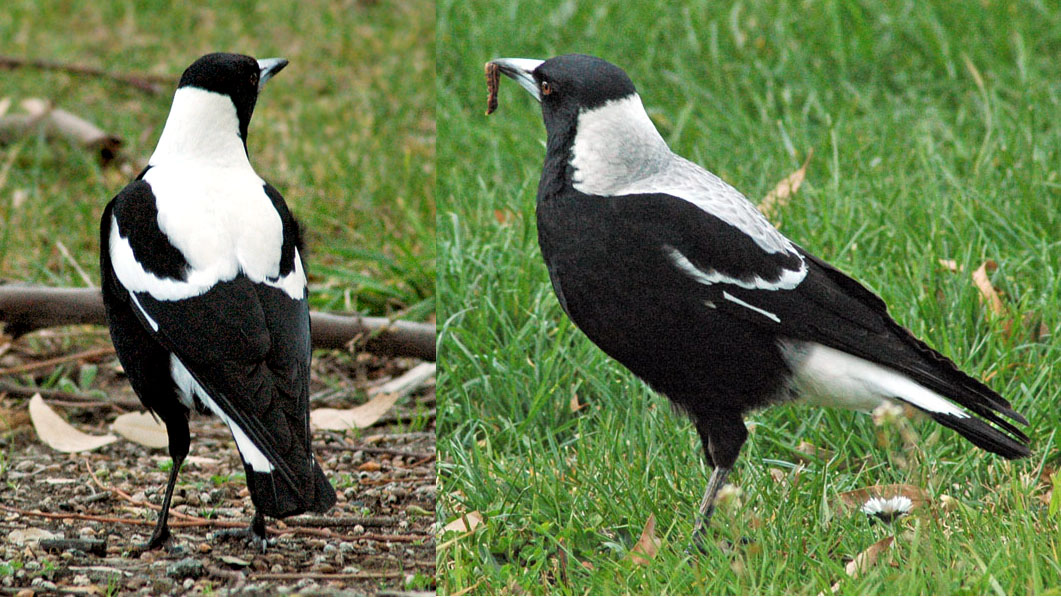
Male (left) and female (right) magpies of Tasmania

The Australian magpie (Gymnorhina tibicen) is a medium-sized black and white passerine bird native to Australia and southern New Guinea. Three subspecies, including both black-backed and white-backed magpies, were introduced to New Zealand from the 1860s to control pests in pastures. They are now spread through much of the two main islands of the country.

== Introductions and distribution ==
Magpies taken mainly from Tasmania and Victoria in Australia were introduced to New Zealand by local acclimatisation societies of Otago and Canterbury in the 1860s, with the Wellington Acclimatisation Society releasing 260 birds in 1874. They were introduced to control agricultural pests, and were a protected species until 1951.

It seems that three of the nine subspecies were introduced – the large white-backed G. t. tyrannica of southeastern Australia, the smaller white-backed G. t. hypoleuca of Tasmania and the black-backed G. t. tibicen of northern Australia. Magpies are now common in pasturelands, forest patches and suburban areas throughout the North Island and some of its offshore islands, in the eastern South Island from Blenheim to Southland, and increasingly in Tasman Bay and on the West Coast from Westport to Franz Josef / Waiau. The white-backed forms predominate, except in Hawke's Bay and North Canterbury, where 95% are black-backed. Magpies are not present in forested areas of Fiordland or in alpine areas above the tree line. They are still scarce in South Westland and Stewart Island, and in Golden Bay / Mohua, where Tasman District Council aims to keep them out.

== Behaviour ==
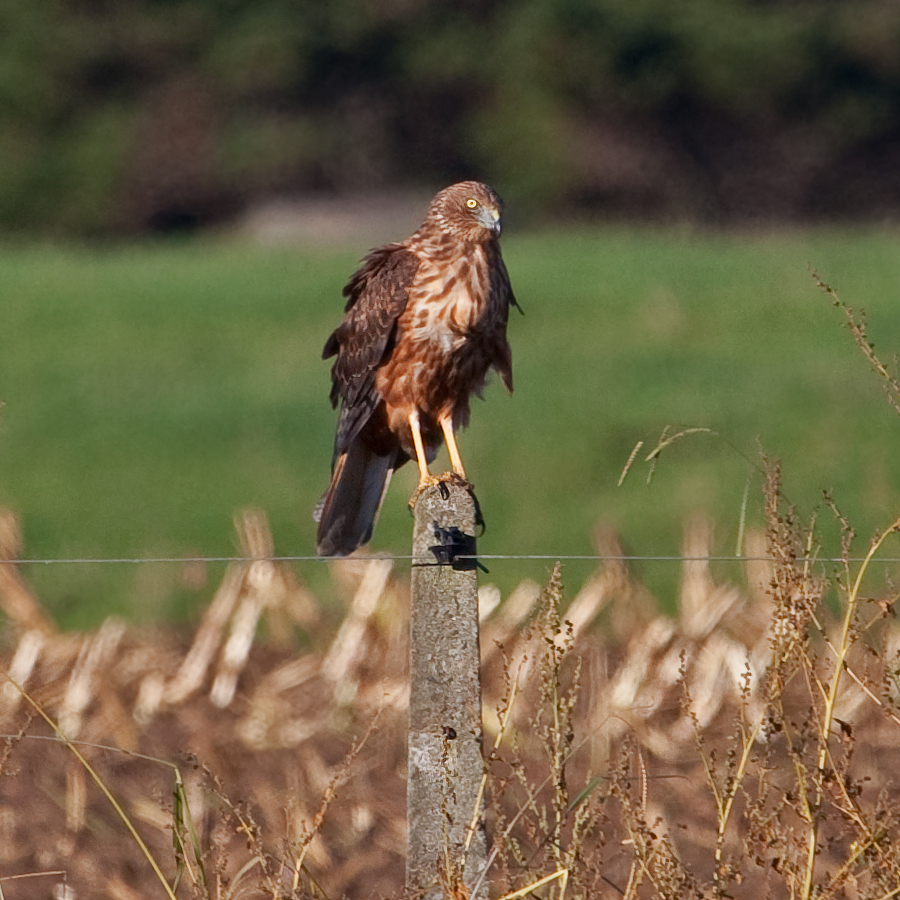
Magpies harass or attack swamp harriers (pictured) far more than they do to any other bird species in New Zealand.

The birds can be agonistic. During the breeding season, while nestlings are defenceless for the first 2–3 weeks, the fathers will be very protective and swoop anything they perceive as a threat to their young. This can often be avoided by acknowledging their presence or if possible befriending them with regular reassuring interaction to let them know you are not a threat. These birds are very intelligent and have facial recognition as well as the ability to communicate to each other both spatially and inter-generationally. So if they recognise someone because of a previous negative interaction they will also perceive them as a threat to their defenceless offspring and to the continuation of the species.

Documented academic studies have provided little, if any, evidence that the Australian magpie is a predator of native species in New Zealand. Anecdotal evidence is flawed, being highly subjective, frequently uninformed and therefore largely erroneous. Many interactions between magpies and other species can be explained by the viewer's misinterpretation of avian behaviours, incorrect readings of predetermining, contributing factors or a general lack of knowledge of basic avian biology. Scientific peer-reviewed academic research carried out over decades seldom, if at all, justifies the Australian magpie's status as a pest species in New Zealand, let alone a predator. They have been accused of affecting native bird populations such as the tūī and kererū, or sometimes raiding nests for eggs and nestlings. However, studies by Waikato University have cast doubt on these common yet unsubstantiated beliefs. The same authors suggest that birds avoid areas close to magpies as they are sometimes attacked by breeding adults, but actual attacks are infrequent. The authors suggest that magpies may have a positive effect on the abundance of other birds, as they chase off proven predators such as swamp harriers.

== Control as pests ==
Australian magpies are not classified as a pest organism at a national level (NZ Biosecurity – direct communication via email). Any pest classification and subsequent management is done under regional pest management plans developed by regional authorities. The Biosecurity Act 1993 grants powers to territorial authorities to carry out pest control. Under the Act, any species specified as a pest under a pest management plan cannot be sold, propagated, bred, released, or commercially displayed.

Nine regional councils funded a study by Landcare Research and Waikato University that concluded that the harmful effects that magpies have on indigenous and other bird life is not so great as to make them such a serious pest that councils should attempt expensive large-scale control – therefore any control measures would be for other reasons (e.g. conflict with humans).

In the Wellington Region magpies are classed as a site-led pest animal in the regional pest management plan, and are controlled when they are threatening injury to humans by swooping and attacking, and to reduce effects on the natural environment.

== Cultural references ==
The comic Footrot Flats features a magpie character by the name of Pew. It is portrayed as dysfunctional after being hand reared and often seeking revenge after the tree in which it had nested was cut down.

The Magpies was a popular poem written in 1964 by poet Denis Glover. In the poem each verse except for the last one ended with the couplet:

And Quardle oodle ardle wardle doodle/The magpies said,

This imitation of the distinctive call of the magpie is one of the most recognised lines in New Zealand poetry.

The Hawke's Bay Rugby Union team that participates in the National Provincial Championship is nicknamed the Magpies.

== See also ==
- Invasive species in New Zealand
