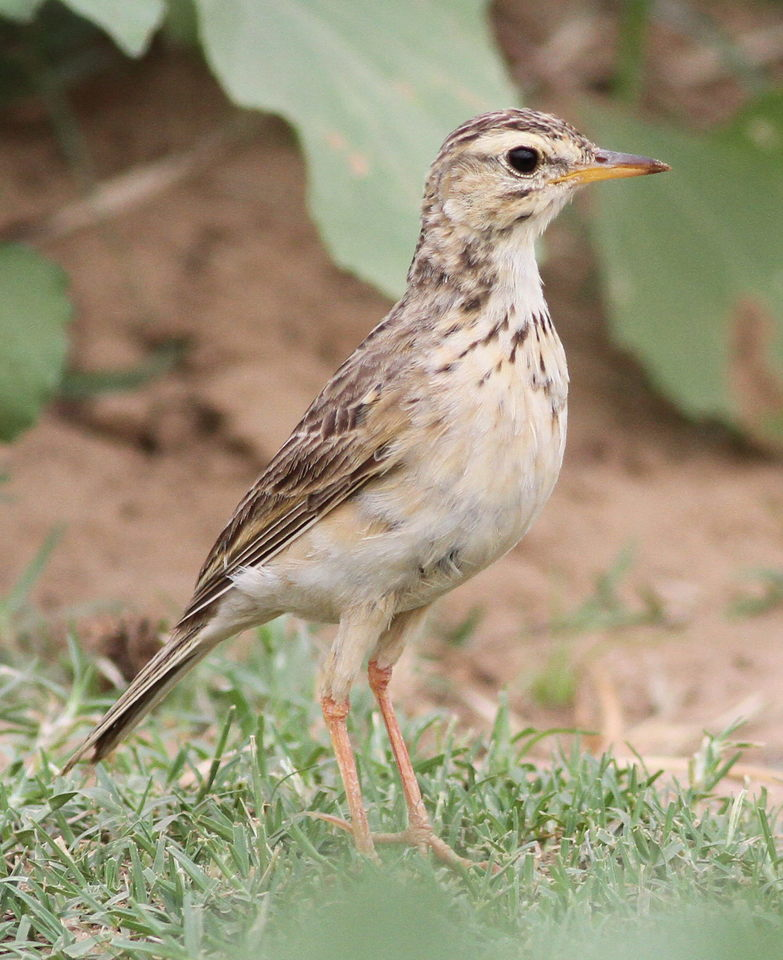

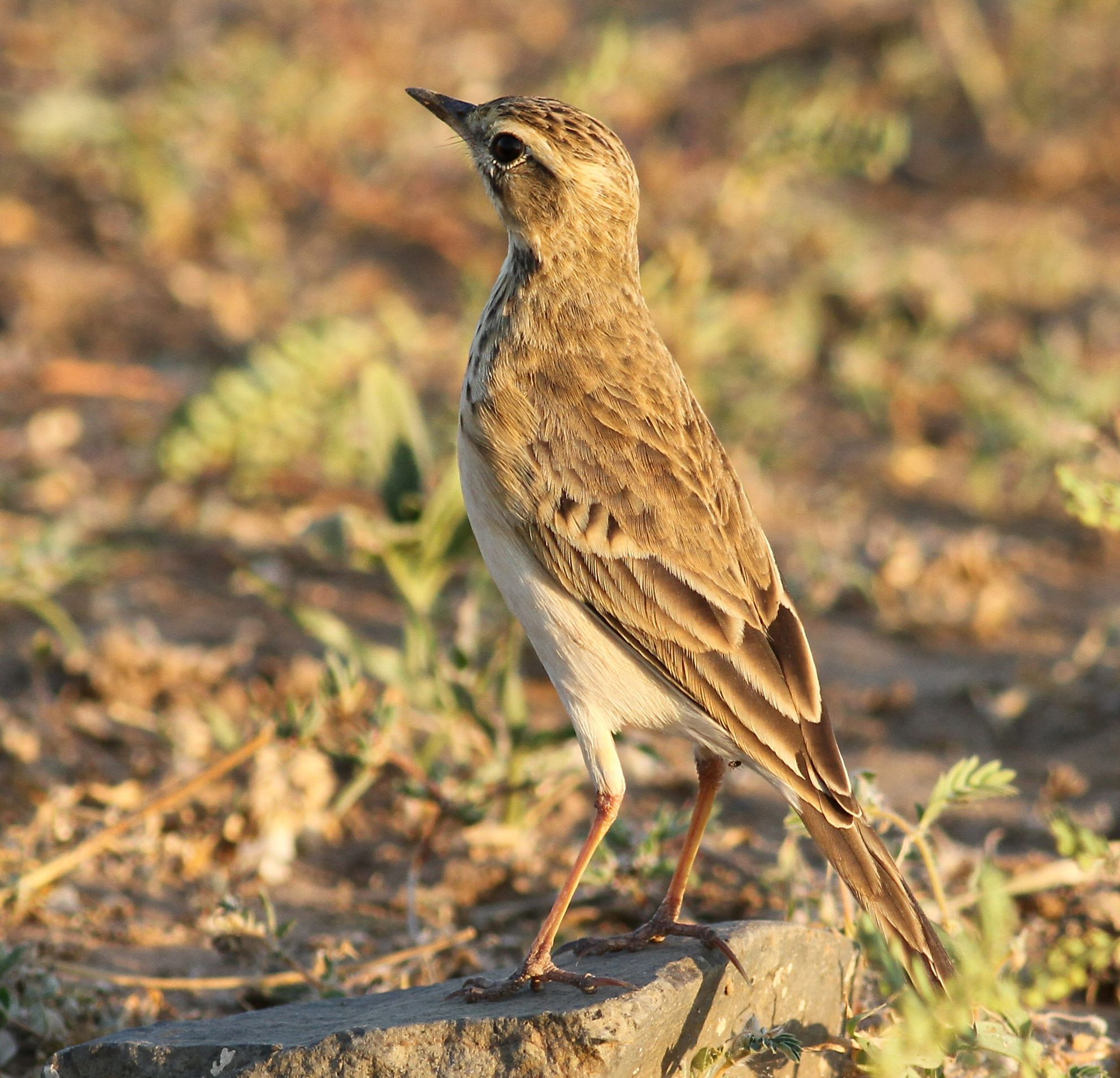
- A. c. rufuloides (above) and A. c. bocagii (below, dorsal view) in South Africa

Conservation status
- Least Concern (IUCN 3.1)

Scientific classification
- Kingdom: Animalia
- Phylum: Chordata
- Class: Aves
- Order: Passeriformes
- Family: Motacillidae
- Genus: Anthus
- Species: A. cinnamomeus

Binomial name
- Anthus cinnamomeus Rüppell, 1840

= African pipit =

Species of bird

The African pipit (Anthus cinnamomeus) is a fairly small passerine bird belonging to the pipit genus Anthus in the family Motacillidae. It is also known as the grassveld pipit or grassland pipit. It was formerly lumped together with the Richard's, Australian, mountain and paddyfield pipits in a single species, Richard's pipit (Anthus novaeseelandiae), but is now often treated as a species in its own right.

It has some defining characteristics, such as light brown feathers on the head and back, dark brown feathers on the lower back and tail, and a white chest.

== Subspecies ==
Some 15 subspecies are recognized:

- A. (c.) camaroonensis Shelley, 1900 – highlands of western Cameroon
- A. c. lynesi Bannerman & Bates, 1926 – southeastern Nigeria to southwestern Sudan
- A. c. stabilis Clancey, 1986 – locally in Sudan and South Sudan
- A. c. cinnamomeus Rüppell, 1840 – locally in Ethiopian highlands
- A. c. eximius Clancey, 1986 – southern Arabian peninsula
- A. c. annae R.Meinertzhagen, 1921 – coastal Horn of Africa to coastal Tanzania
- A. c. itombwensis Prigogine, 1981 – eastern highlands of the DRC
- A. c. lacuum R.Meinertzhagen, 1920 – perimeter of Lake Victoria to central Tanzania
- A. c. latistriatus F.J.Jackson, 1899 – seasonal vagrant from its Itombwe Mountains breeding range
- A. c. winterbottomi Clancey, 1985 – highlands of Malawi and adjacent countries
- A. c. lichenya Vincent, 1933 – plateaus of tropical and southcentral Africa, incl. Zimbabwean plateau
- A. c. spurium Clancey, 1951 – lowlands of southcentral Africa to coastal lowlands of Mozambique
- A. c. bocagii Nicholson, 1884 – drier regions of southcentral Africa, reaching northern South Africa
- A. c. grotei Niethammer, 1957 – higher rainfall regions of Namibia and Botswana
- A. c. rufuloides Roberts, 1936 – plateaus and lowlands of South Africa, Eswatini and Lesotho

== Distribution and habitat ==
It occurs in grassland and fields in Southern, Central and East Africa, south-east of a line from Angola through the DRCongo to Sudan. It is also found in south-western Arabia. There is an isolated population in the highlands of Cameroon which is sometimes considered to be a separate species: Cameroon pipit (Anthus camaroonensis).

== Description ==
The African pipit is 15 to 17 cm (5.9 to 6.7 in) long and is a slender bird with an erect stance. It is buffy-brown above with darker streaks. The underparts are white or pale buff with a streaked breast and plain belly and flanks. The face is boldly patterned with a pale stripe over the eye and a dark malar stripe. The outer tail-feathers are white. The legs are long and pinkish and the slender bill is dark with a yellowish base to the lower mandible. Juvenile birds have a blotched breast, scalloping on the upperparts and some streaking on the flanks.

The song is a repeated series of twittering notes, given during an undulating song-flight or from a low perch.

The Cameroon pipit is slightly larger and darker with buff underparts.

== Conservation status ==
Zimmerman, Turner, and Pearson (1999) call it "the common East African pipit", but BirdLife International has lumped the African pipit with Richard's pipit, and therefore has given it no separate conservation status.

== Gallery ==
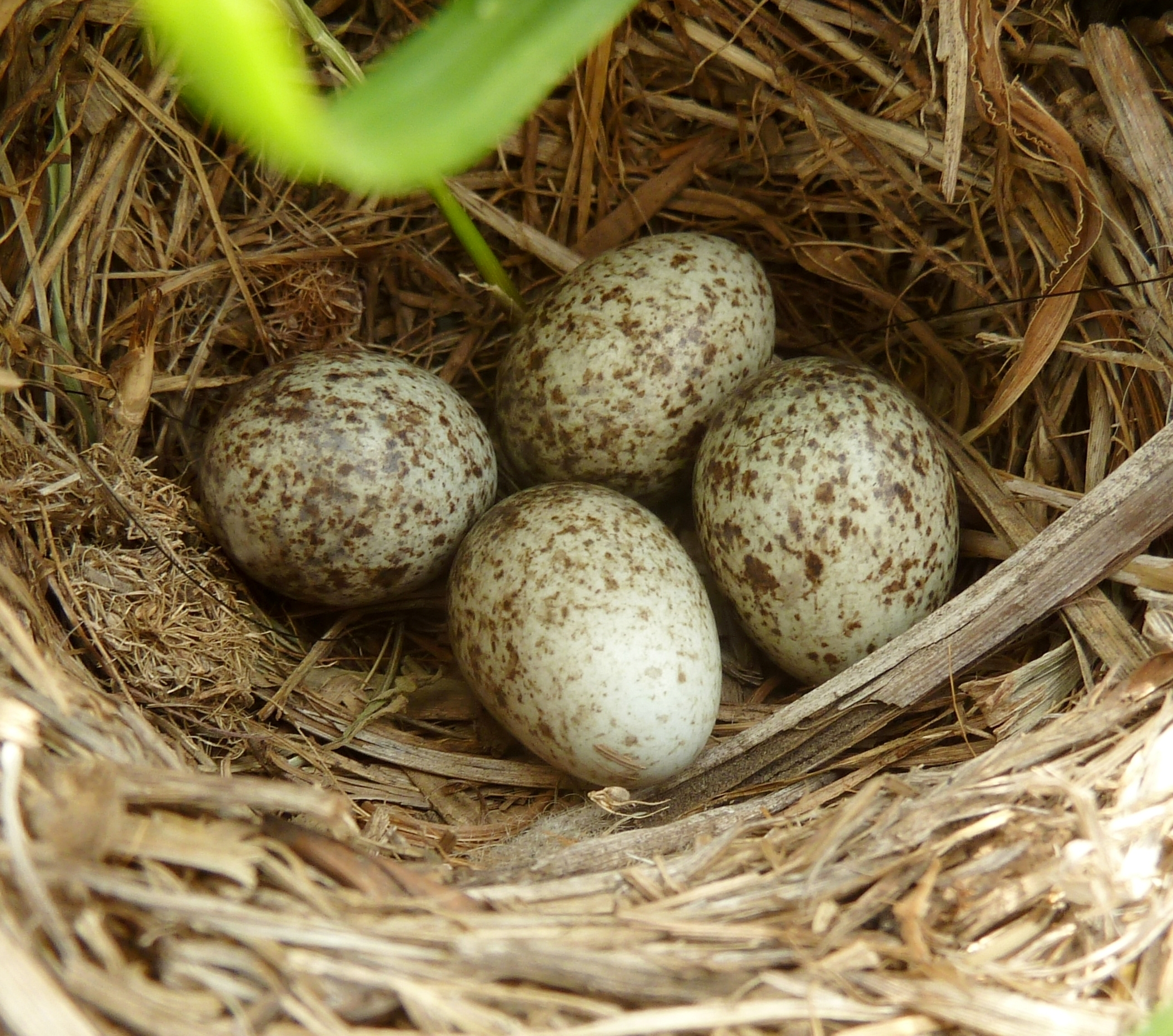
A nest of A. c. rufuloides in a grassy floodplain, South Africa]

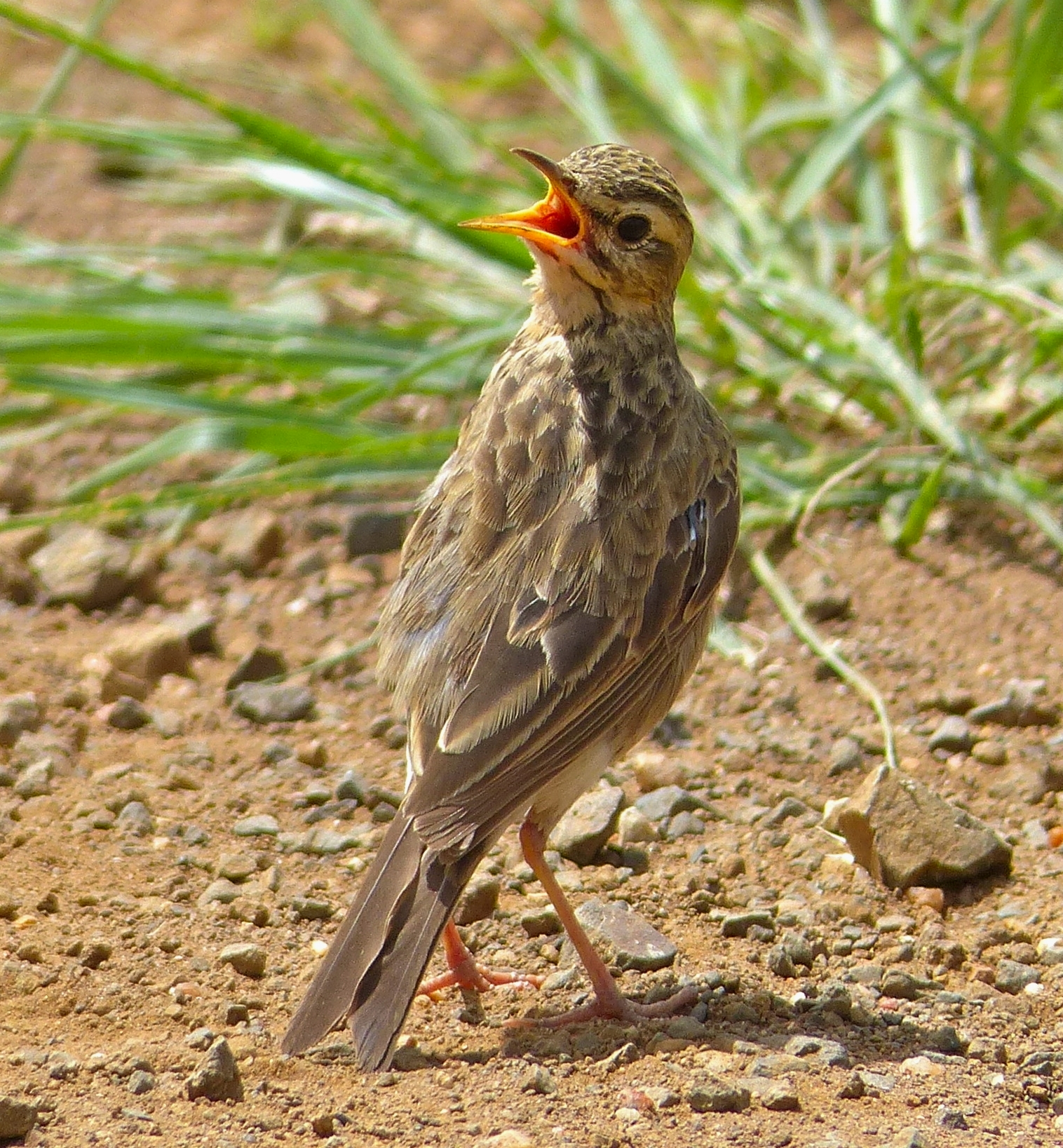
Juvenile A. c. rufuloides showing heavy mottling on the mantle plumage

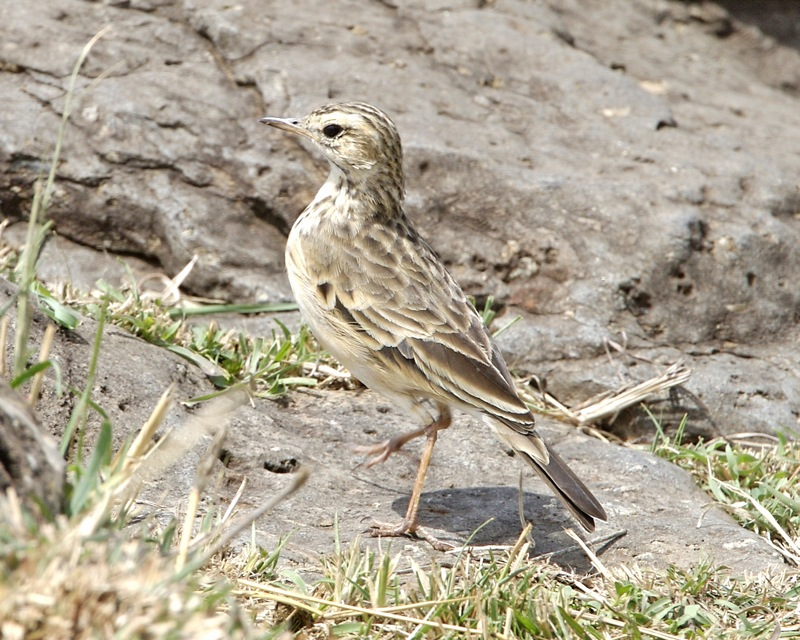
Adult A. c. lacuum in Kenya
