= Australasian pipit =

Australasian pipit has been split into two species:

- New Zealand pipit, Anthus novaeseelandiae
- Australian pipit, Anthus australis
