= Common brushtail possum in New Zealand =

Invasive pest in New Zealand

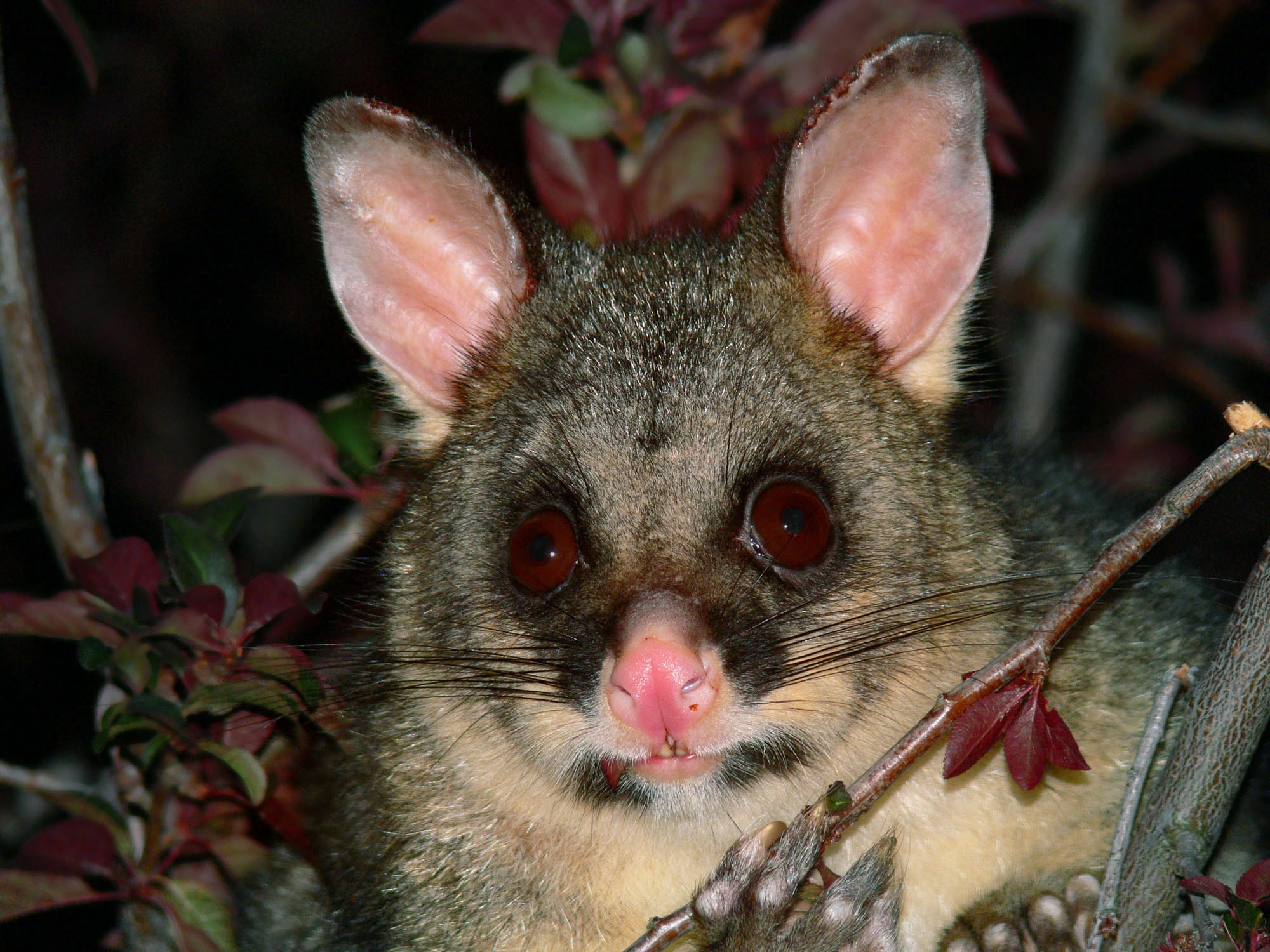
Common brushtail possum

The common brushtail possum (Trichosurus vulpecula) was introduced from Australia to New Zealand, where it has become invasive and a major agricultural and conservation pest. In Māori it is called paihamu, a transliteration of "possum".

== Introduction by European settlers ==
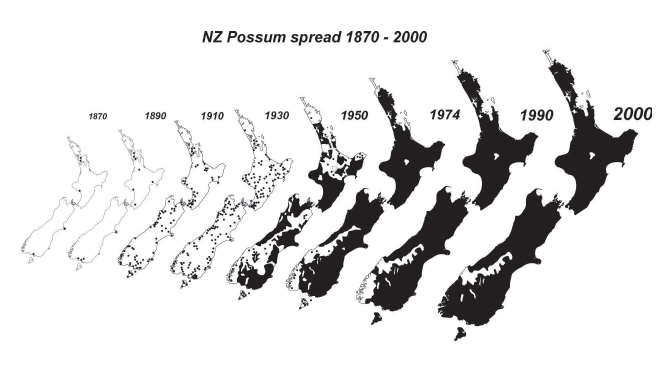

European settlers aiming to establish a wild source for food and fibre and fur pelts for clothing introduced the common brushtail possum from Australia (from Victorian and Tasmanian populations) to New Zealand in the 1850s. Even as late as 1936 the government refused Taranaki Acclimatisation Society permission to introduce a new strain of possums and in 1937 the Waitaki Acclimatisation Society proposed a closed season to allow numbers to recover. The earliest introduction may have been at Riverton / Aparima in 1840. An article in Nature in 1870 warned of the dangers, as did farmers and fruit growers, but some academics supported introduction and the Department of Tourist and Health Resorts was still introducing possums at Rotorua in the 1910s. Introductions peaked in the 1920s.

By the 1980s the peak population had reached an estimated 60–70 million. Through control measures, by 2009 the New Zealand population had been reduced to an estimated 30 million.

== Impacts ==
=== Agriculture ===
Possums are vectors of bovine tuberculosis (Mycobacterium bovis), which is a major threat to the dairy, beef, and deer-farming industries. The disease is endemic in possums across about 38% of New Zealand, known as "vector risk areas", where nearly 70% of new herd infections can be traced back to possums or ferrets. The Biosecurity Act 1993, which established a national pest-management strategy, is the legislation behind control of the disease in New Zealand. The Animal Health Board operates a nationwide programme of cattle testing and possum control, with the goal of eradicating M. bovis from wild vector species across 2.5 million hectares – or one quarter – of New Zealand's at-risk areas by 2026, and eventually, eradicating the disease entirely.

The bovine TB-free New Zealand programme is regarded as "world-leading". It has successfully reduced cattle and deer herd infection rates from more than 1700 in 1994 to fewer than 100 herds in July 2011. Much of this success can be attributed to sustained possum control reducing cross-infection and breaking the disease cycle. For example, at Hohotaka, in New Zealand's central North Island, control work from 1988 to 1994 achieved a sustained mean reduction of 87.5% in the density of TB‐infected possums. As expected, annual TB incidence in local cattle herds consequently declined by a similar amount (83.4%).

Possums are controlled through a combination of trapping, ground-baiting (laying poisoned baits by hand), and where other methods are impractical, aerial treatment with sodium fluoroacetate, a poison also known as 1080.

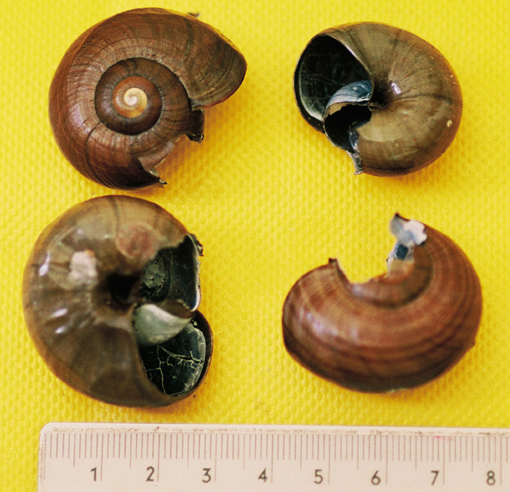
Shells of native snails eaten by possums

From 1979 to 1984, possum control was stopped due to lack of funding. In spite of regular and frequent bovine TB testing of cattle herds, the number of infected herds snowballed and continued to increase until 1994. The area of New Zealand where TB-infected wild animals occurred expanded from about 10 to 40%.

That possums are such effective transmitters of bovine TB appears to be facilitated by their behaviour once they catch the disease. This behaviour has been captured on video.

=== Conservation ===
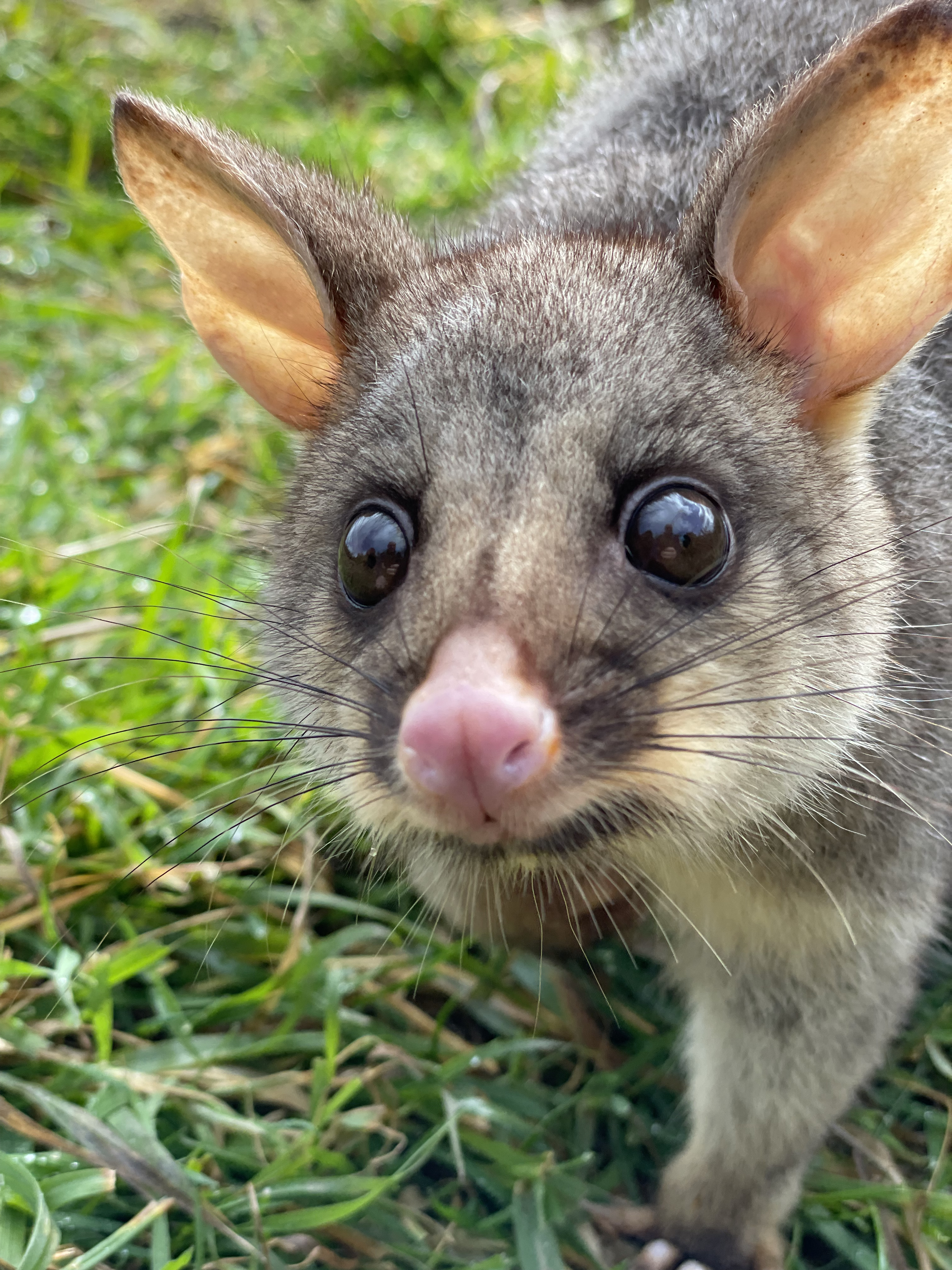
Brushtail possum in Waikato, New Zealand

The introduction of possums has been ecologically damaging because the native vegetation has evolved in the absence of mammalian omnivores. Possums selectively browse native vegetation, causing particular damage to broadleaved trees, notably Metrosideros species, including rātā. This leads to competition for food with native forest birds, changes in forest composition, and eventually canopy collapse. Possums are opportunists and eat the eggs of native birds. They do not have so much impact on southern beech (Nothofagus), but their presence tends to reduce the species diversity of Nothofagus forests, since they consume many of the other species that would naturally be present. The predation of bird eggs and chicks has led them to be referred to as "reluctant folivores" in that they eat foliage to survive, but prefer other foods.

== Control ==
Attempts to reduce numbers by trapping and poisoning have had some success. Trapping and cyanide are generally used by individual hunters as pest control or fur harvesting, while the Department of Conservation (DoC), Animal Health Board (AHB), and regional councils use 1080 to target larger areas. Studies by DoC have found that the risk of the few losses of native birds (34 individuals in 70 aerial drop operations) and native invertebrates and mammals are outweighed by the recovery of the native species once the competition for food and predation has been eased. There is the added benefit of killing other invasive species. Isolated reports of pets, in particular dogs, succumbing to poisoning from 1080 have been given, probably through eating possum carcasses. The AHB and the DoC jointly operate poison drops. The effects of these drops on the environment have been considered by ERMA in allowing the use of 1080. and in consultation with Māori. There is opposition to the use of 1080 from some quarters. New Zealand is the world's largest user of 1080.

To prevent damage to young trees, keeping numbers very low seems necessary, perhaps 5% of the levels that would be reached without interference. DoC is the largest single agency involved in possum control, but much of which is also carried by the AHB, councils and regional authorities, especially to combat the threat of bovine tuberculosis.

In 2009, conservation measures had achieved some significant success, especially in certain regions, and had reduced possum numbers to around 30 million animals from a carrying capacity of 48 million. (Estimates produced in the 1980s of 70 million possums were flawed.) Almost half (13.3 million hectares) of New Zealand's vegetated land is under some form of possum control, either for conservation reasons, or to reduce the spread of bovine tuberculosis.

== Economic uses ==
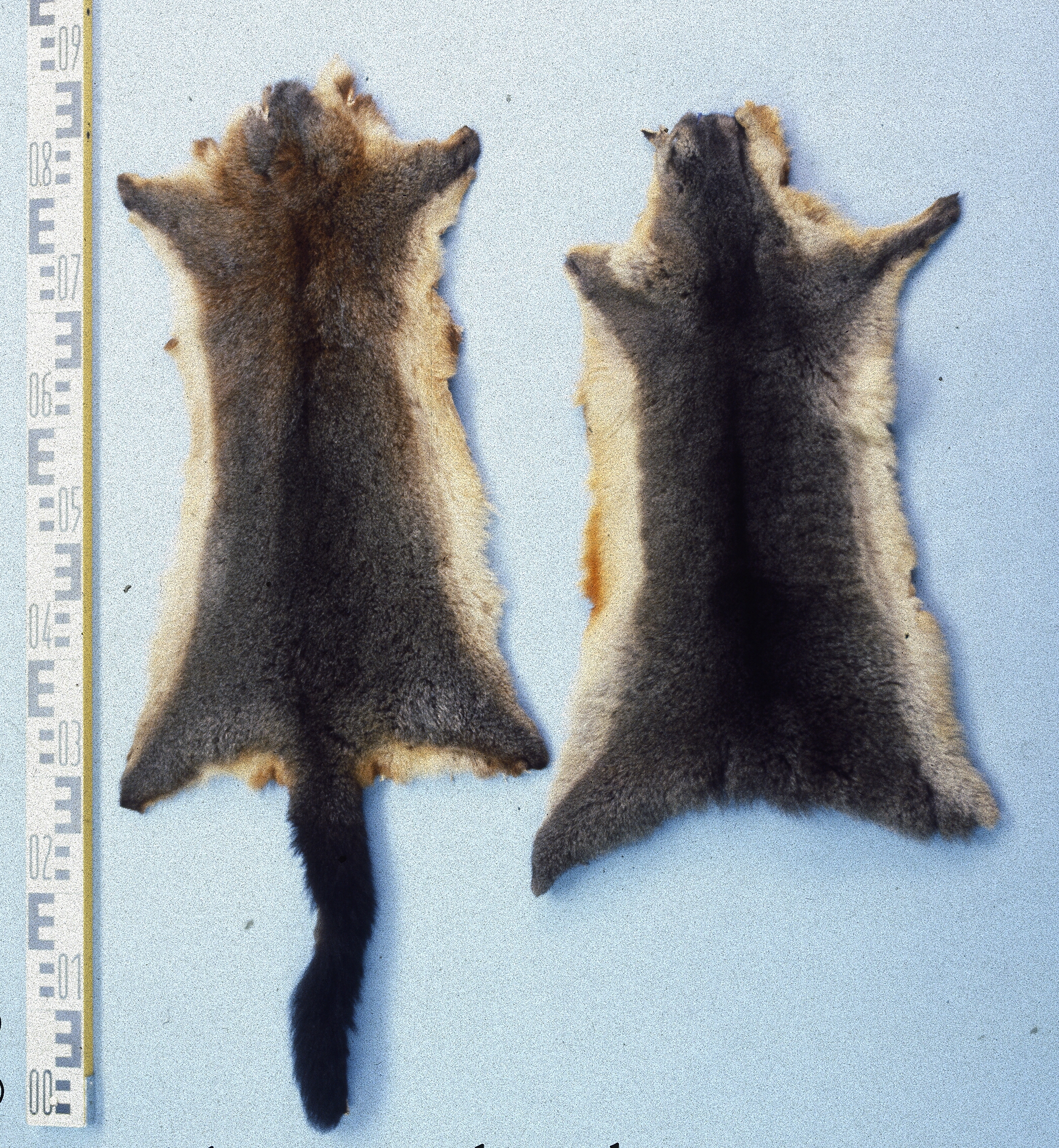
Possum pelts

An industry using fur pelts and wool mixed with possum fur fibre has developed, with trappers and hunters providing raw material. The fur is often sold as "eco-fur" by a number of manufacturing and retailing businesses. Possum hairs are hollow, like polar bear hairs, and the wool produced is both soft, and an excellent insulator. The number of animals taken for fur is rising and has almost equalled the numbers killed in poisoning. Several New Zealand companies are exporting possum carcasses to Taiwan, Hong Kong, and Malaysia for human consumption, where possum is regarded as a delicacy and known as "Kiwi bear". There is also a small industry processing possum meat as 'Possyum' dog food, also for export.

=== Sport ===
In 2010, the Royal New Zealand Society for the Prevention of Cruelty to Animals criticised a number of New Zealand schools that had carried out "possum-tossing contests", which involved throwing dead possums. The society said, "while it's technically not illegal, it's morally wrong to throw a dead animal around". The principal of one of the schools said that the contest helped pupils to engage with the outdoors and had also included education about humane methods of possum control. A local newspaper editorial argued that the schools were in rural areas, which had different practices, "both traditional and otherwise", to those of urban areas.

== See also ==
- 1080 usage in New Zealand
- Conservation in New Zealand
- Agriculture in New Zealand
- Daughterless Carp Project
