= 1080 usage in New Zealand =

Pest control in New Zealand

1080, the brand name given to the synthetic form of sodium fluoroacetate, is used in New Zealand in efforts to control populations of possums, rats, stoat and rabbits, which are invasive species in the New Zealand environment. Although the Parliamentary Commissioner for the Environment deemed the use of 1080 in New Zealand "effective and safe" in a 2011 re-evaluation and the substance is widely considered to be the most effective tool currently available for controlling possums over large areas, it remains a contentious issue, with the majority of the debate occurring between conservationists and livestock farmers on one side and hunters and animal-rights activists on the other.

New Zealand is the largest user of 1080 poison, using about 80% of the world's supply. Biodegradable 1080 poison is the only poison currently registered for use on mainland New Zealand as suitable for aerial targeting of the common brushtail possum; a major conservation and agricultural pest. New Zealand has used 1080 for pest control since the late 1950s; it imports sodium fluoroacetate in raw form from the United States of America.

== Background ==
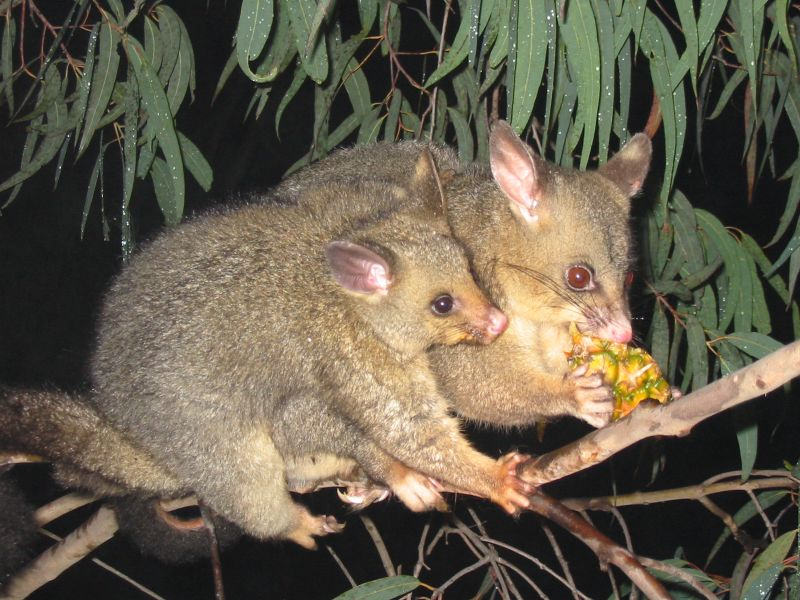
Common brushtail possums, an invasive pest in New Zealand whose population is controlled with 1080

New Zealand is unusual in that it has no naturally occurring extant terrestrial mammal, except for two species of bat. Similarly, no confirmed fossils of terrestrial mammals have been found in New Zealand from the 85 million years since the landmass split away from Gondwana (except for the St Bathans mammal which is of unclear lineage). As such, New Zealand’s fauna and flora evolved in the absence of mammals and generally didn’t develop the evolutionary strategies needed to avoid predation by mammals. When human activity accidentally or deliberately introduced numerous species of invasive mammalian predators to New Zealand (most notably including rats, brush-tailed possums, cats and mustelids) many of New Zealand’s native species were unable to respond and were preyed upon. Because of this, the introduction of mammalian predators is strongly linked to the decline of New Zealand’s fauna and flora, having a disastrous effect on the populations of many iconic species including kiwi, tuatara and giant wētā. Because of the continuing impacts of mammalian predators in New Zealand, there is a strong need to utilise a range of specialised predator control tactics to protect New Zealand’s species, including the usage of 1080.

== Usage ==
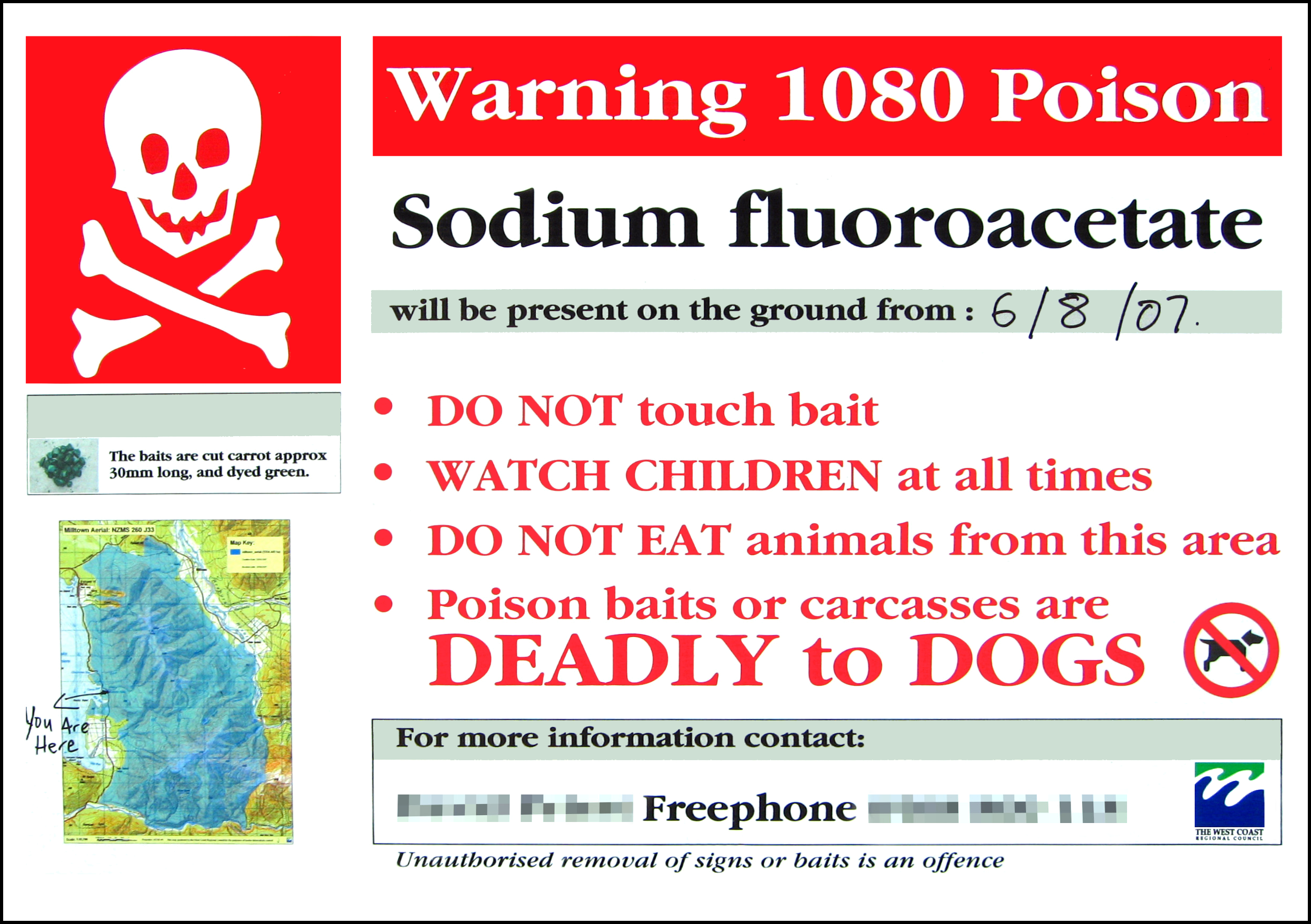
Warning sign for 1080 bait on the West Coast

The largest users of 1080 in New Zealand are the Animal Health Board and the Department of Conservation (DOC). It is also used on a smaller scale for pest control by Regional Councils and private landowners. The first trials were carried out in New Zealand in 1954, and by 1957 its use had become widespread. 1080 baits are used through ground-based and aerial application. 1080 is considered to be suitable for use as a mammalian pest control in New Zealand because the country has only two native land mammals (bats). 1080 is commonly used in Western Australia to kill feral carnivores, as the compound is naturally occurring in Western Australian flora and the native herbivores and their native predators are immune.

=== Controlling conservation pests ===
When correctly applied, 1080 is very effective at controlling conservation pests. One aerial application can kill 98% of possums and more than 90% of rats in the targeted area. These successful knock-down rates provide vulnerable native birds with a crucial breeding window to raise chicks through to fledging, increasing their survival rate. The DOC uses aerially applied 1080 poison across about 440,000 ha of conservation land each year. This equates to 5% of the total conservation estate.

DOC's pest control programme is governed by residual trap catch rates, the percentage of nights in which a trap catches a pest. Targets are usually set to less than 5%, though rates below 2% can be achieved by 1080.

=== Controlling agricultural pests ===
In New Zealand, the common brushtail possum was the main vector for the spread of bovine tuberculosis—a highly contagious disease affecting farmed cattle and deer. The disease was endemic in possums across about 38% of New Zealand (known as 'vector risk areas') but industry sources acknowledge the incidence of bovine TB fell to less than 0.05% in the areas where it is monitored. The organisation responsible for managing bovine TB in New Zealand, the Animal Health Board, uses 1080 poison as one of a range of pesticides to kill possums and control the spread of disease to both livestock and unaffected areas of the country. Aerial application of 1080 poison is only used in places where ground control methods are impractical or unable to reduce possum numbers to a low enough level to break the disease cycle. In 2011, this was less than 10% of the total area receiving possum control.

Both aerial and ground-based application of 1080 poison are also used to control rabbits, an introduced grazing pest. By 1960, it had become the main poison used in rabbit control. The combination of aerial spreading and the use of carrots poisoned with 1080 enabled rabbit boards (which were responsible for rabbit destruction work) to reduce rabbit numbers in most areas by the early 1960s.

== Debate ==
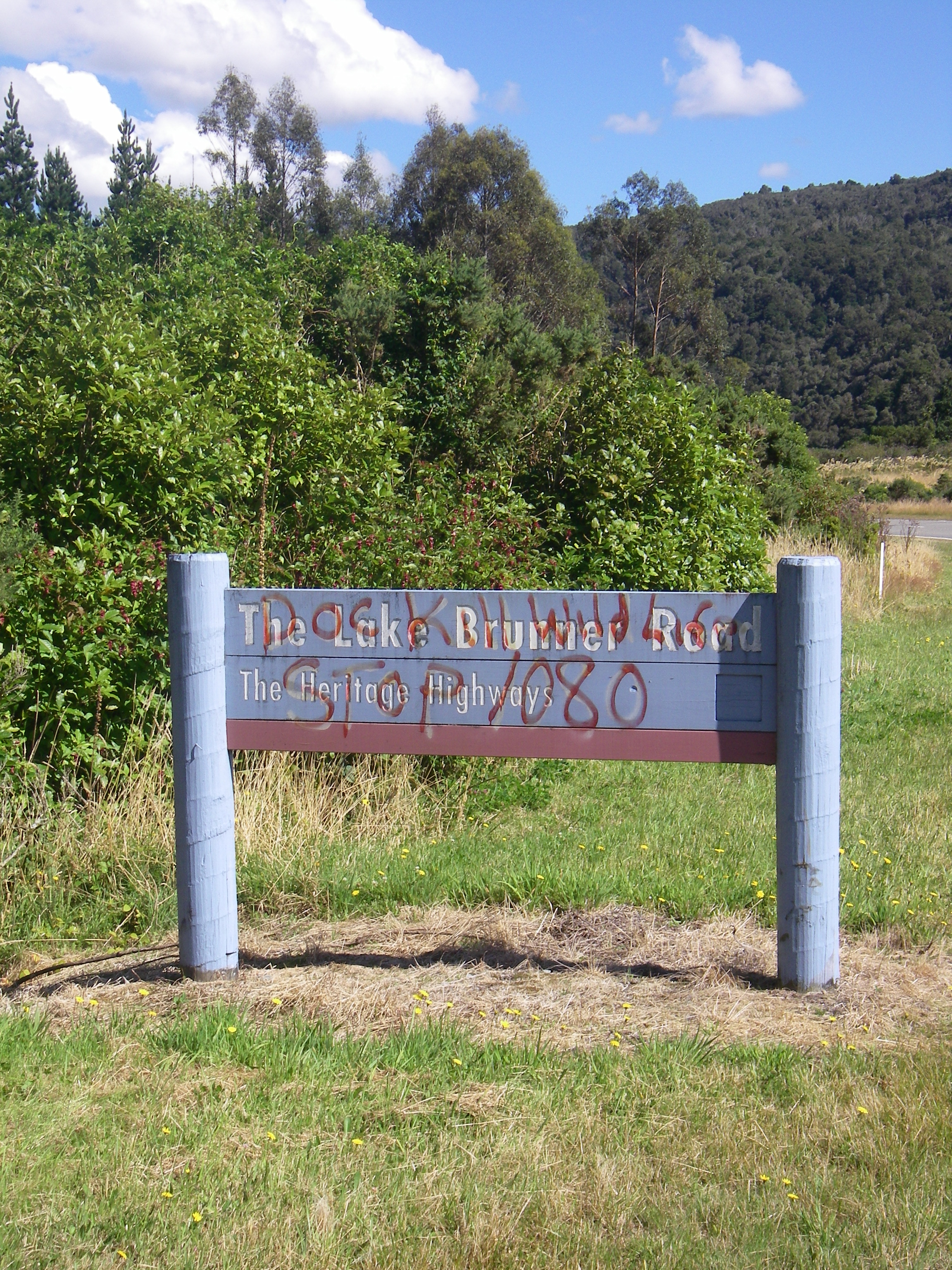
Road sign on the West Coast with graffiti opposing the use of 1080

The use of 1080 poison in New Zealand has been the subject of a long and complex debate. In general, the majority of conservationists and livestock farmers support the continued use of 1080 for pest control, while the hunting community, animal rights groups and antifluoride campaigners support a ban, although there are exceptions on both sides.

Organised opposition is usually small-scale and localised to areas where aerial 1080 operations are carried out. Protest is generally peaceful, but there have been occasions where opponents have resorted to violence or sabotage.

In August 2007, the Environmental Risk Management Authority released a review that gave new guidelines for the use of 1080 in New Zealand, and concluded the beneficial effects of pest eradication outweighed the risks. 1080 decomposes in natural water and soil into harmless compounds.

In June 2011, the Parliamentary Commissioner for the Environment (PCE) released a report in favour of 1080 to control possums, rats, and stoats, especially in large and remote areas. It is seen as an effective poison for aerial spreading. The PCE came to a number of conclusions, including not having a moratorium on 1080 use, and setting up a Game Animal Council.

In 2004, anti-1080 activist Phillip Anderton posed for the New Zealand media with a kiwi he claimed had been poisoned. An investigation revealed that Anderton lied to journalists and the public. He had used a kiwi that had been caught in a possum trap.

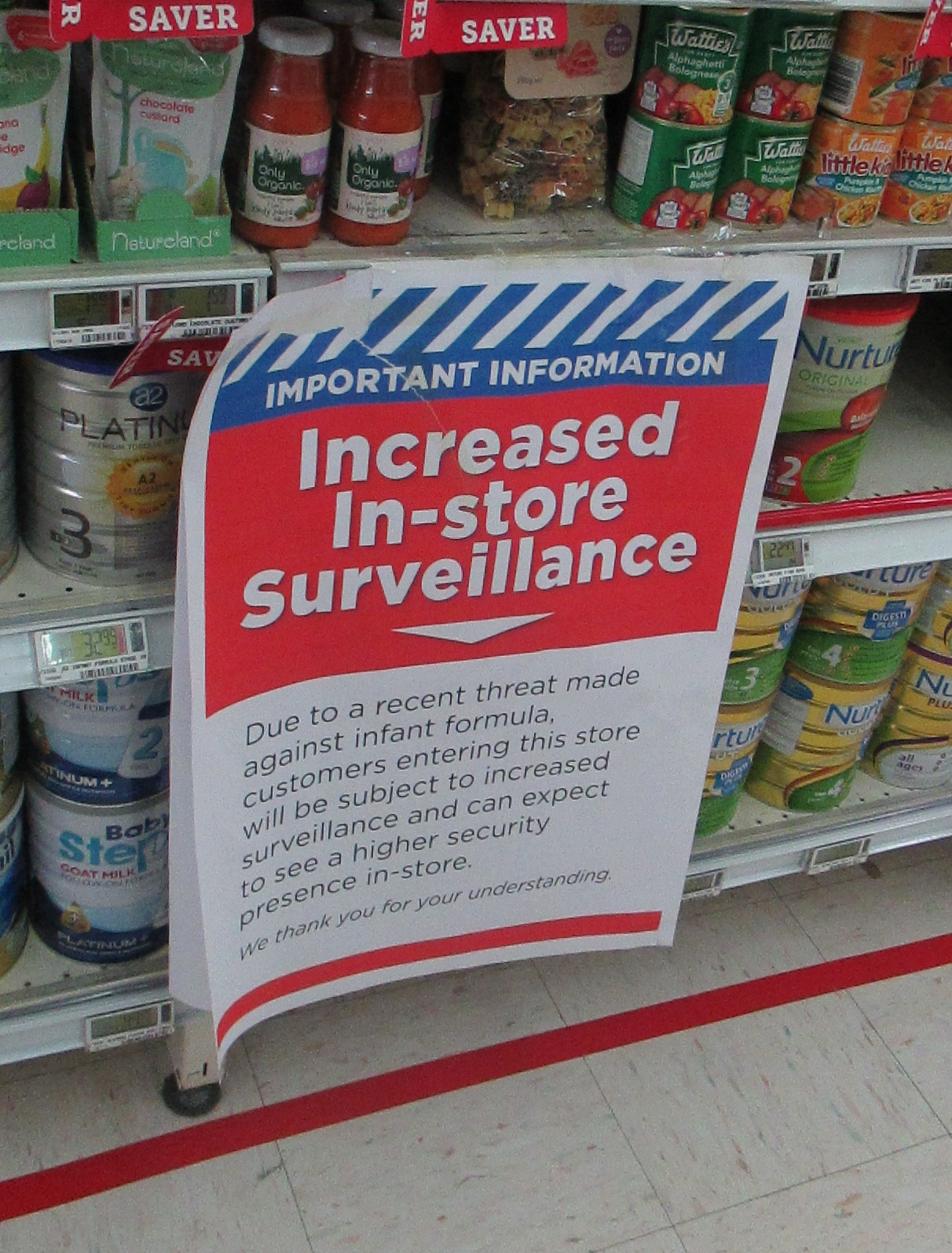
Sign at a supermarket after someone had threatened to poison infant milk with 1080

In 2015, the New Zealand Police revealed that anonymous blackmail threats were sent to Fonterra and Federated Farmers saying that infant formula in supermarkets would be poisoned unless the use of 1080 was halted by the end of the month. Fonterra responded by working with the Ministry for Primary Industries to develop two high-throughput, validated test methods and then testing every tanker of milk and every batch of infant formula for 1080. The ensuing police response Operation Concord led to charges laid against 60-year-old businessman Jeremy Hamish Kerr, who pleaded guilty to two charges of blackmail and was sentenced to 8 years 6 months imprisonment. Kerr had developed a rival brand of poison called Feratox and made the threats for financial gain. The court heard that Kerr received around $100,000 a year in royalties from Feratox, but sales were dwindling.

=== Support ===
The following agencies, organisations and political parties support the use of 1080 in New Zealand:

- The Animal Health Board, New Zealand's largest user of 1080 poison, strongly advocates for the continued use of 1080 to control the main TB vector — the common brushtail possum.
- The Department of Conservation, New Zealand's second-largest user of 1080 poison, strongly advocates for the continued use of 1080 poison to control ecological pests.
- Federated Farmers, New Zealand's biggest farmers' advocacy organisation, strongly supports the continued use of 1080 to control agricultural pests.
- Forest & Bird, New Zealand's biggest conservation charity, strongly advocates for the continued use of 1080 poison to control ecological pests.
- The Labour Party, one of New Zealand's two biggest parties, expressed strong support for the recommendations in the Parliamentary Commissioner for the Environment's report into 1080
- The National Party, one of New Zealand's two biggest parties, welcomed the report of the Parliamentary Commissioner for the Environment on the use of 1080 as the most effective tool available for pest management in New Zealand.
- ACT, New Zealand's classical liberal party, does not support a ban on the use of 1080.
- Local Government New Zealand, the organisation that represents the national interests of local councils, stated in a submission to the 2007 ERMA reassessment that "1080 is an important tool in New Zealand for pest animal control and TB control, as well as helping to maintain and protect our unique native flora and fauna."
- The Environmental Risk Management Authority concluded, in its 2007 reassessment of 1080, that the benefits of using it clearly outweighed the risks.
- The Parliamentary Commissioner for the Environment (Te Kaitiaki Taiao a Te Whare Pāremata), whose role it is to review and provide advice on environmental issues and the system of agencies and processes established by the government to manage the environment, concluded in their 2011 report on the poison that if we want to keep our forests for future generations we simply cannot afford to stop using 1080.
- The New Zealand Veterinary Association recognises that, in the absence of effective alternatives, the continued use of 1080 as a means of pest control (possums and some other introduced species) is necessary to assist the eradication of bovine tuberculosis and the conservation of New Zealand's unique native flora and fauna.

=== Opposition ===
These organisations and political parties have opposed the use of 1080 in New Zealand:

- The Royal New Zealand SPCA has called for a move away from 1080, stating that its use: "inflicts terrible, prolonged suffering on the animals that it poisons" but it recognises there is currently no alternative: "SPCA would like to see New Zealand move away from a reliance on poisons, including 1080, with the ultimate goal of being able to stop their use. We are realistic and pragmatic and we understand humane alternative solutions take time to develop and implement."
- The New Zealand Deerstalkers Association, which promotes the interests of hunters in New Zealand, have reiterated their national policy of opposing 1080 poisoning in the face of the Parliamentary Commission report advocating its increased use.
- The United Future political party, dissolved in 2017, supported fur recovery and trapping methods over aerial 1080, and labelled the Parliamentary Commissioner for the Environment's report on 1080 a "kick in the guts for many of our provincial communities".
- The Kiwi Party, dissolved in 2011, said, "the government-funded science for 1080 was not credible as government owned the 1080 factory and government-funded agencies spread the poison."
- SAFE, an animal rights group, considers the use of 1080 poisoning an extremely cruel practice.
- Ban 1080 Party, a single-issue party dissolved in 2018, was founded by Bill Wallace and opposed the use of 1080 poison. The party's co-leaders were Bill Wallace and Mike Downard.

=== Neutral stance ===
These organisations and political parties have a neutral stance on the use of 1080 poison in New Zealand:

- The Māori Party welcomed the Parliamentary Commissioner for the Environment's 2011 report on 1080. As a result of the report, it has dropped its call to ban 1080. In the run up to the 2011 general election, its party line was that "(1080 is) all we have at the moment and it's really good for the things like the rats and the stoats" but says more research is needed.

== Alternatives ==
Biodegradable 1080 poison is the only pesticide currently registered for use on mainland New Zealand as suitable for aerial targeting of possums. While many research teams are actively seeking new and supplemental approaches to current technologies, no method has yet gained widespread acceptance as a viable alternative to 1080.

=== Research ===
New Zealand currently spends at least $8 million annually on improving existing pest control technology and developing new methods.

According to the EPA's Annual Report on the Aerial Use of 1080, as of October 2011 there are currently over 50 research projects underway industry-wide to find improvements in the use of 1080, alternatives to 1080 and other related topics.

=== Comparing pest control methods ===
In the Parliamentary Commissioner for the Environment's June 2011 re-evaluation of 1080, these questions were used for assessing the effectiveness and safety of 1080, as well as current and prospective alternatives

1. Can the method decrease populations of possums, rats and stoats?
2. Can the method increase populations of native species?
3. Can the method rapidly knock down erupting populations of pests?
4. Can the method be used on a large scale in remote areas?
5. Is the method sufficiently cost-effective?
6. Does the method leave residues in the environment?
7. Can by-kill from the method be minimised?
8. Does the method endanger people?
9. Does the method kill humanely?

The Parliamentary Commissioner for the Environment's conclusion with regards to 1080 was, "It is not perfect, but given how controversial it remains, I for one expected that it would not be as effective and safe as it is".

The Parliamentary Commissioner reached the following conclusions regarding the possible alternatives to 1080 poison currently available in New Zealand.

=== Pindone, diphacinone, and coumatetralyl ===
Pindone, diphacinone, and coumatetralyl are the first-generation anticoagulants most commonly used for pest control. They are generally very effective at controlling rats to keep their numbers low, but cannot effectively deal with sudden population surges. Anticoagulants break down very slowly in water and soil. They also accumulate in the liver tissue of live animals that have been exposed to the poison (either by eating bait or feeding on an animal that has eaten bait) and in carcasses. They are also the most inhumane of the poisons currently used. By-kill of native species is a significant risk from the use of first-generation anticoagulants. Different types of anticoagulants need to be rotated to avoid populations becoming bait-shy or building up resistance.

=== Brodifacoum ===
Brodifacoum is a second-generation anticoagulant. It is licensed for killing possums and rats. Like 1080, it will kill stoats that feed on poisoned animals. It has been successfully used in aerial operations to completely eradicate possums, rats, and stoats on several offshore islands and fenced 'mainland islands' that are now sanctuaries for endangered animals, but it is not currently registered in New Zealand for general aerial use on the mainland. Brodifacoum takes a very long time to break down in soil and water and accumulates in the tissue of exposed animals for years. Consequently, there is a very high risk of by-kill: it is known to have killed at least 21 species of native birds, including kiwi, kākā, kākāriki and tūī. It is also widely considered a very inhumane poison.

=== Cyanide ===
Cyanide has been used in New Zealand since the 1940s, and is licensed for killing possums and wallabies. It is a highly lethal, broad-spectrum poison that depletes cells of energy, quickly resulting in respiratory arrest and death. Ground-laid cyanide has killed native species and other animals in the past (including kiwi, kea, weka, and bats) and it takes only a tiny amount of cyanide to kill a human. While there are antidotes to cyanide poisoning, their effectiveness is controversial and the rapid action of the poison limits the time in which they can be used. Its effectiveness varies because of bait shyness.

=== Cholecalciferol ===
Cholecalciferol naturally occurs as vitamin D_{3} in many foods, including fish. It was developed as a poison to control rats and mice in the 1980s. It works by leaching calcium from the bones of the poisoned animal into its bloodstream, leading to organ failure. Cholecalciferol will reduce populations of possums and rats, but not stoats, since it does not bioaccumulate in animals. It breaks down readily in the environment and the risk of by-kill is considered to be low. Cholecalciferol is more expensive to produce than 1080. Some promising results have been obtained by combining cholecalciferol with other substances, such as aspirin, to make it more cost-effective and faster acting. Cholecalciferol is very inhumane.

=== Para-aminopropiophenone ===
Para-aminopropiophenone (PAPP) was developed to control stoats, weasels, and feral cats, and registered for use in New Zealand in 2011. It kills by preventing red blood cells from carrying oxygen. PAPP kills stoats directly, but not possums and rats. It is approved for use in paste form or in fresh minced meat, so will only provide effective stoat control as part of intensive ground control. The risk of by-kill is likely to be low since it does not leave residues in the environment.

=== Zinc phosphide ===
Zinc phosphide (microencapsulated zinc phosphide paste) has been widely used overseas for decades, predominantly to control rats and mice on agricultural land. It causes death by heart or respiratory failure. In August 2011, the New Zealand Environmental Protection Authority approved the import and manufacture of microencapsulated zinc phosphide (MZP paste) as an alternative to 1080 for the ground control of possums. The application was made by Pest Tech Limited, with support from Connovation Ltd, Lincoln University, and the Animal Health Board. It will be used as an additional vertebrate poison in certain situations. Unlike 1080, it cannot be used for aerial application.

=== Sodium nitrite ===
Sodium nitrite is a naturally occurring substance commonly used as a meat preservative, but toxic at higher doses. It kills in a similar way as PAPP, by reducing the ability of red blood cells to carry oxygen (methemoglobinemia). Sodium nitrite is expected to be registered for use in for killing possums, but not rats. It will not control stoats because it will not knock down rat populations or bioaccumulate in poisoned animals. It does not leave residues in the environment and the risk of by-kill is expected to be low. It is much more humane than 1080.

=== Trapping ===
Ground operations of which trapping is an important component have been shown to help populations of native birds. Possums, rats, and stoats can all be killed with traps. However, an intensive ground operation will typically involve trapping possums and stoats, but poisoning rats because there are so many more of them and they reproduce quickly. In a mass event, populations of rodents rapidly increase as much as ten-fold, and traps simply cannot be deployed rapidly enough or in sufficient numbers to knock them down.

Some terrain is too rugged or dangerous for trapping, and trapping is not practical on a large scale. In one day, a single trapper can check traps on tens of hectares, whereas an aerial 1080 drop can cover tens of thousands of hectares. Once a trap has 'snapped', it will not catch another animal unless it is reset. Traps need to be checked and reset regularly, which makes them labour-intensive. Self-resetting traps, such as the Goodnature trap, are being developed and trialled, and could in the future significantly reduce labour costs and increase the cost-effectiveness of ground control operations.

Twenty three species of native birds have been reported as having been killed by leg-hold traps, and many kiwi have suffered leg or beak damage. These traps are now required to be set up off the ground on conservation land where kiwi or weka (which are ground-dwelling birds) live.

=== Biological control ===
Biological control has been likened to the 'Holy Grail' of pest control by a number of sources, and was a major focus for research funding during the 1990s and 2000s in both New Zealand and Australia. Most of the methods proposed involved some form of genetic engineering, and if developed further would attract a great deal of public opposition. No biological control method has therefore yet gained widespread acceptance as a viable alternative to 1080.

== See also ==
- Common brushtail possum in New Zealand
- Biodiversity of New Zealand
- Conservation in New Zealand
- Hunting in New Zealand
- Animal welfare in New Zealand
- Predator Free 2050
