= Animal research in New Zealand =

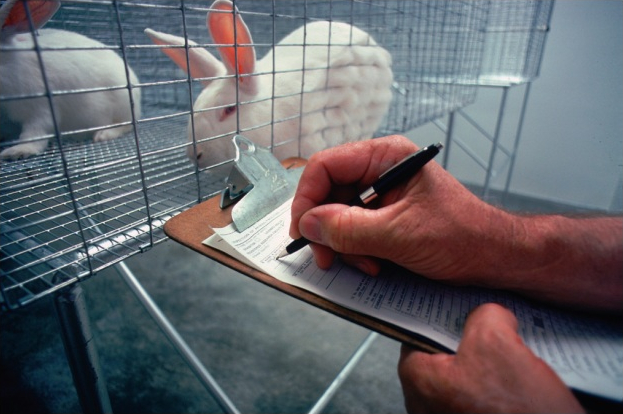
Lab animal care

In New Zealand, animals are used in many situations for research, testing and teaching (RTT).

Animal use in RTT is strictly controlled under the Animal Welfare Act 1999 and organisations using animals must follow an approved code of ethical conduct. This sets out the policies and procedures that need to be adopted and followed by the organisation and its animal ethics committee (AEC). Every project must be approved and monitored by an AEC which includes lay members. The principles of the Three Rs are embodied in the Animal Welfare Act, the operation of all AECs, and all activities that involve the use of animals in research.

== Statistics ==
The Ministry for Primary Industries reported that 310,287 animals were used in New Zealand in 2014. The most common species used were cattle (24.3%), mice (18.8%), sheep (14.4%), fish (13.3%), birds (10.2%) and deer (8.1%). The large number of livestock used in research reflects the large amount of agricultural research conducted in New Zealand.

The most common areas of research were 'basic biological research' (24.3%), 'veterinary research' (19.2%), 'teaching' (16.9%) and 'animal husbandry' (15.4%). According to the Ministry for Primary Industries, only 24% of animals die, or are euthanised, as part of the research. In 2014 1.9% of animals used were transgenic.

== Legislation ==
In New Zealand, it is legal under the Animal Welfare Act 1999 to use animals for research, testing and teaching (RTT) purposes. Because the potential benefits to humans, animals or the environment may result in harm to animals, RTT carries significant responsibilities and strict legislative obligations.

Part 6 of the Animal Welfare Act applies specifically to the use of animals for RTT purposes.

Under the act:

- Any person or organisation wishing to manipulate animals for RTT purposes must do so under a code of ethical conduct (CEC) approved by the Director-General of the Ministry for Primary Industries, and must establish an animal ethics committee (AEC) to oversee the use of animals within the institution.
- The CEC sets out the policies and procedures to ensure that its AEC can operate effectively and that the organisation can meet its obligations under the act.
- The membership of the AEC is set within the legislation and must include three members whose independence from the organisation adds credibility and transparency to the AEC's activities. These include:

- a nominee of an approved animal welfare organisation (such as the SPCA);
- a nominee of the New Zealand Veterinary Association; and
- a layperson to represent the public interest and who is nominated by a local government body.

- Animal ethics committees monitor researchers and the animal use that they have approved.
- Organisations using animals for RTT must undergo an independent audit at a maximum of every five years to ensure compliance with the act and with their own CEC.
- Records must be kept for all animals used for the purposes of RTT for five years. Code holders are required to submit an annual return, which includes the number of animals used and the impact on their welfare. The statistics supplied to the Ministry for Primary Industries are published each year as an appendix to the National Animal Ethics Advisory Committee annual reports.

== Replacement, Reduction and Refinement ==
Replacement, Reduction and Refinement (the Three Rs) relate to the ethical use of animals in RTT.

- Replacement – wherever possible, animals should be replaced with non-animal alternatives. For example: computer modelling.
- Reduction – numbers of animals should be the minimum necessary to achieve a meaningful result.
- Refinement – pain and distress should be reduced as much as possible. For example: by using painkillers; by ensuring appropriate housing; or by ensuring the skill of those involved in the use and care of animals.

The Three Rs are supported by the New Zealand Three Rs Programme, a collaboration between the Massey University Animal Welfare Science and Bioethics Centre, the Ministry for Primary Industries, the Australian and New Zealand Council for the Care of Animals in Research and Teaching (ANZCCART) and the National Animal Ethics Advisory Committee. The key aims of the programme are:

- to promote understanding and application of the Three Rs in New Zealand;
- to encourage new Three Rs strategies in New Zealand;
- to profile New Zealand's Three Rs contributions nationally and internationally
- to network and liaise with other Three Rs centres internationally

The Three Rs have been incorporated into New Zealand's legislation as can be seen in the following section on AEC considerations.

== Animal ethics committees ==
The legislation requires that AEC members consider any RTT project using animals. Their questions must include the following:

- Are the scientific or educational objectives credible?
- What is the potential harm to the animals and how can it be minimised (refinement)?
- Is the experimental design credible?
- Are animals necessary and, if so, is the choice of species appropriate (replacement)?
- Can a less sentient species be used?
- Are the animal numbers the minimum necessary to get a meaningful result (reduction)?
- What procedures are in place to care for the animals (refinement)?
- Are those involved in the project suitably qualified (refinement)?
- What measures have been taken to ensure that experimental work is not being duplicated (reduction)?

In considering projects, AECs may approve the work, they may require certain conditions to be put in place before approval is granted, or they may reject the proposal. They are also required to monitor compliance with any approved project, and can suspend or revoke the approval if necessary.

== The National Animal Ethics Advisory Committee ==
The National Animal Ethics Advisory Committee (NAEAC) is an independent committee whose membership includes animal welfare experts, veterinarians, scientists and lay people. It provides independent, expert advice to the Minister for Primary Industries on policy and practices relating to the use of animals in RTT. The committee also provides advice and support to AECs to maximise good decision-making. Assistance is provided in the following ways:

- AEC workshops;
- provision of induction packs for new AEC members;
- publication of policies and procedures;
- distribution of newsletters;
- response to queries from AECs;
- publication of an 'occasional paper' series on issues of importance to AECs;
- visits to regional AECs.

NAEAC also presents an annual "Three Rs Award" which recognises achievement in implementation of the Three Rs by an individual or organisation.

== Organisational bodies ==
- ANZCCART – Australian and New Zealand Council for the Care of Animals in Research and Teaching
- MPI – Ministry for Primary Industries
- NAEAC – National Animal Ethics Advisory Committee
- SPCA – Society for Prevention of Cruelty to Animals

== See also ==
- Animal welfare in New Zealand
- Agriculture in New Zealand
