= Maltokinase =

Identifiers
- EC no.: 2.7.1.175

Databases
- IntEnz: IntEnz view
- BRENDA: BRENDA entry
- ExPASy: NiceZyme view
- KEGG: KEGG entry
- MetaCyc: metabolic pathway
- PRIAM: profile
- PDB structures: RCSB PDB PDBe PDBsum
Search
- PMC: articles
- PubMed: articles
- NCBI: proteins

Maltokinase (EC 2.7.1.175) is an enzyme with systematic name ATP:alpha-maltose 1-phosphotransferase. It catalyses the following chemical reaction

ATP +
maltose
ADP +
maltose 1-phosphate

The enzyme characterised from the bacterium, Mycobacterium bovis, converts the disaccharide, maltose, to maltose 1-phosphate by transferring a phosphate group from the cofactor, adenosine triphosphate (ATP), which is converted to adenosine diphosphate (ADP). The enzyme requires magnesium ions (Mg^{2+}) for activity.
