= Rachel Tanner =

British Immunologist

Associate Professor Rachel Tanner
- Born: London, UK
- Education: University of Oxford
- Scientific career
- Fields: Tuberculosis; Vaccines; Immunology
- Website: www.jenner.ac.uk/team/rachel-tanner

Rachel Tanner is an immunologist working at the University of Oxford. She won the UK 'Women of the Future' Award for Science in 2019.

== Research ==
Tanner researches tuberculosis with a focus on immune correlates of protection and the host immune response to TB vaccination. She has worked extensively on in vitro functional assays for vaccine testing to reduce the number of animals used in 'challenge' or infection experiments, and has led an NC3Rs funded project to transfer one such assay internationally. Her research interests also include the specific and non-specific effects of the BCG vaccine across different populations, and development of a vaccine against Mycobacterium bovis in cattle. Initial research was on HIV vaccines with the Centre for HIV-AIDS Vaccine Immunology (CHAVI) at the Weatherall Institute of Molecular Medicine, University of Oxford, but since her work has moved to TB. From 2010-2022, Tanner worked at the Jenner Institute, during which she received a VALIDATE Fellowship. She is now an Associate Professor in One Health at the Department of Biology.

In 2020, Tanner was part of the Oxford COVID-19 Vaccine Trial Group which developed and tested the safety and efficacy of the ChAdOx1 nCoV-19 vaccine (AZD1222) against SARS-CoV-2. She appeared working on this vaccine in the documentary film Life in a Day 2020, which was directed by Kevin MacDonald and premiered at the Sundance Film Festival.

== Awards ==
- AAALAC International Global 3Rs Award 2021
- University of Oxford Divisional Teaching Excellence Award 2021
- Life Sciences Editors JEDI (Justice, Equality, Diversity and Inclusion) Award 2021
- Women of the Future Award for Science 2019
- Tuberculosis Vaccine Initiative Young Scientist Award 2017

== Career ==
Tanner was awarded a BA (Hons) in Biological Sciences from Wadham College and a DPhil in Clinical Medicine from St Cross College, both at the University of Oxford. She was funded in the latter by the Universities Federation for Animal Welfare (UFAW). She was a Fulford Junior Research Fellow of Somerville College from 2017 to 2019, a Lecturer in Human Sciences at Wadham College from 2017 to 2022, and a Research Fellow at Wolfson College. Tanner is currently an Associate Professor at the Department of Biology and a Tutorial Fellow at St Hugh's College.

== Publications ==
Tanner has co-authored over 60 peer-reviewed publications.
