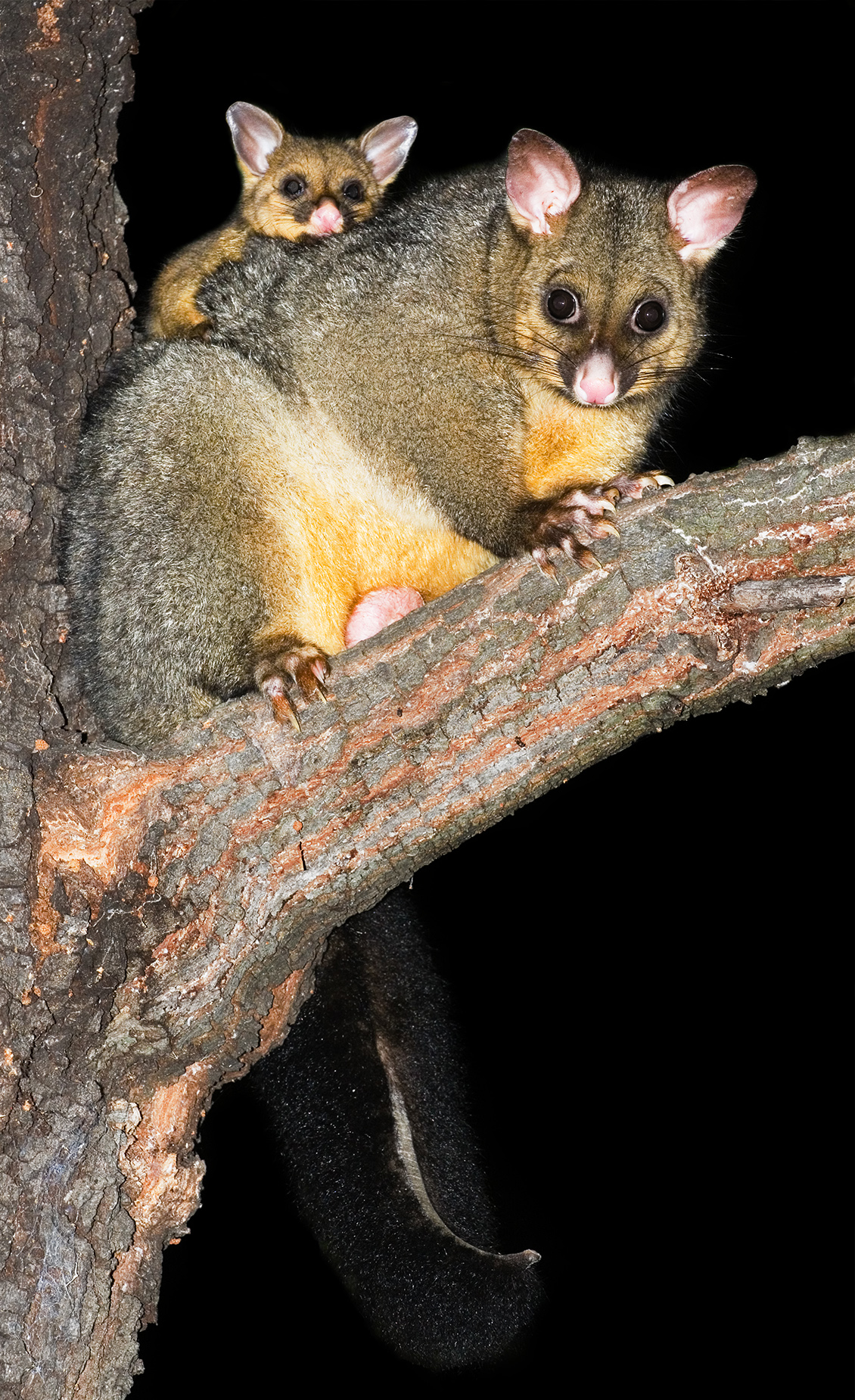
- At Austins Ferry, Tasmania

Conservation status
- Least Concern (IUCN 3.1)

Scientific classification
- Kingdom: Animalia
- Phylum: Chordata
- Class: Mammalia
- Infraclass: Marsupialia
- Order: Diprotodontia
- Family: Phalangeridae
- Genus: Trichosurus
- Species: T. vulpecula

Binomial name
- Trichosurus vulpecula (Kerr, 1792)

Subspecies
- T. v. vulpecula (South-eastern common brushtail possum and central brushtail possum); T. v. arnhemensis (Northern brushtail possum); T. v. eburacensis (Cape York brushtail possum); T. v. johnsoni (Coppery brushtail possum); T. v. fuliginosus (Tasmanian brushtail possum); T. v. hypoleucus (South-western brushtail possum or Koomal)
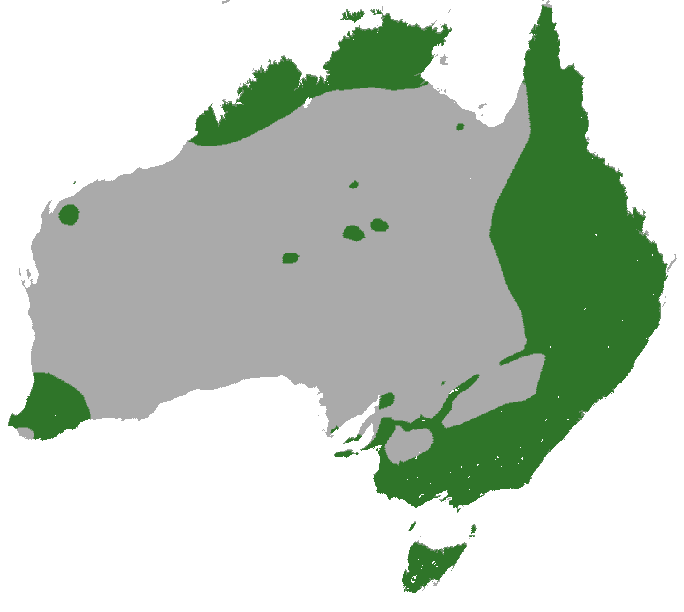
- Common brushtail possum native range

= Common brushtail possum =

Species of marsupial

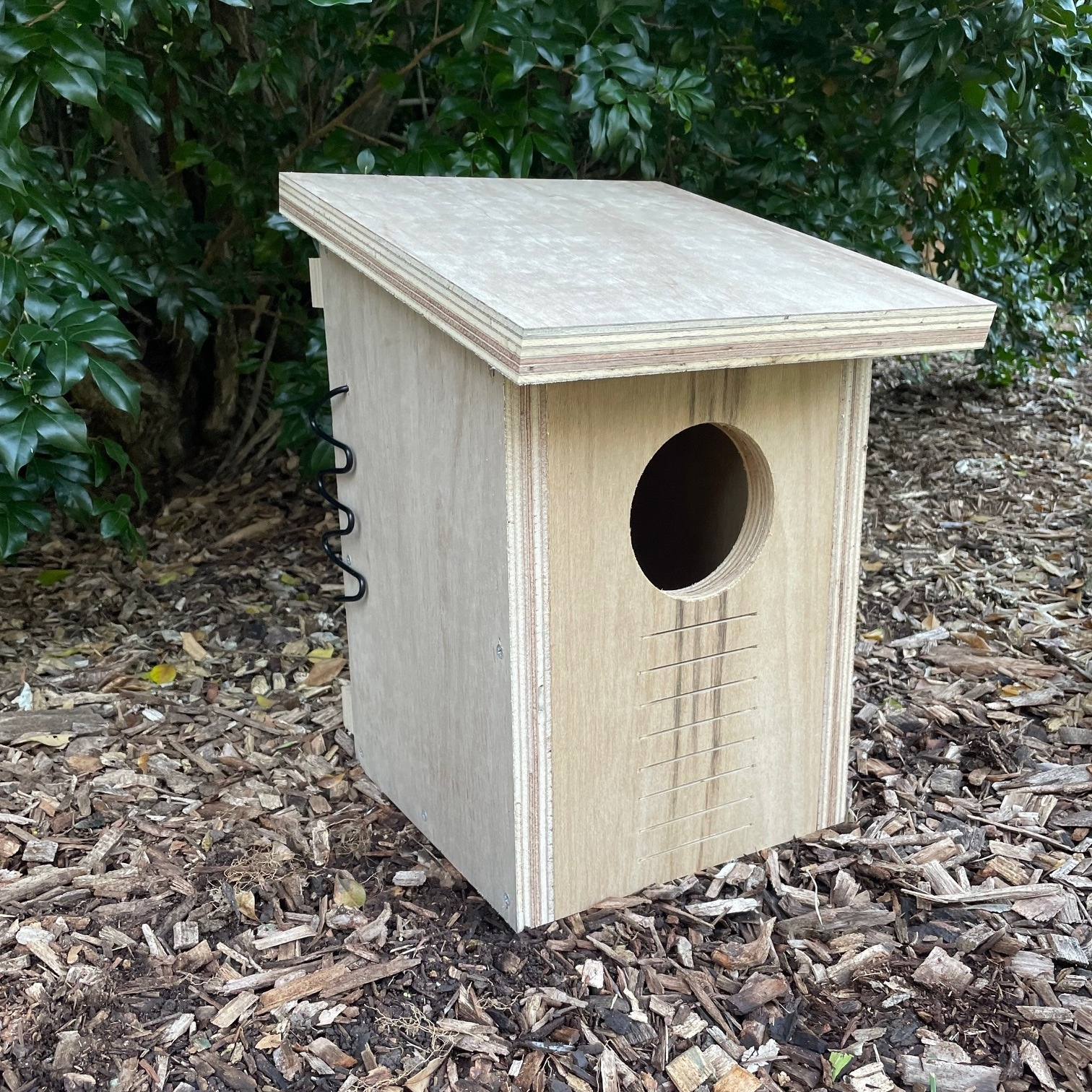
Brushtail possums nest in natural tree hollows that occur over many, many years to create a void that animals then find and use. With the loss of more and more large trees in suburban areas, nest boxes act as a hollow tree alternatives to provide an instant space for native animals to call home.

The common brushtail possum (Trichosurus vulpecula, from the Greek for "furry tailed" and the Latin for "little fox", previously in the genus Phalangista) is a nocturnal, semiarboreal marsupial of the family Phalangeridae, native to Australia and invasive in New Zealand, and the second-largest of the Australasian possums.

Like most possums, the common brushtail possum is nocturnal. It is mainly a folivore, but has been known to eat small mammals such as rats. In most Australian habitats, eucalyptus leaves are a significant part of the diet, but rarely the sole item eaten. Its tail is prehensile and naked on its lower underside. The four colour variations are silver-grey, brown, black, and gold.

It is the Australian marsupial most often seen by city dwellers, as it is one of few that thrive in cities and a wide range of natural and human-modified environments. Around human habitations, common brushtails are inventive and determined foragers with a liking for fruit trees, vegetable gardens, and kitchen raids. Its once vast distribution has been greatly affected by drought, epizootic disease and intrusion of invasive mammals into its habitat.

The common brushtail possum was introduced to New Zealand in the 1850s to establish a fur industry, but in the mild subtropical climate of New Zealand, and with few to no natural predators, it thrived to the extent that it became a major agricultural and conservation pest.

== Description ==
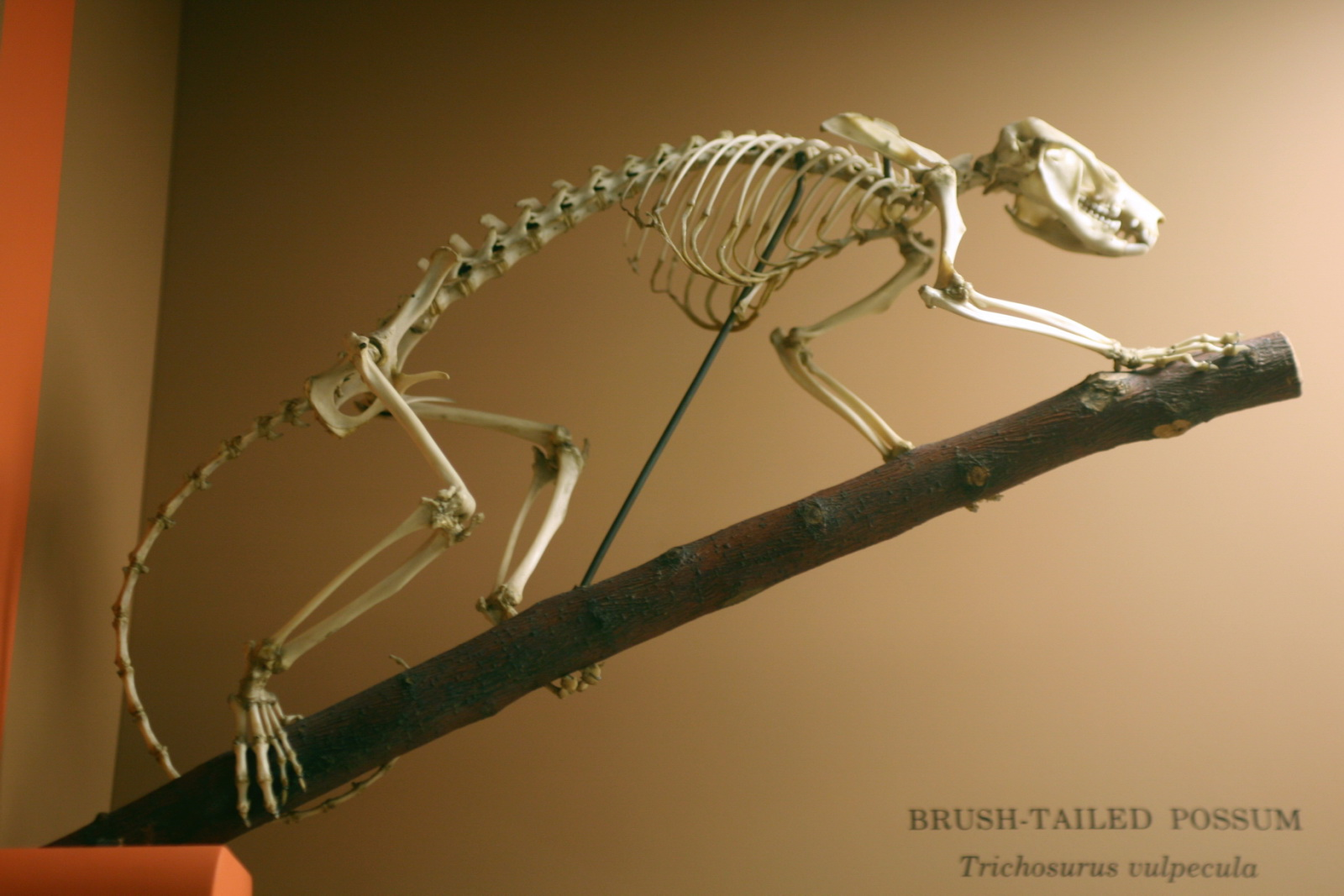
Skeleton

The common brushtail possum has large and pointed ears. Its bushy tail (hence its name) is adapted to grasping branches, prehensile at the end with a hairless ventral patch. Its fore feet have sharp claws and the first toe of each hind foot is clawless, but has a strong grasp. The possum grooms itself with the third and fourth toes which are fused together. It has a thick and woolly pelage that varies in colour depending on the subspecies. Colour patterns tend to be silver-grey, brown, black, red, or cream. The ventral areas are typically lighter and the tail is usually brown or black. The muzzle is marked with dark patches.

The common brushtail possum has a head and body length of 32–58 cm (13–23 in) with a tail length of 24–40 cm (9.4–16 in). It weighs 1.2–4.5 kg (2.6–9.9 lb). Males are generally larger than females. In addition, the coat of the male tends to be reddish at the shoulders. As with most marsupials, the female brushtail possum has a forward-opening, well-developed pouch. The chest of both sexes has a scent gland that emits a reddish secretion which stains that fur around it. It marks its territory with these secretions.

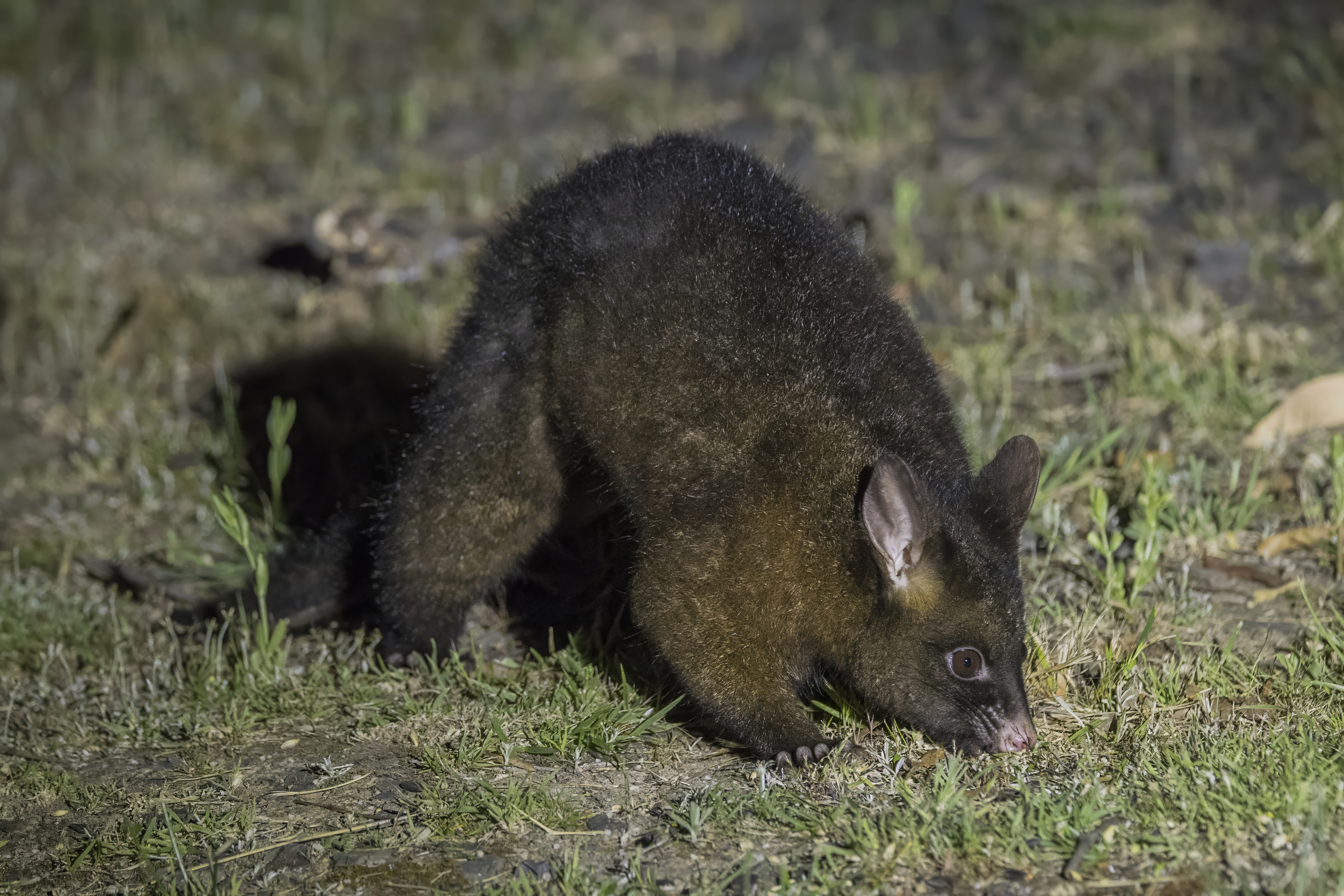
Dark brown

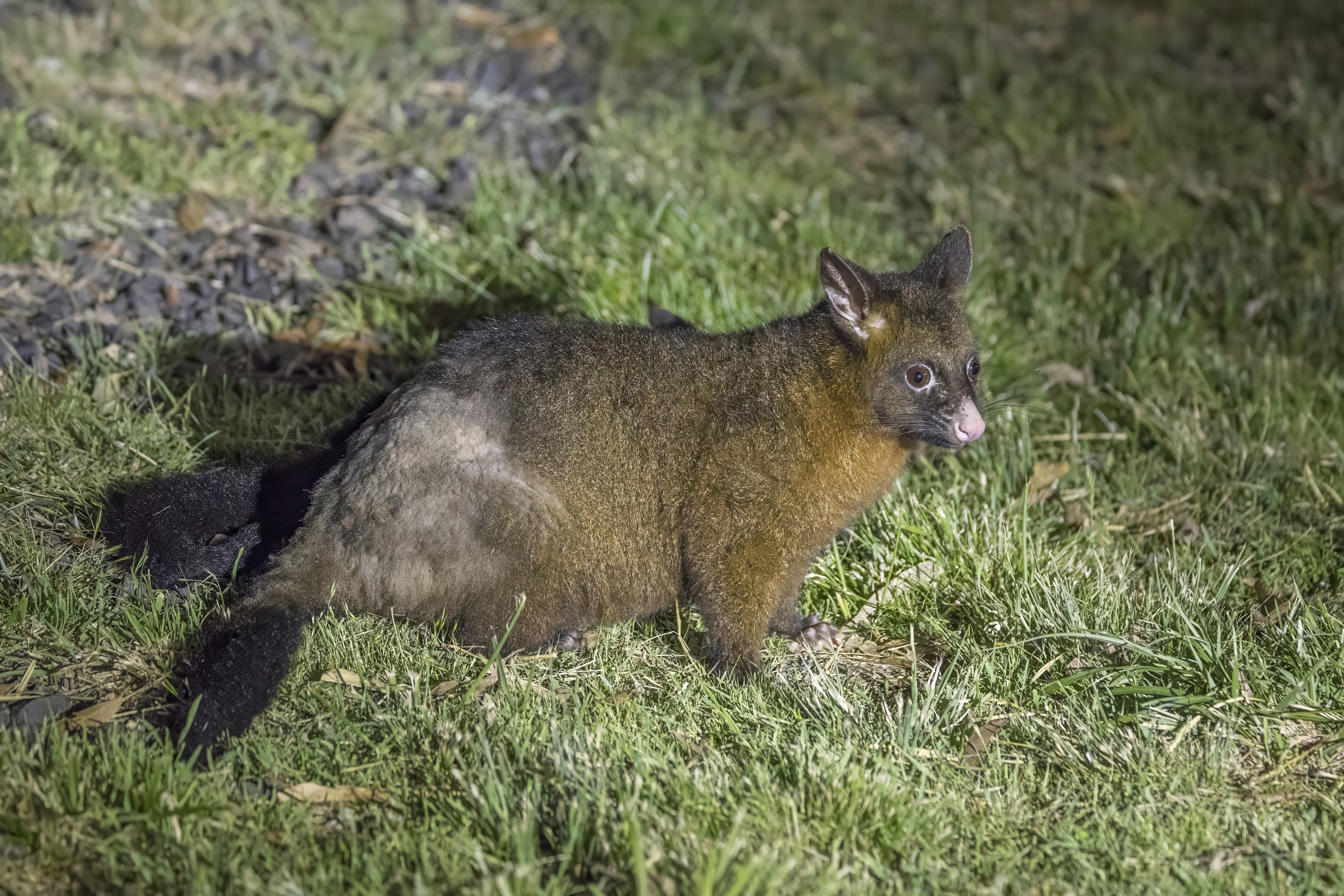
Medium brown

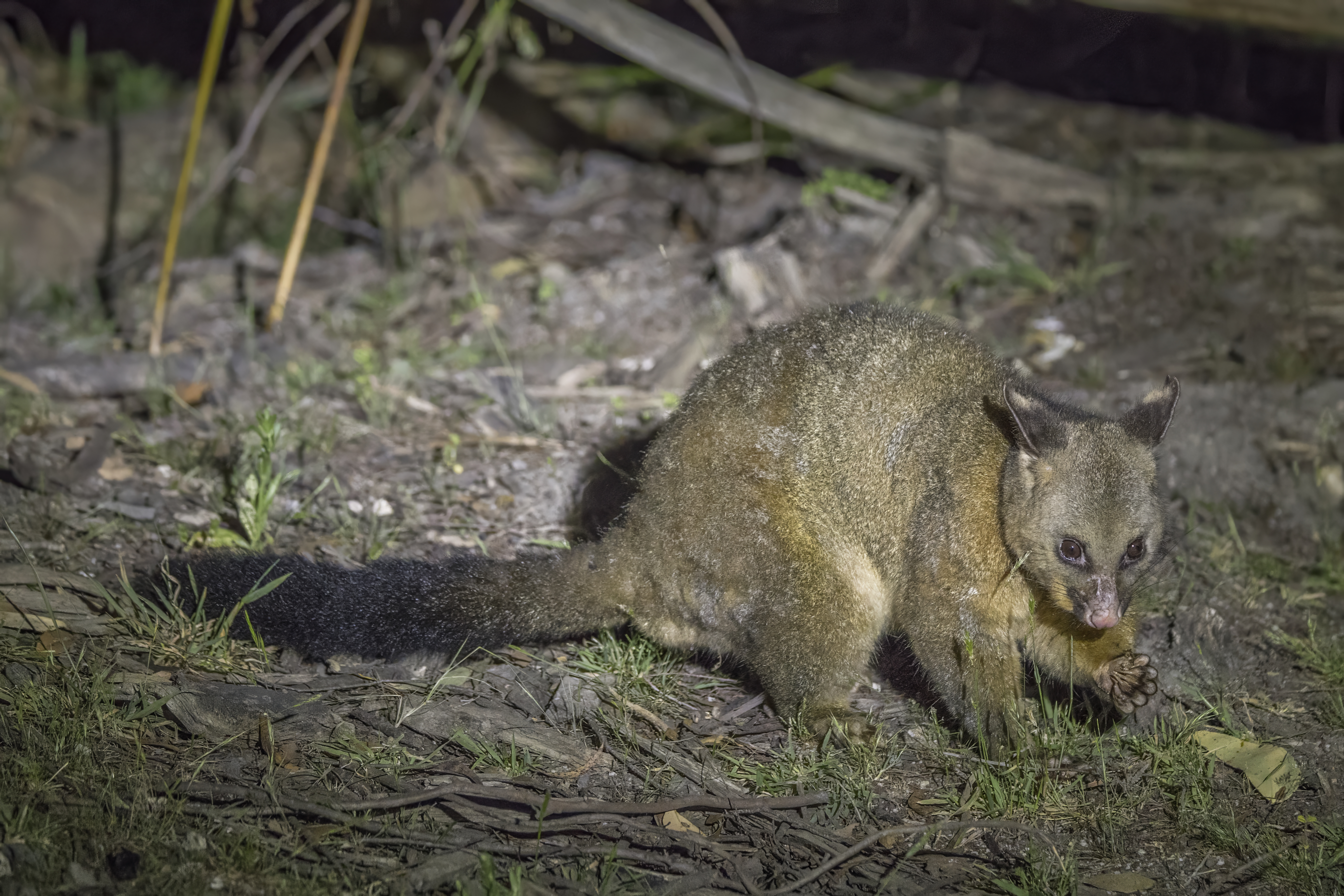
Light brown

== Biology and ecology ==
=== Range and habitat ===
The common brushtail possum is one of the most widespread marsupials of Australia. It is found throughout the eastern and northern parts of the continent, as well as some western regions, Tasmania and a number of offshore islands, such as Kangaroo Island and Barrow Island. Western Australia alone has several scattered population groups locally distinguished with given indigenous names: nunguin in Kimberley, walambari in Pilbara, wayurta in the desert areas, and bilda in Nullarbor Plain shared with South Australia among many others.

It is also widespread in New Zealand since its introduction in 1850. The common brushtail possum can be found in a variety of habitats, such as forests, semi-arid areas and even cultivated or urban areas. It is mostly a forest inhabiting species, however it is also found in treeless areas. In New Zealand, possums favour broadleaf-podocarp near farmland pastures. In southern beech forests and pine plantations, possums are less common. Overall, brushtail possums are more densely populated in New Zealand than in their native Australia. This may be because Australia has more fragmented eucalypt forests and more predators. In Australia, brushtail possums are threatened by humans, tiger quolls, dogs, foxes, cats, goannas, carpet snakes, and powerful owls. In New Zealand, brushtail possums are threatened only by humans and cats. The IUCN highlight the population trend in Australia as decreasing.

The northern subspecies of the common brushtail possum has declined substantially, with one study in Australia's Northern Territory finding a 22% reduction in the extent of occurrence of and a 50% reduction in the breadth of occupied environmental space. Analysis of contemporary occurrence points suggested that the species is contracting towards areas of higher rainfall, lower fire frequency, and higher vegetation cover. Little is known about the distribution of the species in the Pilbara. However, a paper published in the mid-2020s announced a discovery that the populations in the Pilbara, and in the Mid-West of Western Australia where the species is almost extinct, were genetically closer to the subspecies found on the east coast and South Australia, and the now presumed extinct Central Australian subspecies, than those in the South West of Western Australia.

=== Food and foraging ===
The common brushtail possum can adapt to numerous kinds of vegetation but it is largely omnivorous. It prefers Eucalyptus leaves, but also eats flowers, shoots, fruits, and seeds. It may also consume animal matter such as insects, birds' eggs and chicks, and other small vertebrates. Brushtail possums may eat three or four different plant species during a foraging trip, unlike some other arboreal marsupials, such as the koala and the greater glider, which focus on single species. The brushtail possum's rounded molars cannot cut Eucalyptus leaves as finely as more specialised feeders. They are more adapted to crushing their food, which enables them to chew fruit or herbs more effectively. The brushtail possums' caecum lacks internal ridges and cannot separate coarse and fine particles as efficiently as some other arboreal marsupials. The brushtail possum cannot rely on Eucalyptus alone to provide sufficient protein. Its more generalised and mixed diet, however, does provide adequate nitrogen.

=== Behaviour ===
Hissing and growling vocalisations

The common brushtail possum is largely arboreal and nocturnal. It has a mostly solitary lifestyle, and individuals keep their distance with scent markings (urinating) and vocalisations. They usually make their dens in natural places such as tree hollows and caves, but also use spaces in the roofs of houses. While they sometimes share dens, brushtails normally sleep in separate dens. Individuals from New Zealand use many more den sites than those from Australia. Brushtail possums compete with each other and other animals for den spaces, and this contributes to their mortality. This is likely another reason why brushtail possum population densities are smaller in Australia than in New Zealand. Brushtail possums are usually not aggressive towards each other and usually just stare with erect ears. They vocalise with clicks, grunts, hisses, alarm chatters, guttural coughs, and screeching.

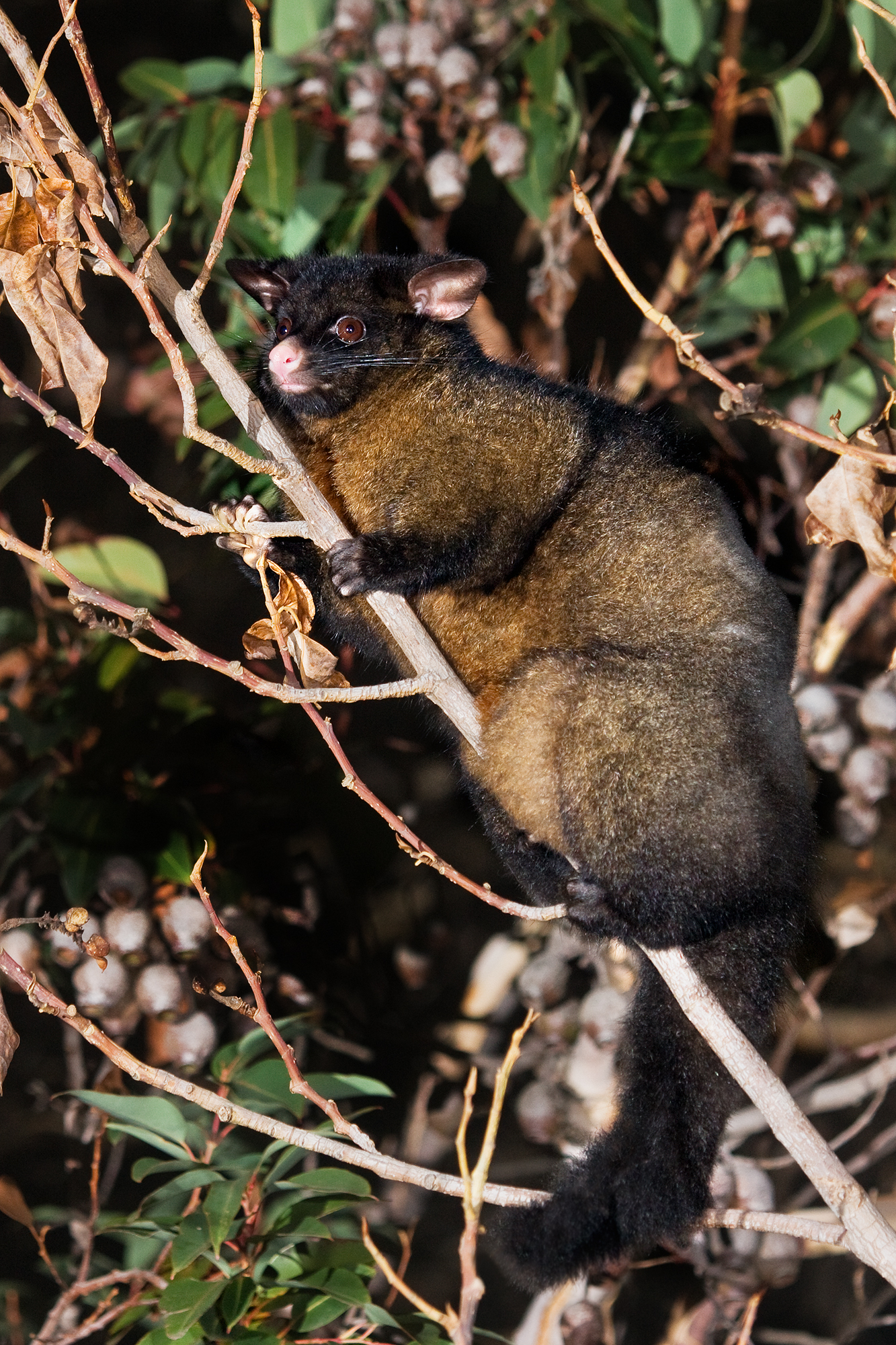
In a tree (dark brown form)

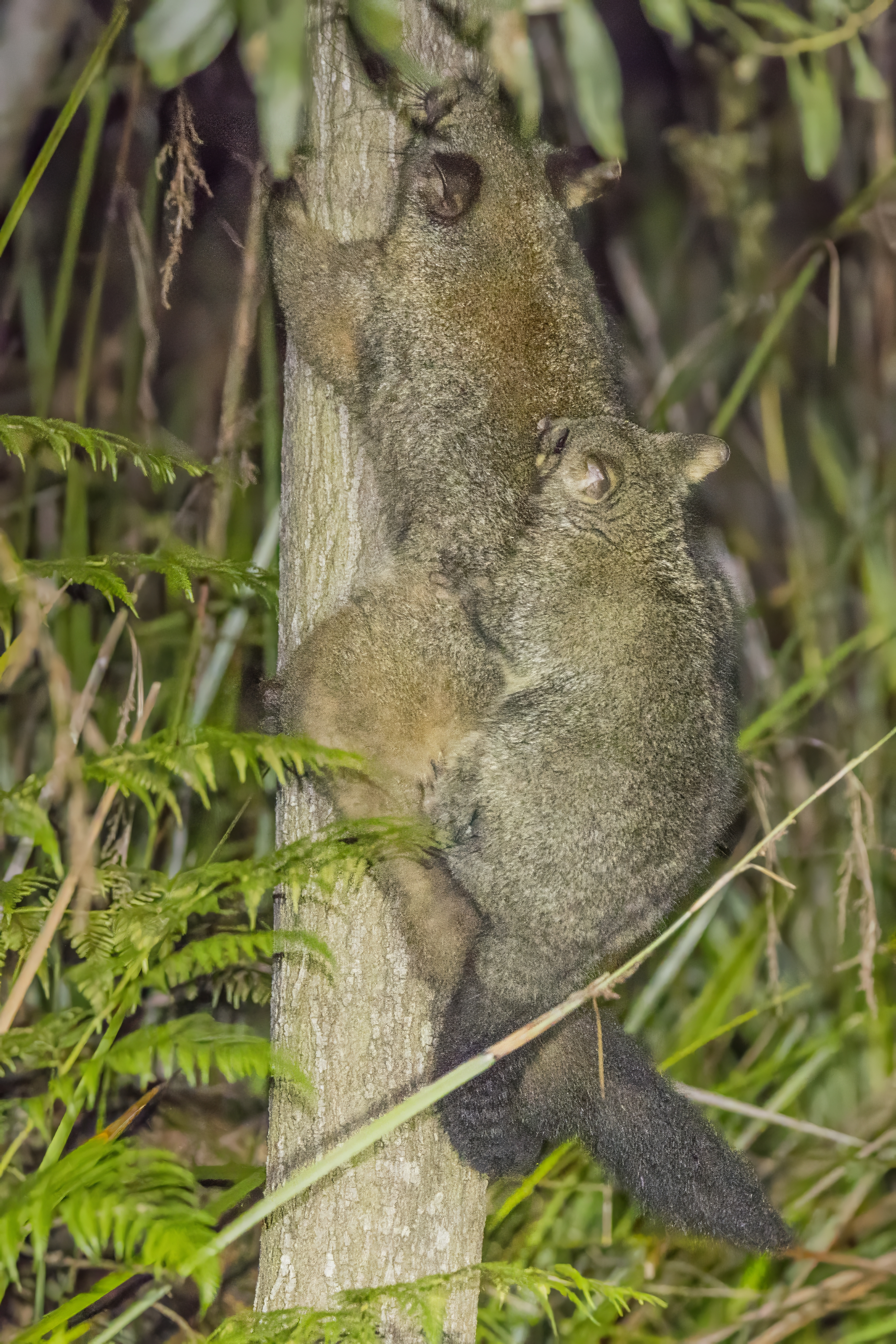
Climbing with joey (light brown form)

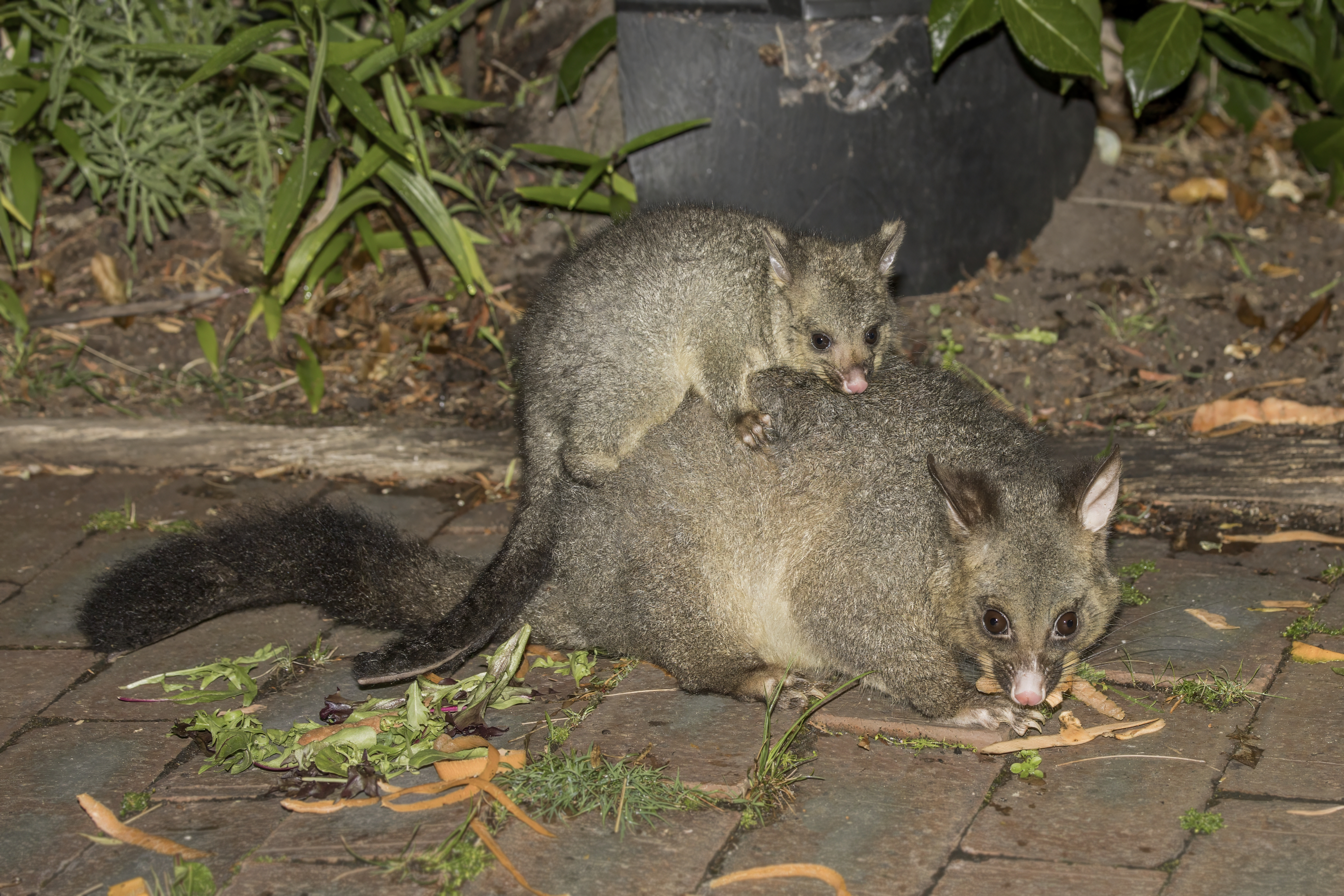
Feeding with joey

=== Reproduction and life history ===
The common brushtail possum can breed at any time of the year, but breeding tends to peak in spring, from September to November, and in autumn, from March to May, in some areas. Mating is promiscuous and random; some males can sire several young in a season, while over half sire none. In one Queensland population, males apparently need a month of consorting with females before they can mate with them. Females have a gestation period of 16–18 days, after which they give birth to single young. A newborn brushtail possum is only 1.5 cm (0.6 in) long and weighs only 2 g (0.07 oz). As usual for marsupials, the newborn may climb, unaided, through the female's fur and into the pouch and attach to a teat. The young develops and remains inside the mother's pouch for another 4–5 months. A preliminary study inducing ovulation through exposure of hormones resulted in changes to the appearance of mammary glands in females suggesting that mammary glands provide immunological protection to neonates through milk secretions. When older, the young is left in the den or rides on its mother's back until it is 7–9 months old. Females reach sexual maturity when they are a year old, and males do so at the end of their second year. Brushtail possums can live up to 13 years in the wild.

Female young have a higher survival rate than their male counterparts due to establishing their home ranges closer to their mothers, while males travel farther in search of new nesting sites, encountering established territories from which they may be forcibly ejected. In New Zealand's Ōrongorongo population, female young have been found to continue to associate with their mothers after weaning, and some inherit the prime den sites. A possible competition exists between mothers and daughters for dens, and daughters may be excluded from a den occupied by the mother. In forests with shortages of den sites, females apparently produce more sons, which do not compete directly for den sites, while in forests with plentiful den sites, female young are greater in number.

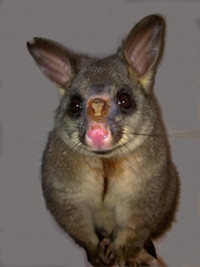
Brushtail possum exhibiting exudative dermatitis, a condition that often results from stress associated with overcrowding, particularly in young males attempting to assert territory

== Relationship with humans ==
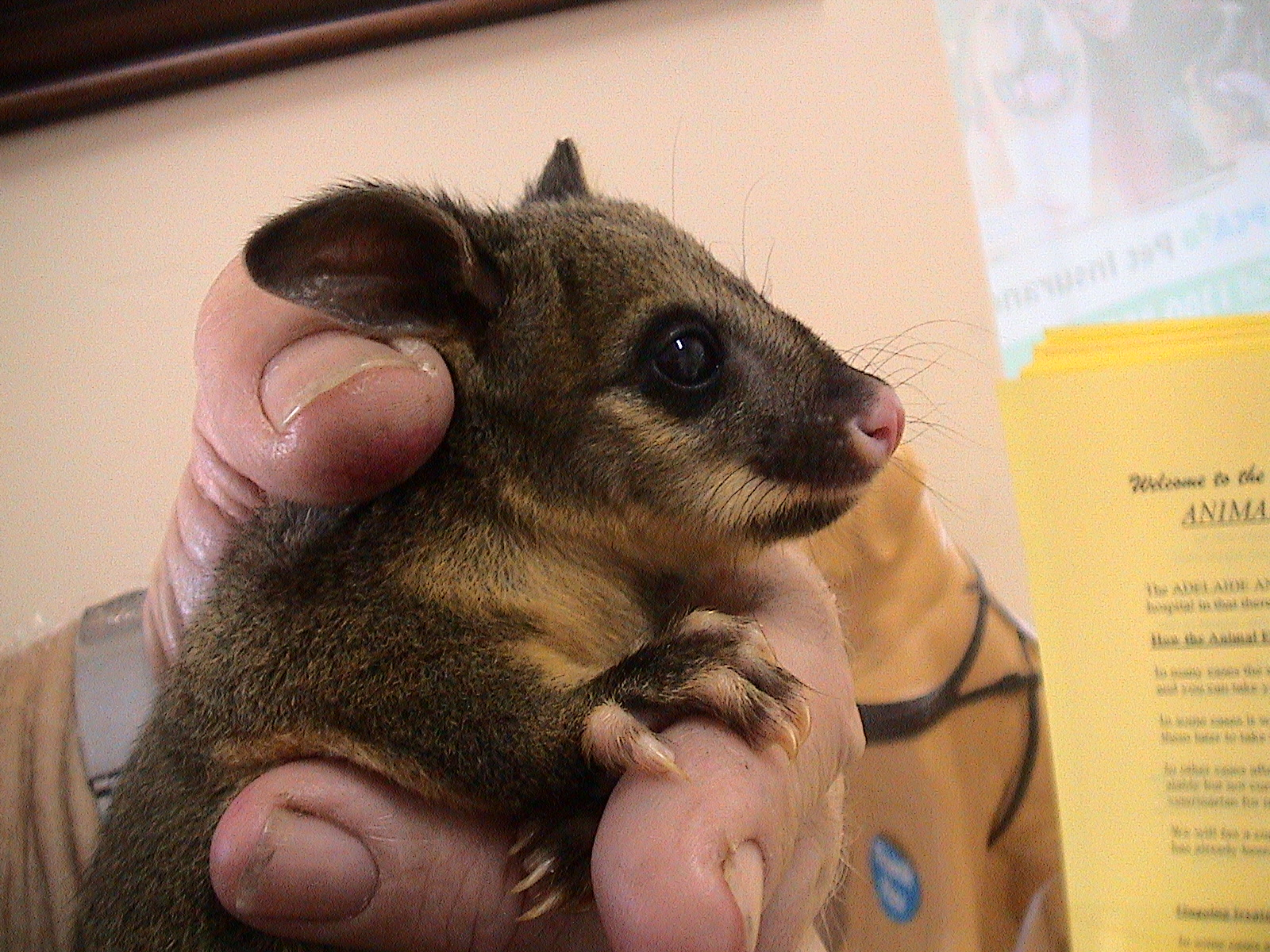
Abandoned joey handed to Fauna Rescue, Adelaide, South Australia

The common brushtail possum is considered a pest in some areas, as it is known to cause damage to pine plantations, regenerative forest, flowers, fruit trees, and buildings. Like other possums, it is rather tolerant of humans and can sometimes be hand fed, although it is not encouraged, as their claws are quite sharp and can cause infection or disease to humans if scratched. It is a traditional food source for some Indigenous Australian groups.

=== Australia ===
Although once hunted extensively for its fur, the common brushtail possum is largely protected throughout Australia. Tasmania gives crop-protection permits to landowners whose property has been damaged.

While its populations are declining in some regions due to habitat loss, urban populations indicate an adaptation to the presence of humans. In some mainland states, possum trapping is permitted when attempting to evict possums from human residences (e.g. roofs), but possums must be released after dusk within 24 hours of capture, no more than 50 m from the trapping site. In some states, e.g. Victoria, trapped possums may be taken to registered veterinarians to be euthanased. In South Australia, they are fully protected and permits are required for trapping possums in human residences or for keeping or rescuing sick or injured wild possums and other native animals. In Queensland, they can only be trapped by licensed commercial relocators who must release possums within 25 metres (82 ft) of the point of capture to ensure that an animal is not released into another possum's home range (possums are less likely to survive if they are released into a new area where they do not have access to a den or must compete with a neighbouring possum for den space).

=== New Zealand ===
Since its introduction from Australia by European settlers in the 1850s, the common brushtail possum has become a major threat to New Zealand native forests and birds. It is also a host for the highly contagious bovine tuberculosis. This is not an issue in Australia, where the disease has been eradicated.

By the 1980s, the peak population had reached an estimated 60–70 million, but is now down to an estimated 30 million due to control measures. The New Zealand Department of Conservation controls possum numbers in many areas via the aerial dropping of 1080-laced bait. Hunting is not restricted, but the population seems to be stable despite the annual killing of thousands of the animals.

=== Hunting ===
Possums are a pest in New Zealand and Tasmania, where they are culled for their meat and fur. However, due to tuberculosis being prevalent in many possums across most of New Zealand, possums are generally only eaten in Northland, where the disease does not exist in possums. In Northland, possum meat has even been used in meat pies.

In Tasmania, possum meat is served at some restaurants. On Bruny Island, possum meat is sold at Bruny Island Game Meats, which also sell it at farmer's markets, including in Hobart.
