= Animal welfare in New Zealand =

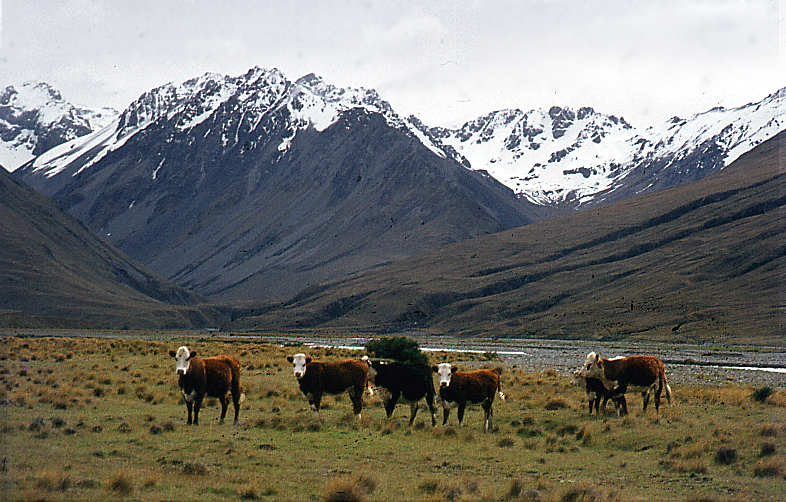
Hereford cattle grazing in the Macaulay River valley in South Canterbury. Most cattle remain outdoors for most of the year but wintering barns are sometimes used for dairy cows.

Animal welfare in New Zealand is governed by the Animal Welfare Act 1999 and a number of organisations actively advocate for both animal welfare and animal rights. Pest control and farming practices have been scrutinised with respect to animal welfare issues. The legality of killing dogs and cats for consumption has also been criticised.

Agriculture is central to the New Zealand economy, and many animal welfare concerns relate to farming. Although the country has high animal welfare standards, a 2016 report by the National Animal Welfare Advisory Committee found that the pork industry did not accept its obligations under the Pigs Code of Welfare (2010), and that failure to follow the code was commonplace.

== Animal welfare issues ==
The New Zealand economy relies heavily on agriculture and many animal welfare issues involve the farming sector.

Although New Zealand has high animal welfare standards, a 2016 report from the National Animal Welfare Advisory Committee, reviewing the use of farrowing crates on pig farms, found that the pork industry does not accept its requirements under the Pigs Code of Welfare (2010), and that failure by industry to act in accordance with the Pigs Codes of Welfare (2010) is commonplace. Additionally, the Pigs Code of Welfare (2010) contradicts animals rights to express normal patterns of behaviour as outlined in the Animal Welfare Act 1999.

There were animal welfare concerns on the controversial CraFarms and in June 2011 five people involved with Crafers Taharua Dairy Farm pleaded not guilty to 714 charges of alleged animal welfare offences.

In 2013 a farmer was convicted of animal welfare offences after breaking or injuring the tails of 230 cows and he was banned from owning cows. The case was the worst of its type that had been seen by the authorities.

In 2015 a farm manager was convicted of a number of animal welfare offences and was sentenced to four and half year imprisonment.

A resource consent application under the Resource Management Act 1991 for the intensive farming of cattle in the Mackenzie Basin in 2009 attracted opposition because of concerns over animal welfare, even though animal welfare is not a part of the RMA. The application was "called in" under provisions of the RMA.

The usage of 1080 in New Zealand (a pest control and animal health measure) attracts some opposition on animal welfare grounds but a 2007 assessment of 1080 (sodium fluoroacetate) concluded that the benefits outweighed the risks.

In 2010 Landcare Research prepared a paper for MAF Biosecurity New Zealand called How humane are our pest control tools? Various vertebrate toxic agents such as 1080, Brodifacoum, Cholecalciferol and so on, kill traps in mammal species, in-burrow rabbit control methods and leg hold traps, rotenone, alphachloralose and DRC-1339 looked at the 'animal welfare impact' (humaneness) of these control tools. The paper describes in detail how various toxins affect different animals. Information on level of consciousness at various times/events after dosing are still needed to fully assess its negative experiences and humaneness.

=== Agricultural imports ===
Many New Zealand animal welfare standards do not apply to imports, including prohibitions on battery cages, gestation crates, and mulesing. A 2024 report by Animal Policy International and the New Zealand SPCA found that all of New Zealand's imported wool, 90% of pork, 80% of liquid eggs, and 70% of fish come from countries that allow practices that are prohibited in New Zealand.

As of 2023, two-thirds of pork eaten in New Zealand is imported from countries with lower pig welfare standards, such as the United States and Canada, which can accordingly produce it more cheaply.

=== Animal research ===
Animal research is regulated by the Animal Welfare Act 1999 and organisations using animals must follow an approved code of ethical conduct. This sets out the policies and procedures that need to be adopted and followed by the organisation and its animal ethics committee (AEC). Every project must be approved and monitored by an AEC which includes lay members.

=== Companion animals ===
After a Tongan man living in New Zealand cooked his dog in his back yard in 2009, calls were made to ban the practice, but this did not happen.

=== Livestock transportation ===
On 14 April 2021, the Government of New Zealand announced that, in order to raise animal welfare standards, it had decided to phase out the export of livestock by sea by 2023 after a transition period of up to two years. It was the first country in history to do so; activists called on Australia and other states to follow suit.

=== Wildlife smuggling ===
New Zealand has a number of rare and endangered species and there have been cases of wildlife smuggling.

The Wildlife Enforcement Group, a group of three government departments, collectively investigate smuggling to and from New Zealand. The three agencies are the New Zealand Customs Service, the Ministry of Agriculture and Forestry and the Department of Conservation.

New Zealand is a signatory to CITES (Convention on International Trade in Endangered Species of Wild Fauna and Flora) which was set up to ensure that international trade in specimens of wild animals and plants does not threaten their survival. CITES is administered by the Department of Conservation.

== Organisations ==
A number of organisations in New Zealand actively pursue animal welfare issues.

The Royal New Zealand Society for the Prevention of Cruelty to Animals (RNZSPCA or more commonly, SPCA), the longest established animal welfare organisation in New Zealand, was formed in Dunedin in 1882 and was inspired by the English Society for the Prevention of Cruelty to Animals.

SAFE (Save Animals From Exploitation) is an animal rights advocacy group that has run a number of high-profile campaigns. SAFE ran a campaign against intensive pig farming featuring the comedian Mike King who had previously fronted an advertising campaign that promoted the sale of pork.

The international animal welfare charity, World Animal Protection has a branch in New Zealand.

== See also ==
- Agriculture in New Zealand
- Fauna of New Zealand
