= Animal Health Board (New Zealand) =

Organisation responsible for managing TB in New Zealand

- Abbreviation: AHB
- Predecessor: National Animal Health Advisory Committee
- Successor: TBfree New Zealand, managed by OSPRI
- Formation: October 29, 1993
- Dissolved: July 1, 2013
- Type: Incorporated society
- Purpose: Disease management agency
- Headquarters: Wellington, New Zealand
- Region served: New Zealand

The Animal Health Board (AHB) was the organisation legally responsible for managing and implementing the National Pest Management Plan (NPMP) for bovine tuberculosis (bovine TB) in New Zealand until it was disbanded on 1 July 2013. It was restructured to form TBfree New Zealand, the title of the programme for which it was responsible for managing before the formation of OSPRI.

The Biosecurity Act 1993 allowed any entity to apply for funding for a National Pest Management Strategy (NPMS). The Animal Health Board submitted a proposal to the New Zealand government for a 5-year National Pest Management Strategy (NPMS) for bovine TB in 1995; this was approved in 1998.

== Governance and funding ==
Governance of the AHB was managed by a Board of Directors, appointed by the member organisations through the AHB Representatives’ Committee. It was funded by central government, regional council contributions and the farming sector.

== TBfree ==
The successor to AHB, TBfree New Zealand and the national animal identification and tracing (NAIT) scheme, are both wholly owned subsidiaries of OSPRI (Operational Solutions for Primary Industries). OSPRI plans to leverage off the capabilities of each of its programmes to help protect and enhance the reputation of New Zealand's primary industries. Like the AHB, OSPRI continues to derive its powers from the Biosecurity Act 1993. OSPRI's mission statement, "To protect and enhance the reputation of New Zealand's primary industries" is inclusive of its TB eradication efforts and animal traceability work through its NAIT programme. OSPRI is made up of representatives from the farming sector as well as central and local government. It is accountable to its member organisations and also had responsibilities to the Minister for Primary Industries.

The TBfree programme is responsible for the AHB's applied research and development programme which, as of July 2013, operated on a budget of approximately $2.5 million per annum.

== See also ==
- Agriculture in New Zealand
