= Daughterless Carp Project =

Project to eradicate carp in Australia

The Daughterless Carp Project is a scientific project that is seeking to develop an eradication technique for carp. The technique involves genetically modifying European carp so they can only have male offspring. The introduction of daughterless carp into a population will lead to an all-male population, and the species will eventually die out. The technique has been developed for the CSIRO for the control of invasive carp populations in Australia.

== European carp in Australia ==
European carp were introduced into Australia in the 19th century. As carp are prolific breeders, hardy and highly adaptable, they quickly established themselves in Australia's waterways. In the 1960s, carp appeared in Australia's largest river system, the Murray–Darling basin.

The environmental impact of carp has been enormous. Carp fed on the bottom of the river, stirring up mud and increasing turbidity in the water. Because the fish breed in such large numbers, they have come to dominate the river system. Carp have been estimated to comprise 90% of the fish population of the Murray River with a density of one fish per cubic metre. As carp are established, eliminating them using conventional techniques is impossible.

== Scientific principle ==
Female fish development relies heavily on the hormone estrogen, which is produced by the transformation of androgen by the enzyme aromatase. Daughterless carp are produced by blocking the gene that produces aromatase, which prevents the development of female embryos and leads to an all-male population.

If fish are released into the environment, the gene will propagate throughout the population. Using an aggressive genetic modification that will rapidly self-propagate is possible. Once carp are introduced, terminal population decline would be inevitable, but if such fish were released into the carp's native range, it would decimate those populations. Also, a small risk exists that the gene could transfer over to native fish populations, eliminating them, as well; however, as carp do not breed with any native Australian species, the risk of the technology affecting anything other than the targeted pest in Australia is extremely low. Scientists have selected a less aggressive approach that would require constant seeding into the population. Left alone, the wild healthy genes would come to dominate.

== Development ==
The project was conceived in 1995. Initial trials were conducted using zebra fish, which were ideal candidates for initial trials, as they are closely related to carp and have very short generation times. Zebra fish populations have been successfully converted to 100% males. Laboratory trials on carp are now being conducted at Auburn University in Alabama. Initial results indicate that the daughterless techniques work well in carp. Should the trials be successful, field trials may occur in isolated systems in Australia in the late 2010s. When full scale deployment of this system would happen is unknown. In practice, the other population-control techniques, such as introduction of koi herpes virus, may be used in combination with daughterless carp to increase the effect.

== See also ==
- Sterile insect technique
