= Royal New Zealand Society for the Prevention of Cruelty to Animals =

New Zealand animal welfare charity

SPCA New Zealand
- Formation: 1933; 93 years ago
- Legal status: Charity
- Website: www.spca.nz

The Royal New Zealand Society for the Prevention of Cruelty to Animals (abbreviated as RNZSPCA or SPCA) is a New Zealand charitable society who work to promote the humane treatment of animals. The society consists of 30 animal shelters and 6 vet partnerships around New Zealand, including many in regional areas. Under the Animal Welfare Act 1999, SPCA inspectors have the exclusive power to investigate animal welfare complaints and prosecute abusers when necessary. The Royal NZ SPCA has initiated a range of animal welfare campaigns. It has launched public education campaigns about the humane treatment of animals, and has encouraged people to change their behaviour towards animals. SPCA has also run advocacy campaigns aimed at promoting law changes or questioning the legality of certain practices.

== History ==
The New Zealand SPCA was formed by settlers from England in 1882, inspired by the Society for the Prevention of Cruelty to Animals in England which was formed in 1824 after the passing of the Cruel Treatment of Cattle Act 1822 and which lobbied for the Cruelty to Animals Act 1835. This law was later replaced by the Cruelty to Animals Act 1876, a law which the settlers brought with them during the colonisation of New Zealand. The English society received royal patronage in 1840.

The New Zealand society first formed in Dunedin, and was followed by the establishment of the Auckland and Wellington branches in 1883 and 1884 respectively. From this point onwards, smaller communities began to establish their own branches of the society. In 1933 the separate local societies joined together to form the national New Zealand Society for the Prevention of Cruelty to Animals. There are now 47 individual branches across New Zealand. In 2008 the society celebrated 125 years of continued service with a march up Queen Street in Auckland.

On 17 June 2017, SPCA delegates voted to form one national organisation from 41 of its independent centres to create a unified and future-focused national entity. This change came into effect on 1 November 2017.

== Campaigns ==
=== Agricultural and entertainment animals ===
The group has also been involved in campaigns against alleged mistreatment of livestock. This includes campaigns against battery hens and pregnant sow pigs kept in "sow stalls" for up to 16 weeks without being able to move or turn around.

Individual branches of the group have also been involved in unofficial campaigns, not directly recognised by the national body. A successful campaign by the Auckland arm of the organisation saw an end to rodeos at the Auckland Easter Show. There have also been moves to have rodeos outlawed altogether.

=== Domestic pets ===
The charity group has collaborated with the New Zealand Veterinary Association on a campaign against the tail docking of dogs. The SPCA claimed tail docking was an outdated and cosmetic practice which offered no benefits but causes unnecessary pain to the animal. No decision was passed into law at the time. Tail docking later became an offence with the passing of the Animal Welfare (Care and Procedures) Regulations 2018, except where the procedure is performed by a veterinarian for therapeutic purposes.

In late 2012 an SPCA campaign which involved teaching dogs was featured on TV3 current affairs show Campbell Live. The campaign received international attention, and was covered by The Guardian, BBC News, Metro UK, Huffington Post, and the Financial Times.

=== Family violence ===
The SPCA also works in conjunction with the New Zealand Department of Child, Youth and Family Services to ensure that in households where animal abuse is occurring, possible indications of child abuse are looked into and in return where child abuse is found to be occurring, animals are looked into for possible maltreatment.

One of the SPCA's recurring campaigns is an annual "List of Shame", exemplifying the worst cases of animal abuse in New Zealand. The list is designed to bring public awareness to the abuse of animals and to alert the public to the close link between animal cruelty and domestic and family violence.

== Fundraising ==
SPCA relies on fundraising campaigns e.g. Annual Appeal, public donations and bequests for its operational income. The organisation needs $47m to operate and receives $2.5m from the government each year, which is earmarked for the Inspectorate.

== Activities ==
SPCA’s animal welfare education programme provides free support and educational resources. The programme is aligned with the New Zealand Curriculum and was launched nationwide in August 2016. The programme consists of four interlinked components, consisting of a portal for teachers, a portal for children, instructional reading books, and an online practice resource for social work practitioners to support the early identification of co-existing human victimisation and animal cruelty, and to address the enduring social and emotional impact of animal cruelty on children and adults.

SPCA helps protect over 35, 000 sick, injured, abused and/or abandoned animals in New Zealand every year. It is the only charity with the legal powers to bring animal offenders to justice and help animals in need. SPCA Inspectors are appointed under the Animal Welfare Act 1999, which provides powers to investigate abuse, cruelty, neglect and abandonment.

== See also ==
- RSPCA Australia
- Animal welfare in New Zealand
- Regulation of animal research in New Zealand
