= SAFE (New Zealand organisation) =

New Zealand animal rights advocacy group

SAFE (Save Animals From Exploitation) is a New Zealand animal rights group, with a vision to create an ethical New Zealand that ensures the rights of animals. Its purpose is to educate, inform and empower people to make cruelty-free, plant-based and vegan choices.

== History ==
SAFE evolved out of an Auckland branch of the British Union for the Abolition of Vivisection. This group was renamed Save Animals from Experiments in 1972 and was renamed again to Save Animals from Exploitation in 1987. The organisation is now known as SAFE, and it is a registered charity and an incorporated society.

== Structure ==
The organisation has annual and lifetime members and is governed by a Board of Directors. It has approximately 20 staff and 2,000 volunteers. There are SAFE offices in Wellington, Christchurch and Auckland. As SAFE is a charity, it is entirely dependent on donations from its supporters.

== Politics ==
SAFE has received support from Auckland mayors John Banks and Mike King, former politician Tim Barnett, actress Robyn Malcolm, Gareth Hughes and Sue Kedgely from the Green Party. Leading up to the 2008 General Election, SAFE's Animal Welfare Policy Survey 2008 rated the country's political parties' animal welfare policies. SAFE Ambassador Hans Kriek declared that "the Green Party was a shining light having by far the best and most comprehensive animal welfare policy of any party in New Zealand." Ratings higher than 0 out of 10 were also given to United Future, the Māori Party and the National Party. This could be construed as an endorsement of the Green Party.

== Dairy industry campaigns ==
In 2015, SAFE released footage that was secretly filmed of workers in the winters of 2014 and 2015 abusing calves. One video showed truck drivers throwing calves roughly into a truck, while another showed a slaughterhouse worker kicking and beating calves before clubbing them to death. A number of workers were subsequently fired, with the slaughterhouse owner claiming that she wasn't informed of the abuse earlier. Following the airing of the videos on TV, SAFE supporters protested outside Fonterra's headquarters in Hamilton and SAFE . The slaughterhouse closed after being investigated by the Ministry of Primary Industries and the worker responsible for the abuse was sentenced to home detention.

Shortly after the release of the video, SAFE ran an ad in The Guardian's Saturday edition, saying New Zealand dairy was "contaminated with cruelty". The ad read: "In New Zealand millions of newborn calves are taken from their mothers so that people can drink milk meant for them". The president of Federated Farmers responded saying that separating cows from calves "is simply the reality of dairy farming". New Zealand prime minister, John Key, said running the ad in Britain was "a form of economic sabotage".

== See also ==
- Animal welfare in New Zealand
- Agriculture in New Zealand
- Intensive pig farming
- List of animal rights groups
