= Animal Welfare Act 1999 =

Act of Parliament in New Zealand

New Zealand Parliament
- Long title: (a) to reform the law relating to the welfare of animals and the prevention of their ill-treatment; and, in particular,— (i) to require owners of animals, and persons in charge of animals, to attend properly to the welfare of those animals: (ii) to specify conduct that is or is not permissible in relation to any animal or class of animals: (iii) to provide a process for approving the use of animals in research, testing, and teaching: (iv) to establish a National Animal Welfare Advisory Committee and a National Animal Ethics Advisory Committee: (v) to provide for the development and issue of codes of welfare and the approval of codes of ethical conduct: (b) to repeal the Animals Protection Act 1960
- Passed: 1999
- Royal assent: 14 October 1999
- Commenced: 1 January 2000

Repeals
- Animals Protection Act 1960

Amended by
- Animal Welfare Amendment Act 2010

Related legislation
- Search and Surveillance Act 2012
- Status: Current legislation

The Animal Welfare Act 1999 is a current Act of Parliament in New Zealand. It is administered by the Ministry for Primary Industries.

== See also ==
- Animal welfare in New Zealand
- Agriculture in New Zealand
