= Biosecurity Act 1993 =

Act of Parliament in New Zealand

Biosecurity Act

New Zealand Parliament
- Long title: An Act to restate and reform the law relating to the exclusion, eradication, and effective management of pests and unwanted organisms
- Passed: 1993
- Royal assent: 26 August 1993
- Commenced: 1 October 1993
- Administered by: Ministry for Primary Industries

Amended by
- Biosecurity Amendment Act (No 2) 2008
- Status: Current legislation

Biosecurity Act 1993 is an Act of Parliament in New Zealand. The Act is a restatement and reform of the laws relating to pests and other unwanted organisms. It was a world first.

In the Act an "unwanted organism" is defined as one that "is capable or potentially capable of causing unwanted harm to any natural and physical resources or human health" and a "restricted organism" means "any organism for which a containment approval has been granted in accordance with the Hazardous Substances and New Organisms Act 1996".

Part 5 of the Act provides for national pest management plans and regional pest management plans.

== See also ==
- Biosecurity in New Zealand
- Biodiversity of New Zealand
- Conservation in New Zealand
- Environment Act 1986
- Ministry for the Environment (New Zealand)
- National Pest Plant Accord
