= Pesticide residues in New Zealand =

Pesticide residues are of concern in New Zealand and foods are regularly checked to see if they are within set limits.

Food Standards Australia New Zealand develops the standards for levels of pesticide residues in foods through a consultation process and the New Zealand Food Safety Authority publishes the maximum limits of pesticide residues for foods produced in New Zealand.

Pesticide residues tested in 1997 were generally low and thought to pose no detectable threat to health. More recent research shows a link between pesticides and Parkinson's disease, and on the foetus.

The Soil & Health Association of New Zealand and the Pesticide Action Network Aotearoa New Zealand claim that the 2010 results are the worst ever. Some of the results include:

- Pesticide residues found in 94% of targeted fruit and vegetable samples
- Prohibited endosulfan in 11 of 23 cucumber samples
- Dangerous fungicide exceeding allowable levels in 9 out of 24 Pak choi samples
- 18 different pesticides found among 24 grape samples

The Green Party would prefer to see the precautionary principle used for potentially hazardous chemicals, as practised in the European Union.

== See also ==
- Pesticides in New Zealand
- DDT in New Zealand
- Food safety in New Zealand
- Environment of New Zealand
- Agriculture in New Zealand
