= Organic farming in New Zealand =

Farming organically in New Zealand

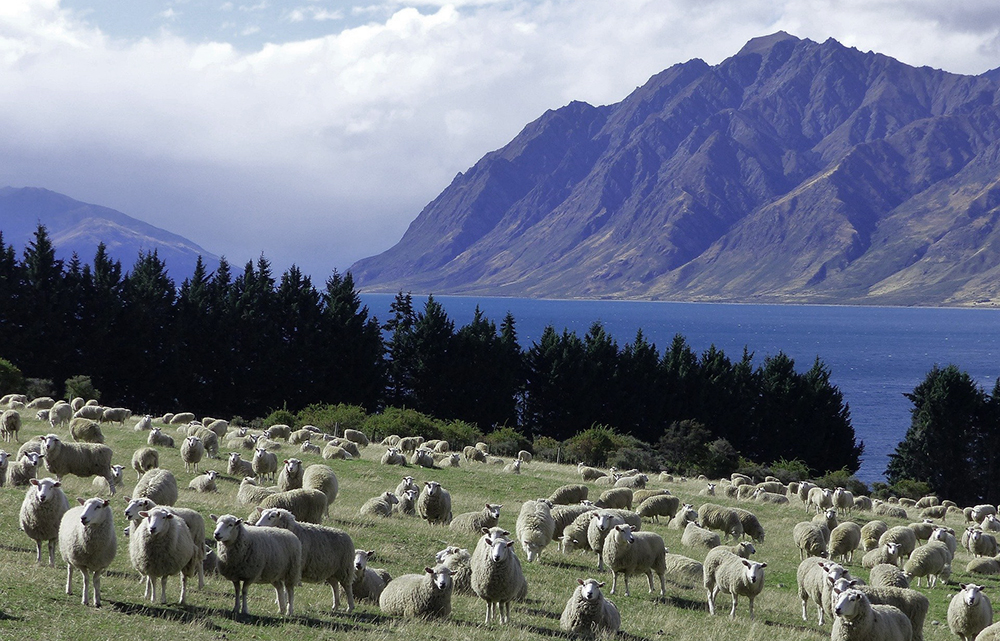
Queenstown Sheep Farm

Organic farming in New Zealand has developed from early biodynamic and organic farming movements dating from the 1930s. Commercial organic production and certification developed further during the 1970s and 1980s. BioGro, New Zealand's first organic certification organisation, was established in 1983.

New Zealand's organic sector includes horticulture, dairy, wine, livestock, processed food and other primary products. In 2024, the sector was valued at approximately NZ$1.18 billion, comprising NZ$606.7 million in exports and an estimated NZ$572 million in domestic consumption. Approximately 89,544 hectares of land was certified organic, representing around 0.6% of New Zealand farmland.

Organic production in New Zealand is transitioning to a national regulatory system under the Organic Products and Production Act 2023. The Act received Royal assent on 5 April 2023. The Organic Products and Production Regulations 2025 came into force on 3 October 2025, while the national organic standards are scheduled to become mandatory from 31 March 2028.

== Organic production in New Zealand ==
Organic production in New Zealand spans a range of primary sectors, including horticulture and cropping, dairy, sheep and beef farming, viticulture, aquaculture and other livestock production. Organic standards also cover beekeeping and the production and processing of organic food and beverages.

Horticulture, dairy and wine are particularly important to New Zealand's organic export sector. In 2024, fruit and vegetables accounted for 40.3% of organic exports by value, followed by dairy at 35.3% and wine at 12.2%.

Certified organic production covered approximately 89,544 hectares in 2024. Of this, approximately 60,275 hectares was used for livestock production, 25,719 hectares for horticulture and cropping, and 3,016 hectares for viticulture.

== Government regulation and policy ==
For much of its history, organic production in New Zealand operated without a single national organic standard. Organic certification was instead provided through private certification schemes, while organic exports were also subject to requirements administered by the Ministry for Primary Industries (MPI).

A national regulatory framework for organic products was established through the Organic Products and Production Act 2023, which received Royal assent on 5 April 2023. The legislation provides a framework for regulating products described as organic, including requirements for organic operators, recognised entities, imports and exports, verification, enforcement and the use of organic standards.

The Organic Products and Production Regulations 2025 came into force on 3 October 2025. The Organic Standards Regulations 2025 establish national requirements for organic production and processing and are scheduled to come into force on 31 March 2028.

The regulatory framework provides for the approval of organic operators and recognition of entities involved in assessment and verification. It also establishes requirements relating to traceability and recall, imports and exports, official assurances, compliance and enforcement.

The transition to the national system is being implemented progressively. MPI is responsible for administering the legislation and has undertaken consultations on regulations, organic standards, recognised entities, verification, evaluation, inputs and cost recovery as the new regulatory system is developed.

Organic farming is also affected by wider environmental and agricultural policy in New Zealand, including policies relating to freshwater quality, climate change, agricultural emissions, soil management and biodiversity. These policies apply across the agricultural sector and are not specific to organic production.

== Organic farming practices ==
Organic farming in New Zealand uses production methods intended to maintain soil health, conserve natural resources, support biodiversity and reduce reliance on external inputs. Organic production generally restricts the use of synthetic fertilisers and pesticides, genetic modification and other specified production methods.

Under New Zealand's Organic Standards Regulations 2025, the principles of organic production recognise the importance of healthy soil and water, biodiversity, pollinating insects, animal welfare and the ecological balance of the production environment. The standards emphasise conservation of natural resources, efficient use and recycling of nutrients and water, and production systems that minimise reliance on external inputs and non-renewable resources.

Soil management is a central component of organic production. The standards require organic operators to use production methods that, as far as practicable, minimise soil erosion, loss of topsoil, soil compaction and salination. Operators must monitor soil health, fertility and biological activity, protect and enhance soil fertility, maintain plant diversity and undertake crop rotation where relevant to the type of production.

Organic production also uses preventative approaches to the management of pests, weeds and diseases. The regulatory framework places emphasis on production practices that minimise negative effects on ecological systems, while requirements relating to environmentally sensitive areas, biodiversity, responsible water use and the management of waste and by-products form part of the national organic standards.

Composting and other permitted organic inputs may be used to support soil fertility. The standards include specific requirements for materials used to make compost and regulate the inputs that may be used in organic production.

== Economic impacts and challenges ==
Organic production can provide New Zealand farmers and growers with access to premium domestic and international markets. New Zealand's organic sector was valued at approximately NZ$1.18 billion in 2024, including NZ$606.7 million in exports. The value of the sector increased by 37% between 2020 and 2024, excluding foodservice, while organic exports grew by approximately 45% over the same period.

Demand for certified organic products can enable producers to access markets where organic products command price premiums. Organic production is established in several of New Zealand's major export sectors, particularly fruit and vegetables, dairy and wine. In 2024, these categories accounted for 40.3%, 35.3% and 12.2% respectively of New Zealand's organic exports by value.

Transitioning to and maintaining organic production can also involve additional costs and operational requirements. Producers may need to modify production systems, record keeping, input management and traceability processes and meet requirements for assessment and verification. Certification and regulatory costs can be proportionately more significant for smaller producers.

New Zealand's developing national organic regulatory system includes measures intended to reduce compliance costs for some operators. The Organic Products and Production Regulations 2025 provide for group schemes that can allow eligible businesses to share verification costs, flexibility in the frequency of some on-site checks, and exemptions from the operator approval process for some businesses with annual organic turnover below NZ$10,000.

Market access is particularly important for organic exporters because organic products must meet the requirements of destination markets as well as applicable New Zealand requirements. Differences between certification and regulatory systems can create additional compliance requirements for exporters. Organics Aotearoa New Zealand has identified the development of equivalence arrangements with major overseas organic markets as an important issue for the sector.

== Certification ==
The BioGro logo.

Organic certification in New Zealand has historically been provided through independent certification organisations and standards. BioGro, New Zealand's first organic certification organisation, was established in 1983.

Certification has been particularly important for producers and processors supplying export markets, where products may be required to comply with the organic requirements of the destination country. New Zealand organic certification organisations have therefore operated certification programmes covering domestic and international market requirements.

BioGro provides organic certification for producers, processors and other operators in New Zealand and internationally. Its certification activities include programmes supporting access to a range of overseas markets, alongside certification to private organic standards.

New Zealand's certification framework is transitioning following the enactment of the Organic Products and Production Act 2023. The Act establishes a statutory system for the approval of organic operators and the recognition of entities carrying out functions under the national organic regulatory system.

The Organic Notice: Recognised Entities, Verification and Evaluation 2026 came into force on 2 June 2026. It establishes requirements for recognised entities, including requirements relating to recognition, accreditation, verification, evaluation, quality management systems, competency and record keeping.

Under the new regulatory system, operators whose products are covered by the national organic standards will generally be required to obtain approval and comply with applicable verification, traceability and record-keeping requirements. The Act also provides for a public register of approved operators and recognised entities. The national Organic Standards Regulations are scheduled to come into force on 31 March 2028.

== Organisations ==
A number of organisations have contributed to the development, certification and representation of organic agriculture in New Zealand.

The Bio Dynamic Farming and Gardening Association in New Zealand, now known as Biodynamics New Zealand, was formally established in 1939 to promote biodynamic approaches to agriculture, horticulture, forestry and animal husbandry. Biodynamic practices had been used in New Zealand from around 1928.

The Soil & Health Association of New Zealand was established in 1941, originally as the Humic Compost Club. It has played a longstanding role in advocating for organic food, farming, soil health and ecological approaches to agriculture in New Zealand.

BioGro New Zealand was established in 1983 as New Zealand's first organic certification organisation. BioGro provides certification services for organic producers, processors and other operators supplying domestic and international markets.

Organics Aotearoa New Zealand (OANZ) was established as an umbrella organisation for New Zealand's organic sector. It represents participants across organic production, processing, certification, distribution and related activities and undertakes sector advocacy, research and industry development.

Organic certification and verification organisations operating in New Zealand include BioGro, AsureQuality, Demeter, OrganicFarmNZ and Hua Parakore. These organisations operate different certification or verification systems and serve different parts of the domestic and export organic sector.

Worldwide Opportunities on Organic Farms (WWOOF) has also operated in New Zealand since the 1970s, connecting volunteers with participating organic farms and other hosts.

== See also ==
- Agriculture in New Zealand
- Environment of New Zealand
