= Hugh Wilson (New Zealand botanist) =

New Zealand botanist

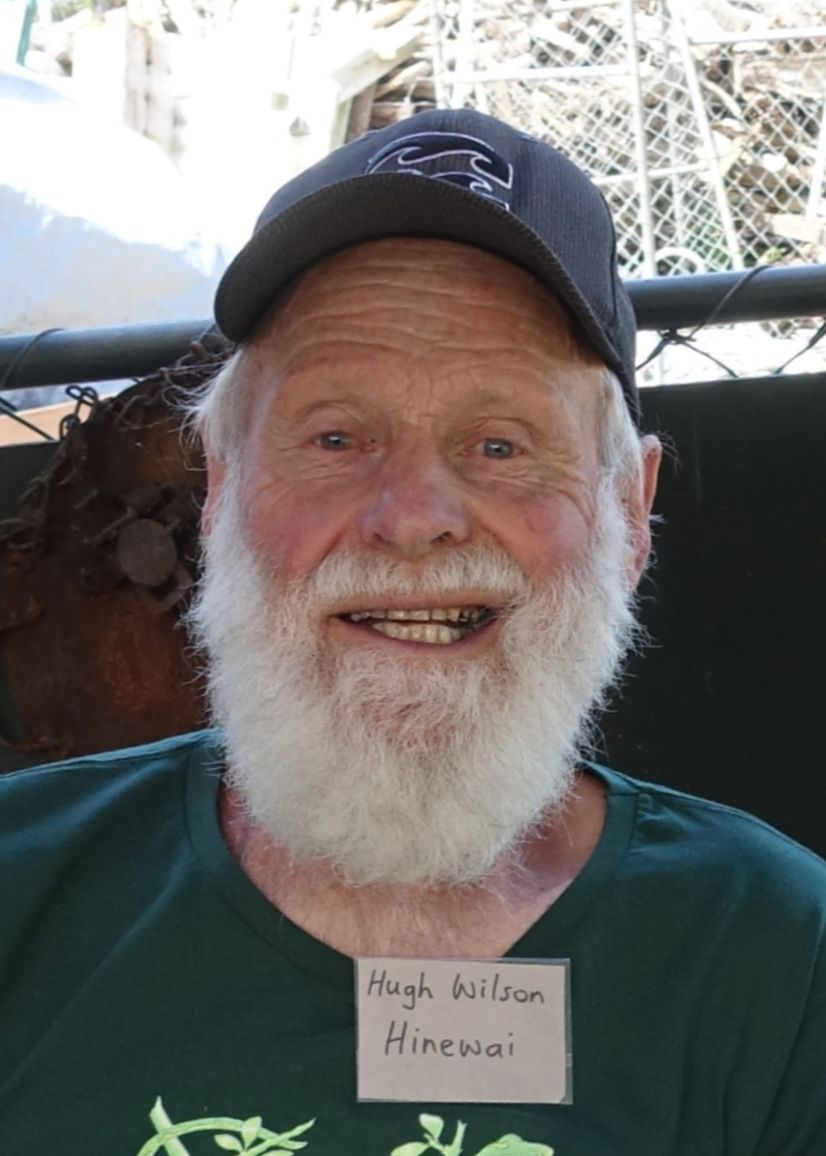
- Hugh Wilson in 2017
- Born: 23 February 1945 (age 81); Timaru, New Zealand
- Citizenship: New Zealand
- Education: University of Canterbury
- Scientific career
- Fields: botanist

Hugh Dale Wilson (born 1945) is a New Zealand botanist. He has written and illustrated a number of books about New Zealand plants, and manages Hinewai Reserve on Banks Peninsula.

== Early life and education ==
Hugh Wilson and his twin sister Hilary were born in Timaru in 1945, two of six children. His parents were both deeply religious, and his father, Malcolm Wilson, was a Presbyterian minister at Knox Church. The family moved to Christchurch in 1950, when Wilson was five years old. His parents were keen on the outdoors and camping and he attributes his love for birds to a family holiday to Stewart Island. Wilson attended Elmwood District (later Normal) School, where he began drawing birds at an early age. Planting New Zealand native plants in his St Albans backyard to attract birdlife sparked his interest in botany, as he found the plants themselves more interesting than birds. He attended St Andrews College, where he was caned for defacing his textbooks with drawings of birds and plants, and was awarded Dux in 1962. After high school, he taught for a year for Voluntary Service Overseas, the British scheme on which Volunteer Service Abroad was later to be based, in Sarawak on Borneo; after visiting the forests of Mount Kinabalu his interest in botany was confirmed.

Wilson returned to study botany, English, and philosophy at the University of Canterbury, where he also from an interest in Māori culture began to learn Te Reo Māori, and graduated in 1968. Afterwards he travelled widely, participating in two mountaineering and scientific expeditions in the Peruvian Andes, lecturing at botanic gardens in North America, and bicycling through Britain and Europe in 1983.

He is suspicious of modern technology, refusing to own a computer, television, digital camera, or mobile phone. His house has a land line telephone but no internet. The newsletter of the Maurice White Native Forest Trust, Pīpipi, is written and illustrated by hand and distributed to 2000 supporters only by paper mail. Wilson has not owned an automobile since the 1970s, preferring to cycle or take public transport, and for years made a seven-hour commute between Christchurch and Hinewai Reserve by bicycle.

== Botanical work ==
Immediately after graduating, Wilson began working part-time for seven years surveying the botany of the Aoraki / Mount Cook region, living at Mount Cook village, and producing a report for the Department of Lands and Survey in 1976 followed by a botanical field guide to the area. He then spent five years on a survey of Stewart Island / Rakiura, again producing a field guide.

The Department of Lands and Survey, later the Department of Conservation (DOC), ran the Protected Natural Areas Programme (PNAP) to identify and protect examples of plant life, animals, ecosystems and landscape features that made New Zealand unique. The PNAP was established in 1983, and the country was divided into 268 ecological districts, grouped into 85 ecological regions. Banks Peninsula was one of those regions, with Port Hills, Herbert and Akaroa making up its three districts.

Wilson started fieldwork on Banks Peninsula and Kaitorete Spit in September 1983, supported by the Koiata Botanical Trust. He established a 1000-yard grid-point system and surveyed a 6 m x 6 m sample plot at each site. That way, 1331 plots were surveyed over a five-year period, requiring permission from more than 500 landowners. Some of the plots were on the face of cliffs that necessitated Wilson being lowered by ropes, and others at the foot of sea cliffs could only be reached by boat. DOC realised Wilson's survey was directly relevant to their aims, and asked him to write the Banks Peninsula PNAP report. The report was the 21st in the series and published in 1992. Wilson noticed that although Banks Peninsula had been almost completely deforested (by 1900, all but 1 per cent of its forest cover had been cleared for farming and timber), there were still isolated remnants of old-growth native bush.

In 1987 the Canterbury Botanical Society received a legacy from an anonymous donor, to be used to fund a research botanist working neither for academia nor the government. Wilson was the first recipient of the Koiata Botanical Trust's funding, and spent six years preparing a field guide to over 230 species of small-leaved shrubs of New Zealand. The book, completed in 1993, was illustrated by Tim Galloway and published by Manuka Press of Christchurch, which went on to republish Wilson's other field guides.

== Hinewai ==
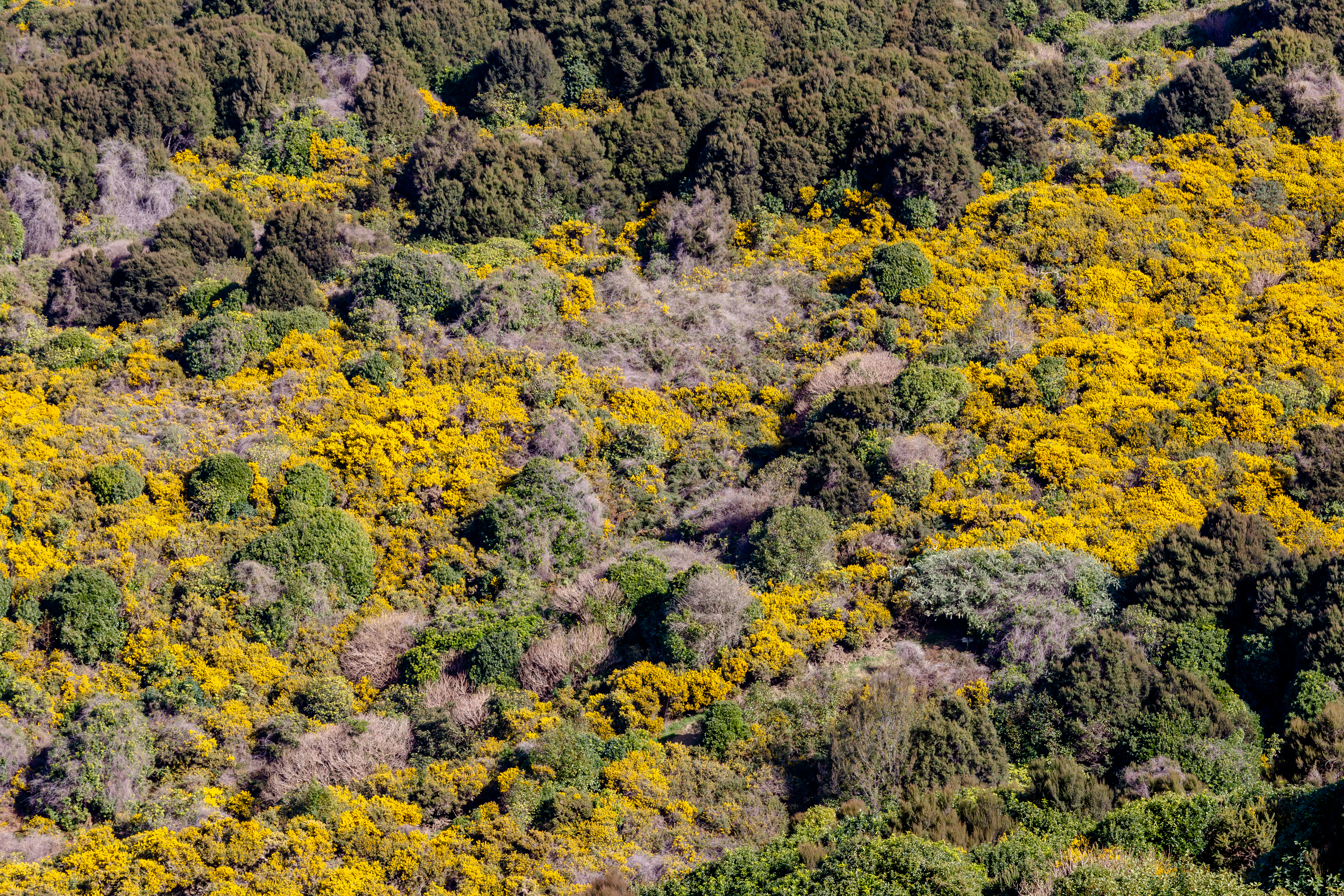
Native forest regenerating through gorse, Hinewai Reserve

In 1986 at a Forest & Bird meeting in Christchurch Wilson met businessman Maurice White. Since 1977 White and his colleague Colin Averill had been building a charitable trust fund to buy land for conservation purposes on Banks Peninsula. White asked if Wilson had come across land suitable for the trust's aims during his PNAP survey. On Wilson's recommendation, the Maurice White Native Forest Trust in September 1987 bought a 109 ha block of hilly marginal farmland east of Akaroa, which became Hinewai Reserve, a private nature reserve, and appointed Wilson as manager. Wilson's survey work at Hinewai was funded from 1989 by the Koiata Trust.

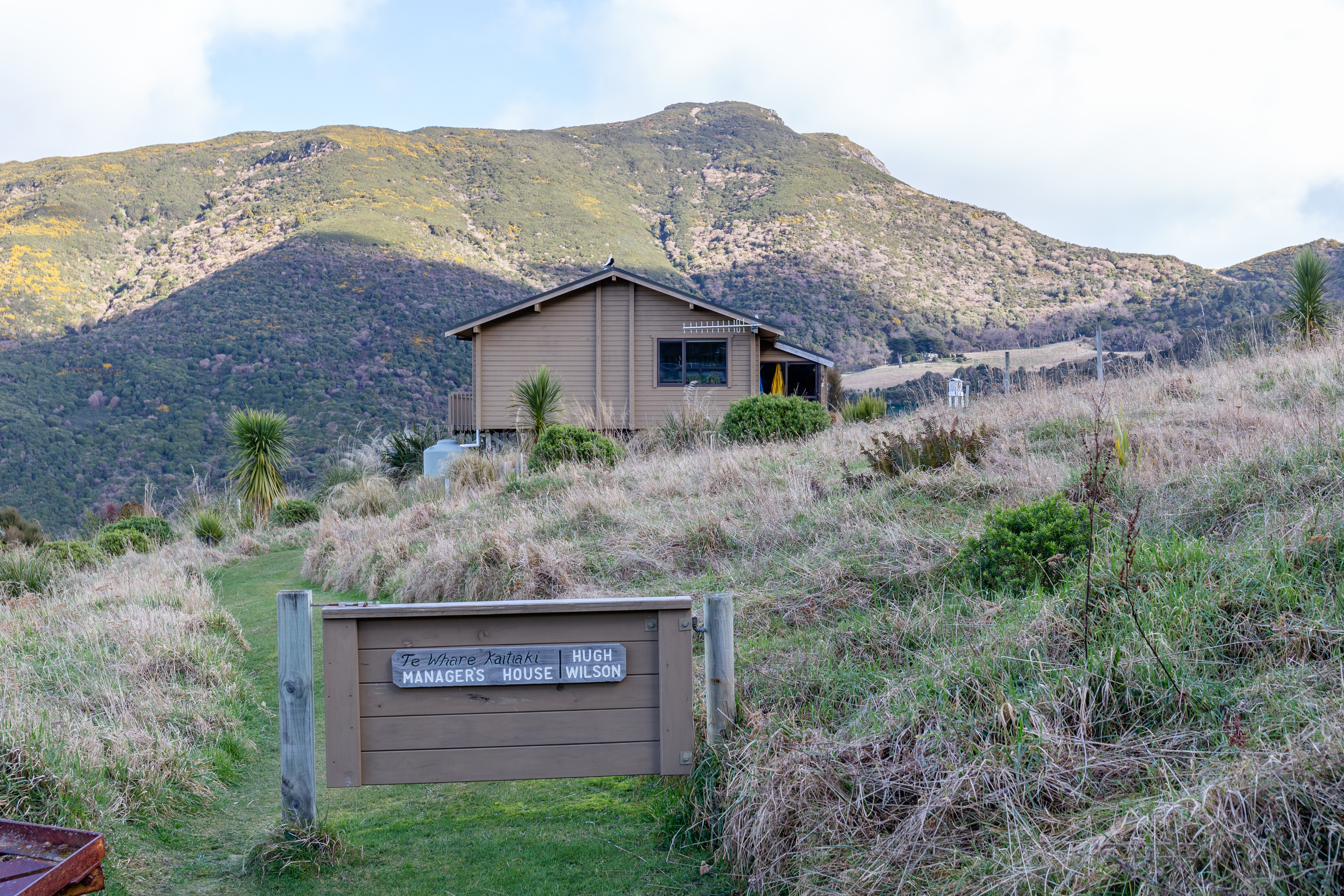
Manager's house, Hinewai Reserve

WIlson's management method recognised that introduced gorse, which most local farmers tried to remove from their pasture, would act as a shelter and nursery crop for native vegetation. Rather than undertake tree planting programmes, native trees would of their own accord grow through this gorse canopy and shade out the light-demanding gorse, eventually killing it and replacing it with a forest canopy. Wilson was met with skepticism by neighbouring farmers, one of whom wrote in a letter to the Akaroa Mail, "heaven help us from fools and dreamers". Local government regulations required him to keep clearing gorse from pasture and from the edges of the property, but eventually forest regeneration began, vindicating his approach.

In 1991 the Maurice White Trust bought 870 ha of Otanerito Station next to the reserve, and Hinewai eventually grew to 1250 ha of gorse and regenerating native bush. As of 2026, the reserve encompasses around 1700 ha, including the neighbouring Purple Peak Curry Reserve which it administers. Since its founding Wilson has been Hinewai's kaitiaki (caretaker), for several years commuting 90 km by bicycle from his home in Christchurch and back every 10 days, but later living in a solar-powered cabin on the property.

== In media ==
Wilson is featured in the 2009 documentary film Earth Whisperers/Papatuanuku. In 2010, he was interviewed for the feature-length documentary film Queen of the Sun. Wilson was the subject of the 2019 short documentary film Fools and Dreamers: Regenerating a Native Forest, by Jordan Osmond and Antoinette Wilson.

== Honours and awards ==
In 1987 Wilson was awarded the Loder Cup for his research on the flora of New Zealand. In 1991 the Linnean Society of London presented him with the H. H. Bloomer Award for his contributions to botany; he was the first biologist in the southern hemisphere to receive the award. The Christchurch Press ranked him among the South Island's most influential figures.

== Selected publications ==
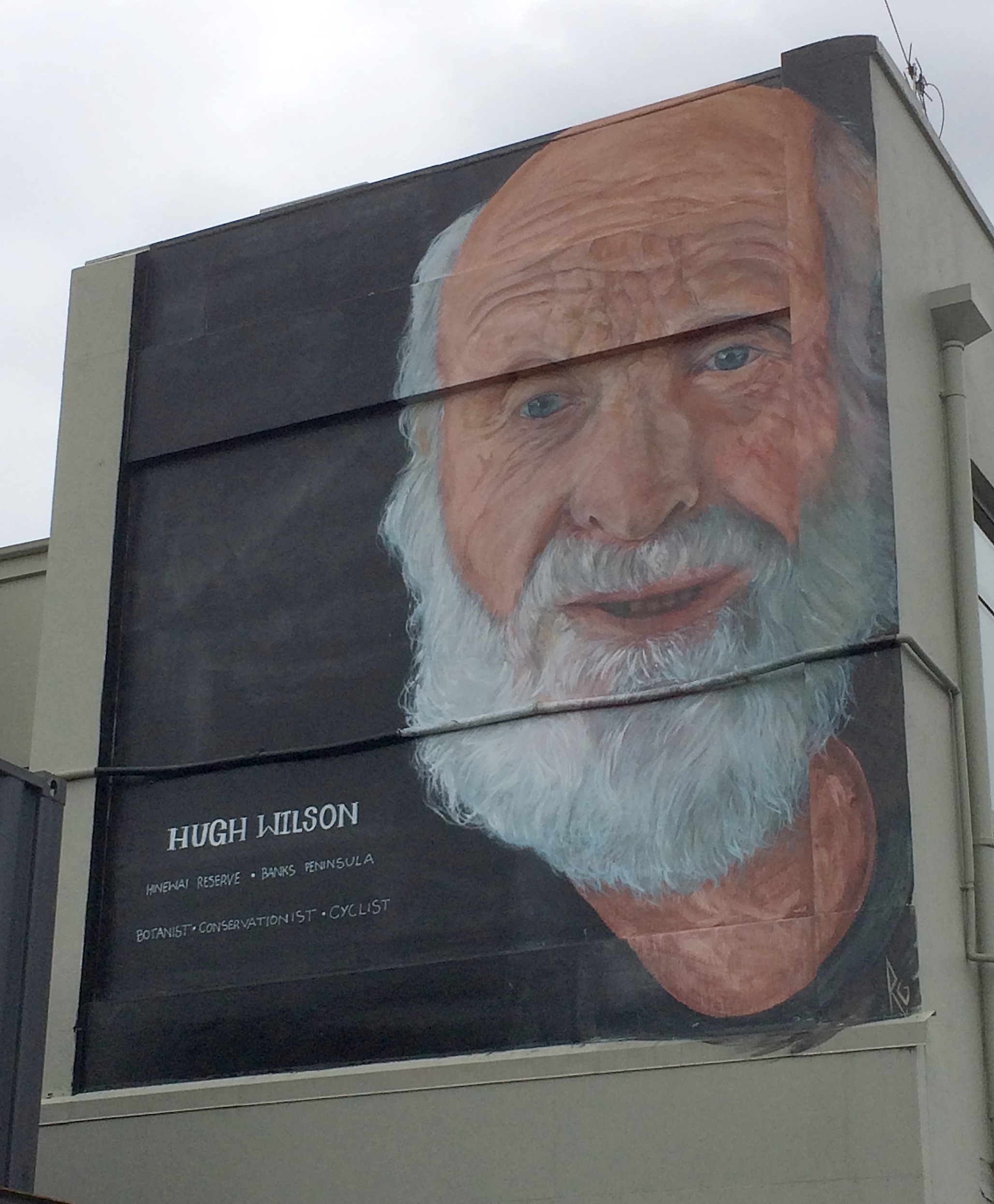
Painting of Wilson in Christchurch's Re:START mall

=== Books ===
- The year of the hornbill : a volunteer’s service in Sarawak. Wellington: A.H. and A. W. Reed, 1966.
- Wildflowers of New Zealand. Christchurch: Bascands Ltd, 1974.
- Vegetation of Mount Cook National Park, New Zealand. Wellington: Department of Lands and Survey, 1976. ISBN 0-477-06100-1
- Field guide : Wild Plants of Mount Cook National Park. Christchurch: Field Guide Publications, 1978 (second edition Christchurch: Manuka Press, 1996).
- Field guide : Stewart Island Plants. Christchurch: Field Guide Publications, 1982 (revised 1994 edition Christchurch: Manuka Press). ISBN 0-9583299-0-7
- Vegetation of Stewart Island, New Zealand. Supplement to the New Zealand Journal of Botany 25:1–131 (1987)
- Banks Ecological Region: Port Hills, Herbert and Akaroa Ecological Districts. Protected Natural Areas Programme Survey Report No. 21. Christchurch: Department of Conservation, 1993. ISBN 0-478-01394-9
- Small-leaved Shrubs of New Zealand. Christchurch: Manuka Press, 1993. Illustrated by Tim Galloway. ISBN 0-473-01851-9
- Naturalised vascular plants on Banks Peninsula. Christchurch: Canterbury Botanical Society special publication, 1999. ISBN 0-473-05826-X
- Hinewai : the journal of a New Zealand naturalist. Christchurch: Shoal Bay Press, 2002. ISBN 978-1-877251-20-7
- Food for tūī on Banks Peninsula : a botanical assessment. Christchurch: Dept. of Conservation, 2007. ISBN 978-0-478-22677-5
- Banks Peninsula Track : a guide to the route, natural features and human history. Christchurch: Manuka Press, 1990 (10th edition 2008).
- Natural History of Banks Peninsula. Christchurch: Canterbury University Press, 2009 (revised 2013). ISBN 978-1-877257-82-7
- Plant Life on Banks Peninsula. Cromwell: Manuka Press, 2013. ISBN 978-0-9583299-6-5
- Hinewai Reflections (drawings and paintings). Christchurch: Quentin Wilson, 2026. ISBN 978-1-991-10393-2

=== Articles ===
- Wilson, Hugh D. and Melissa A.S. Hutchison. (2023). "Colobanthus on Banks Peninsula: a case of less than perfect flowers or less than perfect botanists?" Canterbury Botanical Society Journal. 54: 55–61
- Wilson, Hugh D. (2001). "Coprosma on Banks Peninsula". Canterbury Botanical Society Journal. 41: 53–63.
- Wilson, Hugh D. (2001). "Rare Plants and Banks Peninsula". Canterbury Botanical Society Journal. 35: 21–31.
- Wilson, Hugh D. (1996). "Mistletoes on Banks Peninsula". Canterbury Botanical Society Journal. 31: 14–24.
- McGlone, Matt S. and Hugh D. WIlson. (1996). "Holocene vegetation and climate of Stewart Island, New Zealand". New Zealand Journal of Botany. 34(3): 369–388
- Wilson, Hugh D. (1995). "Highest of all". Quarterly Bulletin of the Alpine Garden Society of the United Kingdom. 63: 260–267.
- Wilson, Hugh D. (1994). "Regeneration of native forest on Hinewai Reserve, Banks Peninsula". New Zealand Journal of Botany. 32: 373–383.
- Wilson, Hugh D and P.J. Garnock-Jones. (1992). "Two new species names in Olearia (Asteraceae) from New Zealand". New Zealand Journal of Botany 30: 365–368.
- Wilson, Hugh D. (1991). "Distribution maps of small-leaved shrubs in Canterbury and Westland". Canterbury Botanical Society Journal. 25: 3–81.
- Wilson, Hugh D. (1990). "The botany of Otanerito Station, Banks Peninsula". Canterbury Botanical Society Journal. 24: 14–26.
- Wilson, Hugh D. (1988). "The botany of Hinewai Reserve". Canterbury Botanical Society Journal. 22: 18–30.
- Wilson, Hugh D. (1985). "Highlights in a botanical study of Banks Peninsula". Canterbury Botanical Society Journal. 19: 9–12.
- Wilson, Hugh D and P.J. Garnock-Jones. (1983). "Taxonomic notes on Stewart Island Ranunculus including two new species". New Zealand Journal of Botany. 21: 341–345.
