= Federated Farmers =

New Zealand farmers advocacy organisation

- Predecessor: New Zealand Farmers Union
- Formation: 30 November 1944; 81 years ago
- Type: Non-governmental organisation
- Headquarters: Wellington
- National President: Wayne Langford
- Key people: Terry Copeland, Chief Executive
- Website: www.fedfarm.org.nz

Federated Farmers of New Zealand is a lobby and advocacy group for farmers and rural communities. It has a network of 24 regional organisations and six industry groups. Federated Farmers lobbies on farming issues both nationally and within each region. Membership of the organisation is voluntary, and at 2021 it has over 13,000 members.

== History ==
Federated Farmers was originally incorporated in 1902 as the New Zealand Farmers Union. In 1944, a joint initiative by the New Zealand Farmers Union and the New Zealand Sheepowners' Federation led to the formation of Federated Farmers, and a new incorporated society, Federated Farmers of New Zealand Inc was registered on 30 November 1944. There were 43,000 members of Federated Farmers in 1971.

== Structure and membership ==
The organisation is a federation of 24 independent regional bodies (provinces) that are separate incorporated societies.

As of 2021, there were 13,000 members of Federated Farmers.

The parent body has 11 offices around the country, and employs 60 staff. In addition to the regional member organisations, Federated Farmers has six industry groups: Arable, Dairy, Goats, High country, Meat & wool and Rural butchers.

The organisation has recently introduced a discounted membership category for owners of lifestyle farm blocks.

=== Publications ===
Federated Farmers has several publications including a weekly newsletter called Friday Flash, which has 11,000 subscribers as of 2021. Other publications include the National Farming Review and Tussock Talk.

During the 2020 New Zealand general election, Federated Farmer released a manifesto.

== Advocacy work ==
=== Animal identification and tracing ===
In 2009, Federated Farmers opposed the Government's new National Animal Identification and Tracing (NAIT) scheme, claiming that it would impose extra costs on farmers which outweighed the benefits. Farmers also feared that the NAIT scheme would be used to impose a greenhouse gas emissions tax under an emissions trading scheme. A Federated Farmers survey found that 2% supported NAIT and 80% opposed it.

In November 2019, Federated Farmers meat and wool chairman Miles Anderson welcomed amendments to the national animal identification and tracing legislation and thanked the Primary Production Select Committee for listening to representations from Federated Farmers and other parties. In mid–May 2021, the group welcomed the 2021 New Zealand budget's allocation of $22 million in funding to the NAIT scheme, streamlining farm planning, and agricultural emissions research.

=== Climate change ===
By 2003, research into greenhouse gas emissions in New Zealand had indicated that approximately half of total emissions were attributable to agriculture - mostly methane and nitrous oxide. However, in 2003 Federated Farmers became involved in a lobbying campaign to oppose the Government's proposal to introduce an Agricultural emissions research levy. The levy was proposed to collect revenue from livestock farmers to fund research into agricultural emissions of greenhouse gases such as methane. Federated Farmers strongly opposed the plan and mocked the idea, calling it a "fart tax". The proposed levy was not implemented, but the following year, a memorandum of understanding was agreed between the Crown and a consortium of agriculture-based companies to pay for an unspecified portion of the costs of the Pastoral Greenhouse Gas Research Consortium.

In 2014, it was reported that Federated Farmers had been forced to state that they had no position on whether climate change is even real, to appease members who denied that climate change was occurring.

In January 2020, Federated Farmers launched a petition calling for the withdrawal and amendment of a new Ministry of Education teaching resource on climate change. The farming group's climate change spokesperson Andrew Hoggard called for balance in the climate change teaching material, taking issue with idea that eating red meat was damaging to the environment. Federated Farmers also called for more input from farmers in the teaching resource.

=== Electric vehicles ===
In June 2021, Federated Farmers' national president Andrew Hoggard called for the Government's electric car rebate scheme to include a waiver for farmers and tradespersons due to the lack of electric vehicle alternatives for the utes commonly used by these occupations.

=== Live animal exports ===
In March 2026, Federated Farmers' dairy chair Karl Dean expressed disappointment with the Sixth National Government's decision to backtrack on a 2023 campaign promise to reverse the previous Labour Government's ban on live animal exports. He said that it was unlikely that live animal exports would be reinstated and said that it hurt New Zealand's agricultural sector.

== Leadership ==
Presidents include:

The initial term was 4 years from 1 July to 30 June later reduced to 3 years. There have been mid-term resignations.

- B. V. Cooksley (1945–1947)
- William Norman Perry (1947–1952)
- John Andrew (1952–1956)
- Stanley Dixon Reeves (1956– )
- W Malcolm (1961— )
- Eric William McCallum (1963– )
- Peter Sidney Plummer (1966–1970)
- Alexander Campbell Begg (1972)
- William Norman Gough Dunlop (1972– )
- John Thomas Kneebone (1974–1977)
- Allan Frederick Wright (1977–1981)
- Rob Storey (1981–1984)
- Peter Elworthy (1984–1987)
- Brian D. Chamberlin (1987–1990)
- Owen Jennings (1990–1993)
- Graham Robertson (1993–1996)
- Malcolm Bailey (1996–1999)
- Alistair Polson (1999–2002)
- Tom Lambie (2002–2005)
- Charlie Pedersen (2005–2009)
- Don Nicholson – resigned in June 2011 to stand for the ACT party in the general election
- Bruce Wills (2011–2014)
- William Rolleston (2014–2017)
- Katie Milne (2017–2020) – first female president
- Andrew Hoggard (2020–2023)
- Wayne Langford (2023–present)

In 2021 the chief executive is Terry Copeland.

=== Women's division ===
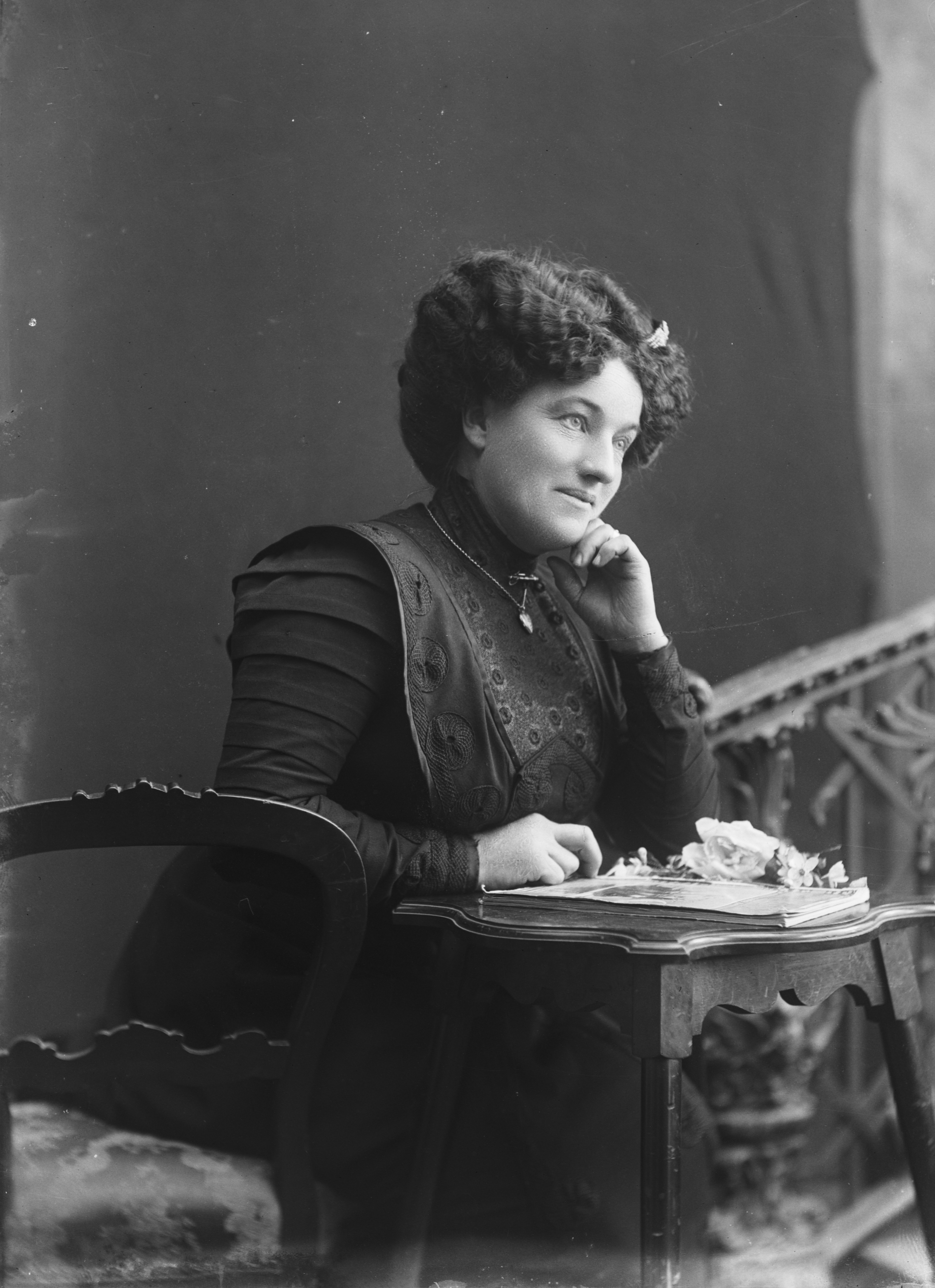
Mrs Polson, founder and guiding force

Formed in 1926 as part of the New Zealand Farmers' Union "to associate farmers' wives and other country women", its name changed to Women's Division of Federated Farmers in 1946 and in 1999 to Rural Women New Zealand.

"In the year to August 2018, for example, parliamentary submissions covered rural environment, health, business, technology, education and social issues, as well as some areas, such as taxation reform, which had once been left to Federated Farmers."

Chairs include:

- Margaret Millard 1999—2001

== See also ==
- Agriculture in New Zealand
- Farmy Army – a volunteer organisation co-ordinated by Federated Farmers
