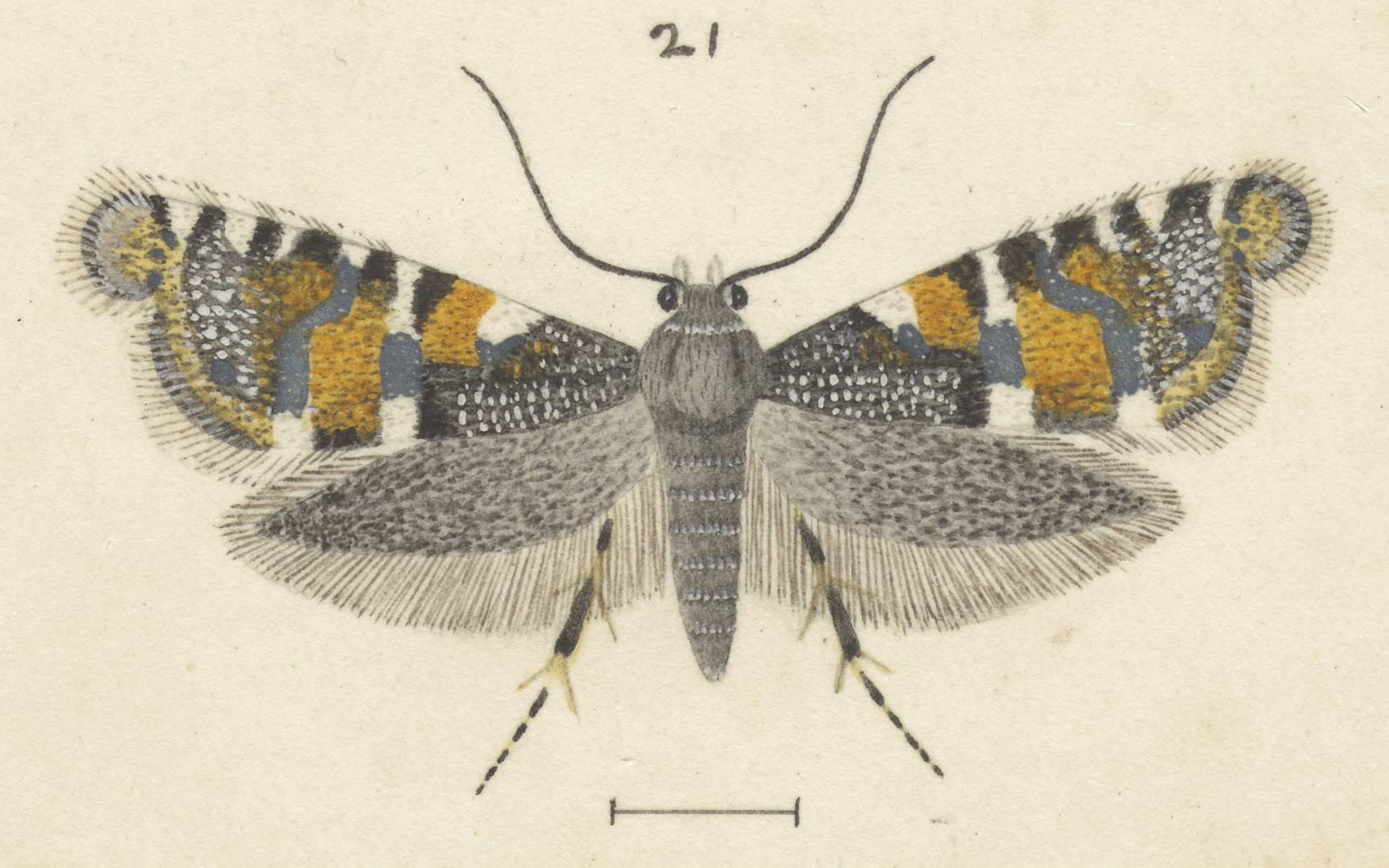
- Illustration of male

Scientific classification
- Kingdom: Animalia
- Phylum: Arthropoda
- Clade: Pancrustacea
- Class: Insecta
- Order: Lepidoptera
- Family: Glyphipterigidae
- Genus: Glyphipterix
- Species: G. euastera

Binomial name
- Glyphipterix euastera Meyrick, 1880

= Glyphipterix euastera =

Species of moth

Glyphipterix euastera is a species of sedge moth in the genus Glyphipterix. It is endemic to New Zealand. This species is classified as "At Risk, Naturally Uncommon" by the Department of Conservation.

== Taxonomy ==
This species was described by Edward Meyrick in 1880 using five specimens taken by him in January on the Lyttelton Hills near Christchurch. George Hudson discussed and illustrated the species in his 1928 book The Butterflies and Moths of New Zealand. The lectotype specimen is held at the Natural History Museum, London.

== Description ==
Meyrick described the species as follows:

♂︎♀︎. 3 1/4"-3 1/2". Head, antennae, and thorax dark fuscous. Palpi whitish at base, second joint with two whorls of dark fuscous white-tipped scales, terminal joint black with two white rings. Abdomen blackish-fuscous, beneath silvery-whitish. Legs dark fuscous, middle and posterior tibiae with white central and apical rings, all tarsi with white rings at apex of joints. Fore-wings elongate, very slightly dilated, hind-margin indented beneath apex; basal and apical thirds dark fuscous, densely strewn with whitish scales, central third bronzy-ferruginous, more or less broadly suffused with dark fuscous on costa and inner margin; a white oblique costal streak at 1/3, reaching middle, ending in a leaden-metallic spot; an indistinct white spot on inner margin near base; two outwardly curved steel-blue metallic fasciae ending in white spots on both margins, first hardly before, second beyond middle; beyond these are three white spots on costa, the first two giving rise to obsolete metallic streaks, the last sub-apical, sending a steel-blue metallic streak to hind-margin below apex; a blackish spot on apex; cilia whitish, fuscous-grey at apex and anal angle, basal half separated by a strong dark fuscous line, and clothed towards base with ferruginous scales, except where a wedge-shaped dark-margined white indentation meets the sub-apical streak. Hind-wings and cilia dark fuscous-grey.

== Distribution ==
This species is endemic to New Zealand. This species occurs in the Mid Canterbury, Central Otago and Otago Lakes areas. Other than the type locality, which is like to be either the Bridle or Rapaki Track, specimens have been collected at Kaitorete Spit, the Hinewai Reserve and near Sutton Lake in Otago. The species also occurs at the north side of Lake Forsyth as well as at Wakanui Beach.

== Biology and behaviour ==
G. euastera is a day-flying moth. This species is on the wing between October and January. It is a leaf mining moth.

== Host plants and habitat ==
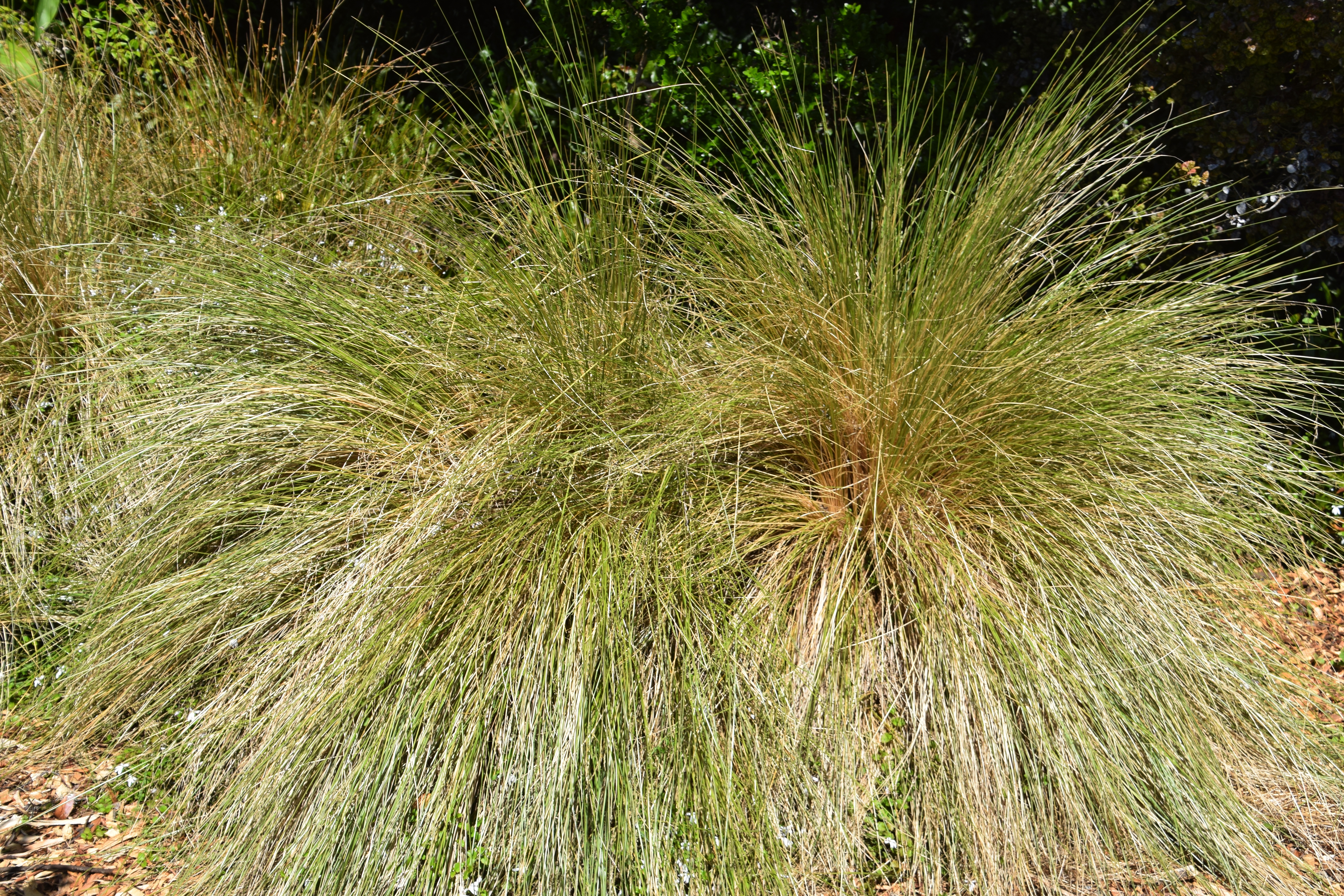
Poa cita

The host species of the larvae of G. euastera is unknown although it is likely that it is a sedge or grass. It is believed that the species is associated with Poa cita (silver tussock). The preferred habitat of this species is short tussock grassland ranging in altitude from sea level to 1,280 metres (4,200 ft).

== Conservation status ==
This species has been classified as having the "At Risk, Naturally Uncommon" conservation status under the New Zealand Threat Classification System. This species is at risk as a result of habitat destruction or modification.
