= Agricultural emissions research levy =

Tax proposal in New Zealand

The agricultural emissions research levy was a controversial tax proposal in New Zealand. It was first proposed in 2003 and would collect an estimated $8.4 million annually from livestock farmers (out of an estimated annual $50–125 million in costs to the public which is caused by farm animals' emissions of greenhouse gases such as methane), and which would have been used to fund research on the livestock industry's emissions of greenhouse gases, to further the nation's compliance with the Kyoto Protocol.

== History ==
In May 2003 a report prepared for the Ministry of Agriculture and Fisheries (O'Hara report) identified that although some funding for agricultural emissions was being provided by FRST and MAF, "The level of investment in abatement research by other public and private sources has been low". The report assessed that a minimum of $4.5 million (optimally $8.4 million) of additional funding would be needed to fund the recommended research program.

In 2003, the tax was opposed by MP's of the ACT Party and the National Party. but eventually they proposed an alternative solution, as described below. Shane Ardern, a National Party MP, drove a tractor up the steps of Parliament as part of a protest against the tax.

In 2004, a consortium of the livestock industry agreed to pay for a portion of this research (just not via taxation), and the government reserved the right to reconsider the tax if they or the industry withdrew from the agreement.

In New Zealand, farm animals account for approximately 50% of the greenhouse gas emissions, according to two official estimates, and the Kyoto treaty may compel New Zealand to pay penalties if gas levels are not brought down. Research shows that the world's livestock produce are a significant contributor to global emissions (NZ exports a significant degree of its dairy and meat, as noted in Economy of New Zealand.)

In 2004, whilst the Labour Party's coalition still led parliament, New Zealand's livestock farmers agreed to contribute to related scientific research, and to fund an unspecified portion of the costs of the Pastoral Greenhouse Gas Research Consortium.

In September 2009, the National-led government announced that a push would be made for the formation of a Global Alliance to investigate methods of reducing greenhouse gas emissions due to agriculture. Simon Upton, a former National Party MP and Minister for the Environment, was appointed as a special envoy to liaise with other countries on the issue.

== Controversy ==
The tax was described by livestock farmers and other critics as a "flatulence tax" or "fart tax" (though these nicknames are misleading, since most ruminant methane production is a product of the burping of methane produced by bacteria in the first stomach (the rumen) rather than of flatulence), and the president of the Federated Farmers contended that the government was trying to make the livestock industry pay for the "largesse" of others.

In contrast, those who endorse such taxes contend that the result is that if one consumes a larger amount of the products which increase healthcare costs (in a system where citizens share each other's medical costs) – or those whose habits damage the environment, or if one's animals require antibiotics constantly to ameliorate disease-prone conditions, antibiotics which breed super-bugs that may also attack humans – then one would merely be paying for their own largesse, and the costs to society that their habits cause (and the opposition argues that one should pay more, commensurately, as one does or consumes more of what harms others in his society) (see also Pigovian tax).

== See also ==
- Climate change in New Zealand
- Agriculture in New Zealand
- Livestock's Long Shadow – Environmental Issues and Options; Climate change and agriculture: livestock
