= Pesticides in New Zealand =

Agricultural pest control in New Zealand

There is a high use of pesticides in New Zealand due predominantly to the large agricultural industry.

== Pesticides ==
=== 1080 ===
Sodium fluoroacetate, commonly known as 1080, is used in New Zealand to control animal pests, specifically the possum which threatens biodiversity and carries tuberculosus. Hunters fear that 1080 impacts on game animals, and some environmentalists have concerns about 1080 killing the very native fauna it is meant to save, and pollution of drinking water reservoirs with 1080 baits and poisoned animals.

=== 2,4,5-T ===
Manufacture of 2,4,5-Trichlorophenoxyacetic acid (2,4,5-T) ceased in New Zealand in 1987 and it is no longer sold in New Zealand.

=== 2,4-D ===
2,4-Dichlorophenoxyacetic acid (2,4-D) is used in New Zealand and the Pesticides Board has decided not to prohibit the use of the chemical.

=== DDT ===
DDT was used extensively for agricultural use in the 1950s and 1960s to control grass grub and porina moth. It was also used on lawns and for market gardens. Some 500 tons was being applied annually by 1959. By the 1970s its use was restricted and it was finally banned in 1989. Residues are still found in livestock and in marine mammals.

=== Endosulfan ===
Use of the plant pesticide endosulfan was banned by the Environmental Risk Management Authority (ERMA) in December 2008, effective from 16 January 2009, after a campaign by environmental groups and the Green Party. Testing as part of the Food Residues Surveillance Programme had detected endosulfan in foods such as lettuce, strawberries and capsicum, but under 0.1 mg/kg. In June 2008 ERMA called for public submissions on the use of endosulfan after tighter controls had been placed on the pesticide in other countries. Submissions closed on 8 September 2008 and a total of 187 submissions were received. The Green Party surveyed the 85 councils in New Zealand and discovered that 18 of them had used endosulfan on sports grounds in the year preceding October 2008. They claimed that New Zealand is the only country to do so and advocated for a ban on its use.

The Auckland City Council had stopped using it in the mid 1990s. The non-approved use of endosulfan on cattle in 2007 had led to the prosecution of a farmer and the suspension of beef exports to Korea.

=== Methyl bromide ===
Methyl bromide is used as a fumigant for whole logs destined for export. There has been lobbying to stop its use due to concerns for human health.

=== Glyphosate ===
In New Zealand, glyphosate is an approved herbicide for killing weeds, with the most popular brand being Roundup. Genetically modified crops designed to resist glyphosate are absent in New Zealand. Crops applied with glyphosate must be regulated under the HSNO Act 1996 and ACVM Act 1997. Legal status for glyphosate use in New Zealand is approved for commercial and personal use. Exports of New Zealand honey have been found in 2021 to contain traces of glyphosate, citing Japan to decline imports of affected New Zealand honey. New Zealand has low regulations for glyphosate, despite other countries imposing restrictions or bans on glyphosate.

== Pesticide residue ==
Pesticide residues are generally low and are thought to pose no detectable threat to health.

== Aerial spraying programmes ==
Aerial spraying of West Auckland areas was carried out by the Ministry of Agriculture and Forestry (MAF) to eliminate the invasive painted apple moth, a potential threat to the environment and economy. Foray 48B was sprayed over populated West Auckland areas for 29 months involving 48 spray events over 70 days. After the Government declined to conduct a public inquiry into the spraying, a "people's inquiry" initiated by a number of academics delivered a report critical of MAF's approach to the issue.

Rural and city areas of Hamilton were sprayed to eradicate the gypsy moth.

== See also ==
- Agriculture in New Zealand
- Environment of New Zealand
- Environmental impact of pesticides
- Gorse in New Zealand
- Pesticide residues in New Zealand
