= Hump and hollow =

Technique of contouring pastures

Hump and hollow, occasionally termed "flipping", is a technique of contouring pastures to improve productivity especially on the West Coast of New Zealand.

The technique, used on peat soils and in areas of high rainfall, allows for faster water runoff and lowers the level the water table. In a three-year trial at Kowhitirangi on the West Coast of New Zealand where the annual rainfall is 3000mm, an improvement of 14% was made when compared with no drainage.

Hump and hollowing is increasingly used on the West Coast and concerns have been raised about the effects on water quality. There is also an effect on soil structure, catchment hydrology, and modifications to habitat.

== See also ==
- Agriculture in New Zealand
