= DDT in New Zealand =

Use of organochloride as an insecticide

The use of DDT in New Zealand was banned in 1989 due to negative environmental impacts.

== DDT ==
DDT is an organochlorine insecticide that does not occur naturally. It is a persistent organic pollutant (POP) with a half life of 2–15 years. Concerns were raised about its use in the 1940s but the publication of Rachael Carson's book Silent Spring was the catalyst leading to DDT being banned. DDT was first banned in Hungary in 1968 then in Norway and Sweden in 1970, the US in 1972 and the United Kingdom in 1984.

== Usage ==
DDT was used extensively for agricultural use in the 1950s and 1960s to control grass grub and porina moth. It was also used on lawns and for market gardens. Some 500 tons was being applied annually by 1959. By the 1970s its use was restricted and was banned in 1989.

== Residues ==
There was increasing evidence, especially in the 1970s, that there were DDT residues in aquatic organisms including trout and eels. Being bioaccumulative DDT passes up the food chain and organisms at higher trophic levels end up with high concentrations of the pesticide.

Some Canterbury and Southland farms have elevated levels of DDT and a programme run by the Ministry of Agriculture ensures that exported meat and dairy produce have low levels of these residues. During dry periods animals ingest soil since grass is shorter and sparser and the DDT residue on the soil is retained by the animal. In the 1980s 40% of the lambs in Canterbury, a region with low rainfall and occasional droughts, had DDT levels that were above the European Union's permitted limit but still acceptable under safe tolerance limits for New Zealand.

Māpua was one of the most contaminated sites in New Zealand due to pesticide residues in the soils from a now defunct factory. In the 1940s organomercury and organochlorine pesticides, including DDT, DDD, dieldrin, 2,4-D and paraquat, were produced. The factory closed in 1988 and the site was subjected to a major cleanup operation in the 2000s.

DDT has also been found in the endangered Hectors dolphin which inhabits the coastal regions on New Zealand.

== Stockholm Convention ==
The New Zealand government has signed and ratified the Stockholm Convention which controls the production and use of persistent organic pesticides, and therefore includes DDT. It came into law on 23 December 2004. Article 3.1(b) of the Convention restricts the production and use of DDT but since there is no intention to use DDT in New Zealand there is no action required under the Convention.

== See also ==
- Pesticides in New Zealand
- Environmental effects of pesticides
