= Hinewai Reserve =

Nature reserve on Banks Peninsula, New Zealand

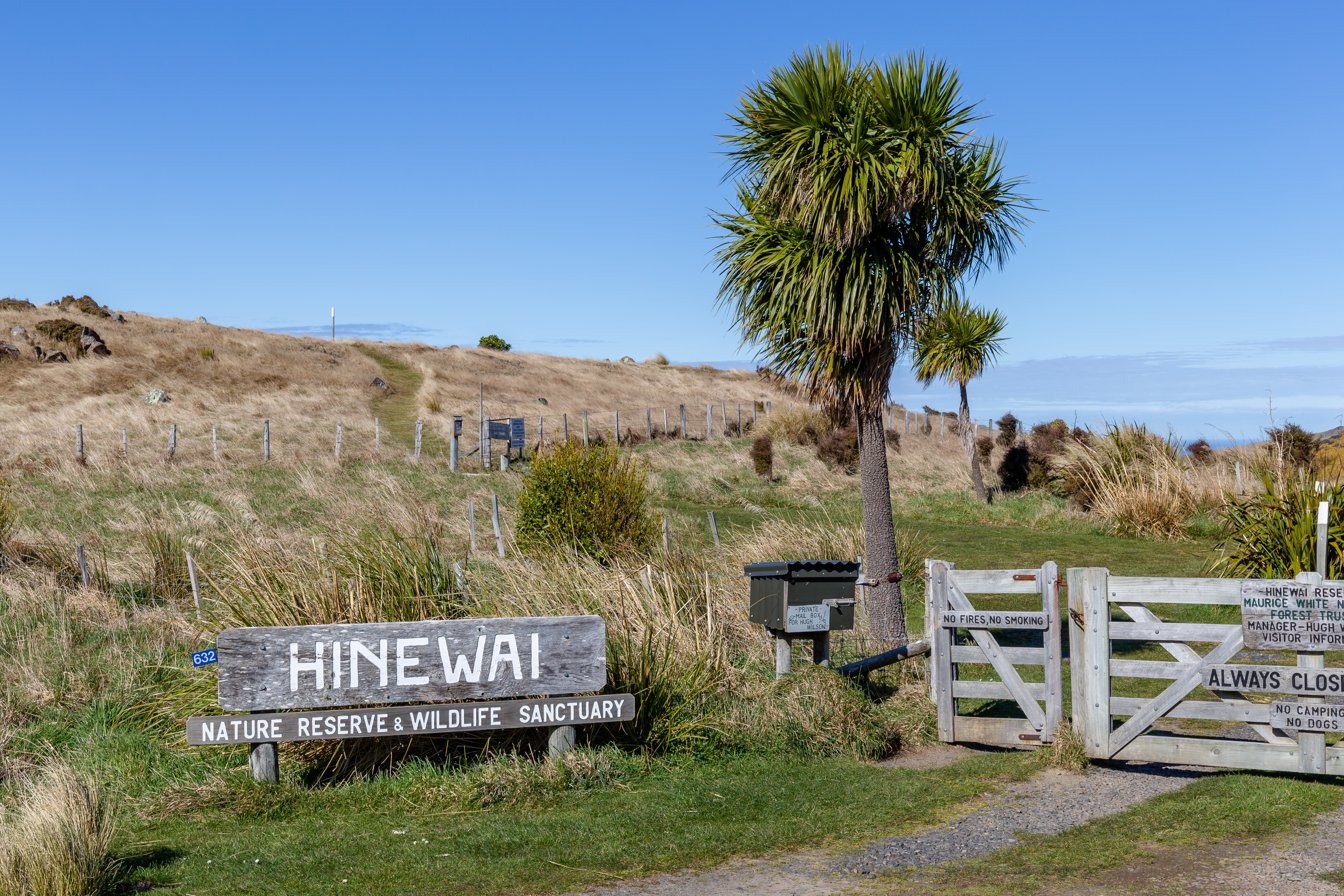
- Hinewai Reserve sign by the main gate
- Interactive map of Hinewai Reserve
- Type: Nature reserve
- Location: Banks Peninsula, New Zealand
- Nearest city: Akaroa
- Coordinates: 43°49′S 173°2′E
- Area: 1,426 ha (3,520 acres)
- Created: September 1987
- Operator: Maurice White Native Forest Trust
- Status: Open to the public
- Designation: Private reserve
- Website: hinewai.org.nz

Hinewai Reserve is a private nature reserve located on Banks Peninsula in the Canterbury Region of New Zealand. It is owned and managed by the Maurice White Native Forest Trust.

== Description ==
The reserve began as a 109-hectare block of farmland purchased in September 1987. It has since expanded to approximately 1,426 ha (3,520 acres), and is now covered with a mix of gorse and regenerating native bush.

The land was originally forested before human settlement, but much of the native vegetation was cleared following European colonisation. The area is now undergoing rapid reforestation, with gorse acting as a nurse crop for regenerating native species.

The reserve features over 20 public walking tracks, including sections of the Banks Peninsula Track.

== Management ==
Botanist Hugh Wilson manages the reserve on behalf of the Trust. He also hand-writes and illustrates the quarterly newsletter Pīpipi, which reports on the reserve’s progress and ecology.

== Events ==
In July 2011, approximately one-third of the reserve was burned in a large fire, likely caused by a lightning strike. By 2017, native vegetation had regrown rapidly, aided by the role of gorse as a pioneer species.

In December 2021, dramatic floods caused widespread landslips across the reserve, reshaping parts of the landscape. Further recovery and growth of gorse and native shrubs was reported in 2024 and 2025.

== Gallery ==
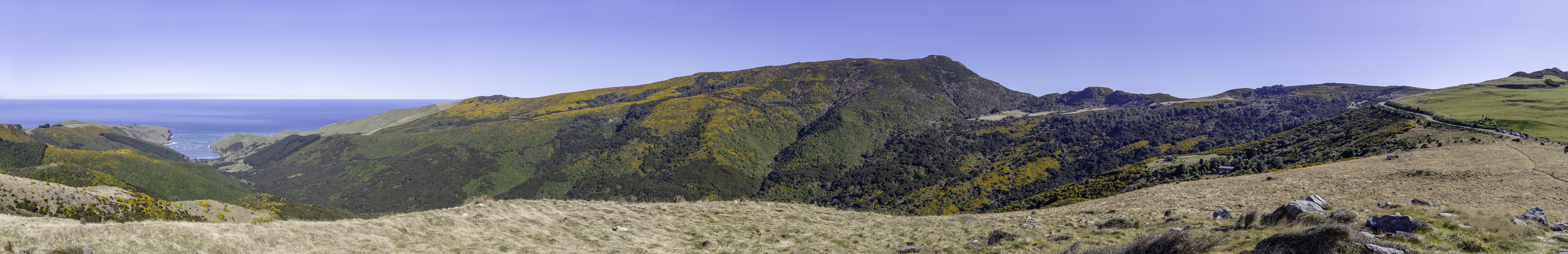
Panorama of the whole Hinewai Reserve. Taken from Mikimiki Knob in August 2019.

== See also ==
- Protected areas of New Zealand
- Gorse in New Zealand
