= Agricultural and Marketing Research and Development Trust =

Agency overview
- Headquarters: 8 Weld Street, PO Box 472, Feilding, New Zealand
- Agency executive: Tony Egan, Chairman
- Website: http://www.agmardt.org.nz/

The Agricultural and Marketing Research and Development Trust (AGMARDT) was established in October 1987 by the government of New Zealand. Its purpose is the "promotion and encouragement of New Zealand's interest in the agricultural, pastoral, horticultural and forestry industries".

Funds for the establishment of the trust came from the winding up of the British, Christmas Island and New Zealand Phosphate Commissions.

The trust's 2017 report shows grants made in the 2016/17 year totalled $NZ3.975 million.
