= Tradable sector =

The tradable sector of a country's economy is made up of the industry sectors whose output in terms of goods and services are traded internationally, or could be traded internationally given a plausible variation in relative prices. Most commonly, the tradable sector consists largely of sectors of the manufacturing industry, while the non-tradable sector consists of locally-rendered services, including health, education, retail and construction.

Tradable jobs can be performed by individuals outside a country: manufacturing, consulting, engineering, finance. Non-tradable jobs can realistically only be performed by domestic workforce: government, health care, hospitality, food service, education, retail, and construction.

== Economic significance ==
Economists distinguish between tradable and non-tradable sectors to analyze differences in productivity, wages, and price levels across countries. Productivity growth tends to be higher in tradable industries, which are exposed to international competition. Higher productivity in tradables can raise domestic wages, thereby increasing prices in non-tradable services and contributing to long-term structural changes in the economy.

== Australia ==
In 1990, Australia's sectoral outputs were 25.8% tradable and 74.2% non-tradable. Mining and manufacturing accounted for 18.3% and 61.4%, respectively, of the tradable sector.
