= Foray 48B =

Foray 48B in an insecticide manufactured by Valent BioSciences used in forestry to selectively kill the larval stage of insect in the order Lepidoptera (moths and butterflies). The active ingredient is Bacillus thuringiensis var kurstaki (Btk).
