= Gorse in New Zealand =

Invasive plant species in New Zealand

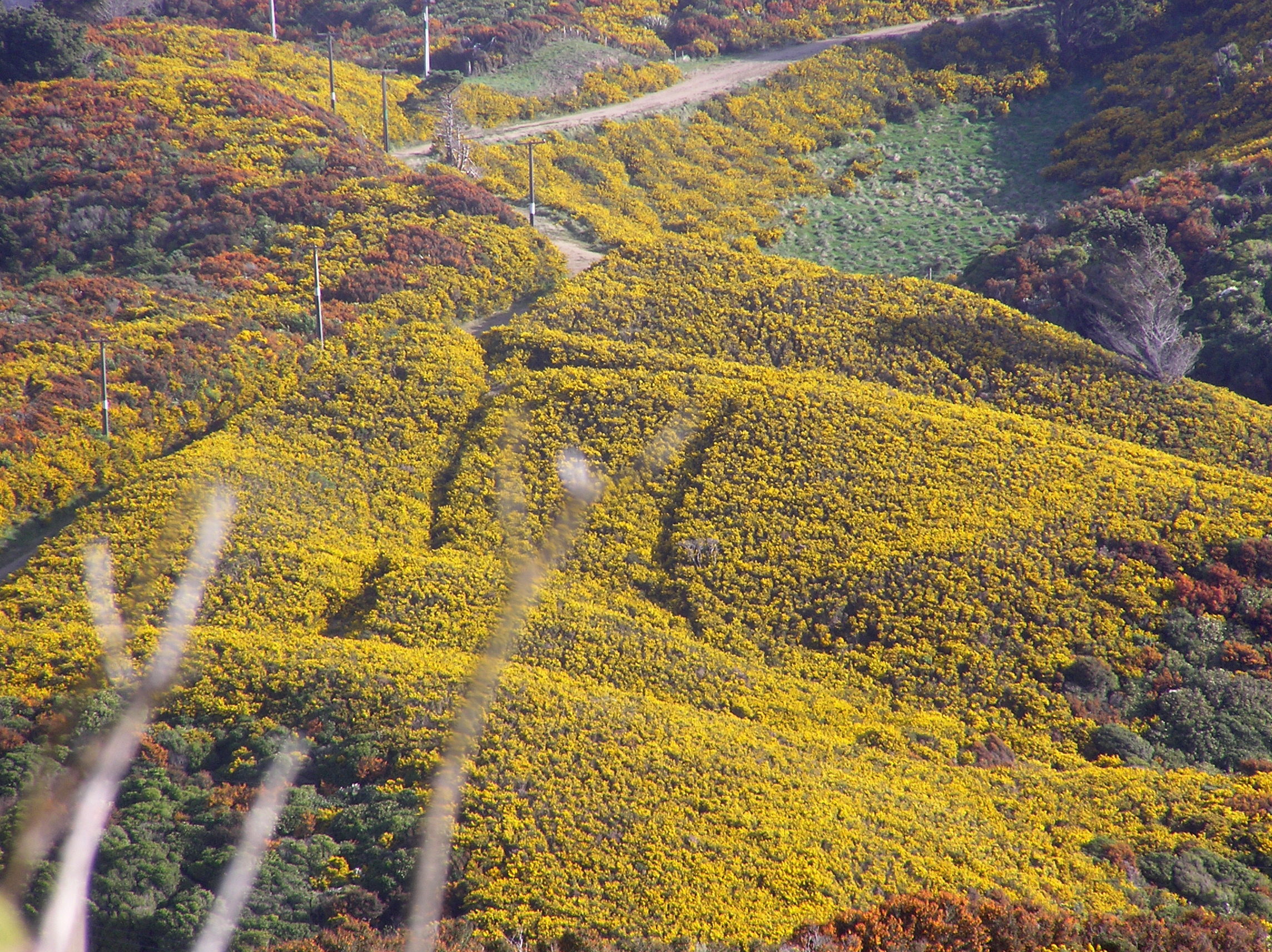
Gorse covering hillside previously cleared of native forest for farming, Wellington, NZ

Gorse (Ulex europaeus) was introduced to New Zealand in the early stages of European settlement. It is now a major invasive plant species with millions of dollars spent on its control.

== Introduction to New Zealand ==
Introduced from Western Europe in the very early stages of European settlement, it was recorded by Charles Darwin during his voyage through New Zealand waters in 1835 as growing in hedges in the Bay of Islands. Its spread and development as a weed in New Zealand's temperate climate was rapid, but settlers failed to recognise the threat; gorse seed continued to be imported and plantings deliberately established into the 1900s.

== Uses ==
Gorse has been used for hedges and windbreaks on the Canterbury Plains since the 1850s. These windbreaks have a combined length of 300,000 kilometres.

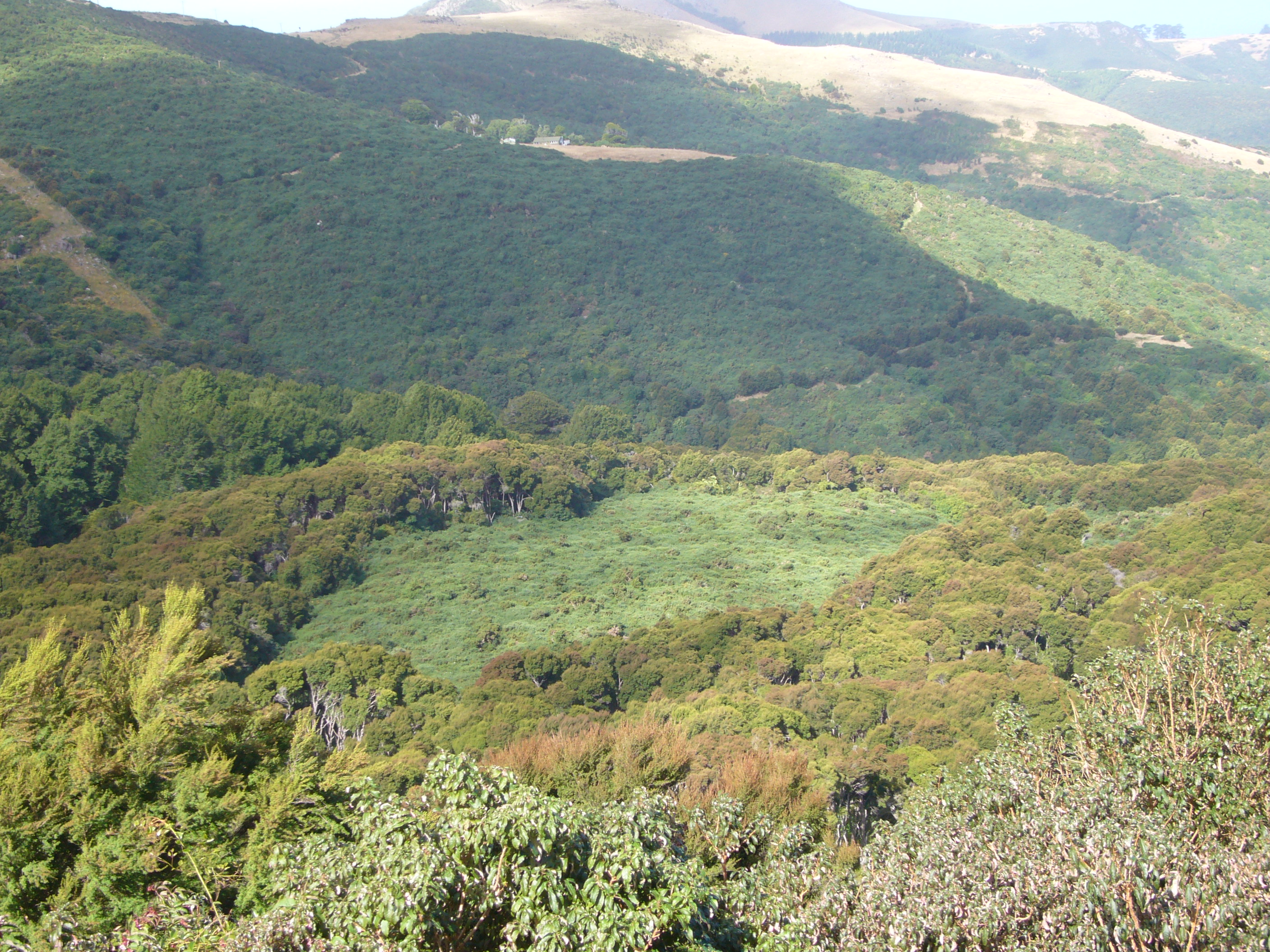
A patch of gorse surrounded by regenerating native bush at Hinewai Reserve on Banks Peninsula.

Gorse has been found to form a useful nursery for many species for native bush regeneration. When young, gorse bushes are very dense. As they grow older, they become 'leggy', and provide the ideal conditions for native seeds to germinate and grow. The native seedlings grow up through the gorse, cutting out its light and eventually replacing it. This technique is working successfully and within a short time frame at Hinewai Reserve on Banks Peninsula.

== Problems ==
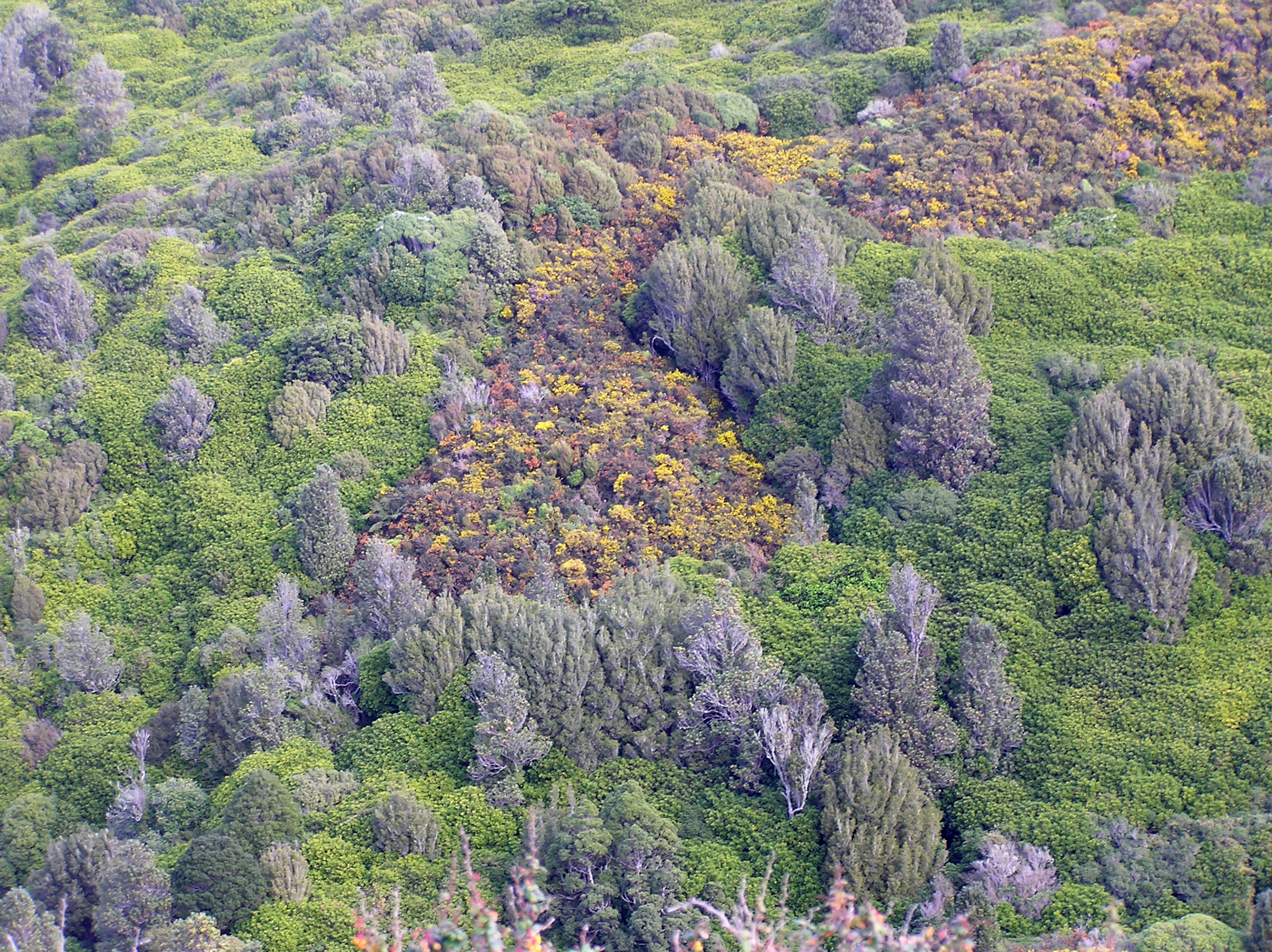
Example of gorse being one of the fastest plants to colonise disturbed areas of forest, Wellington, NZ

The introduction resulted in large spreading infestations over hundreds of hectares, peaking in the late 1940s. It was recognised as a threat as early as 1861 with the Provincial Council in Nelson passing an act to prevent the planting of gorse hedges. The seed can lie dormant on the ground for up to 50 years, germinating quickly after the adults have been removed. Unfortunately, most methods of removing adult gorse plants, such as burning or bulldozing them, create the ideal conditions for the gorse seeds to germinate and total eradication with current technology seems impossible. Gorse is now one of the most widely recognised agricultural weeds in New Zealand. It covers 700,000 hectares (1,700,000 acres) at varying densities — a total of 5% of the land area of New Zealand when excluding existing indigenous forest, vegetated sub-alpine and alpine areas. Gorse became New Zealand's most costly weed to control, an estimated $22 million per annum by the early 1980s.

== Biological control ==
Current research areas are active management of control agents, development of a bioherbicide, and the use of modelling.

Biological pest control of gorse has been investigated since the 1920s. Seven different agents have been released in New Zealand. Results have been mixed, but in general neither the seed-feeding nor foliage-feeding insects are doing enough damage to be viable as a stand-alone control agent.

== See also ==
- Agriculture in New Zealand
- Conservation in New Zealand
- Pesticides in New Zealand
