= Soil & Health Association of New Zealand =

Soil & Health Association of New Zealand, established in 1941, is an organisation that promotes organic food and farming in New Zealand.

The organisation publishes the Organic NZ magazine.

== See also ==
- Organic farming in New Zealand
- Agriculture in New Zealand
