= Pastoral Greenhouse Gas Research Consortium =

PGGRC logo.

The Pastoral Greenhouse Gas Research Consortium (PGGRC) carries out research to find methods of reducing greenhouse gas emissions from livestock. The consortium, established in 2004, has a Memorandum of Understanding with the New Zealand Government.

As of 2023, half of the greenhouse gas emissions in New Zealand are due to agriculture. The New Zealand government signed and ratified the Kyoto Protocol and methods have being sought to seek a reduction of these emissions.

In 2003 the Government attempted to impose an Agricultural emissions research levy on farmers to fund research into agricultural emissions reduction but it proved to be unpopular and the proposal was abandoned. The PGGRC is an alternative method of addressing agricultural emissions.

== Partners ==
The partners in the consortium are:

- AgResearch
- Fonterra
- Fert Research
- PGG Wrightson
- DairyNZ
- Deer Research
- Meat & Wool New Zealand

Associate members are the Ministry of Agriculture and Forestry, NIWA and Foundation for Research, Science and Technology. Research is carried out by AgResearch, DairyNZ, LIC and Lincoln University.

== See also ==
- Agriculture in New Zealand
- Climate change in New Zealand
- Environment of New Zealand
