= List of botanical gardens in New Zealand =

Botanical gardens in New Zealand generally have collections consisting of New Zealand native and endemic species, but most also have collections that include plants from around the world. There are botanical gardens and arboreta in all regions of New Zealand, most are administered by local governments, some are privately owned.

== In the North Island ==
- Auckland Botanic Gardens
- Bason Botanic Gardens, Whanganui
- Eastwoodhill Arboretum, Gisborne
- Gisborne Botanical Gardens
- Hackfalls Arboretum, Gisborne District
- Hamilton Gardens
- Napier Botanical Gardens
- Ōtari-Wilton's Bush, Wellington
- Pukeiti, New Plymouth
- Pukekura Park, New Plymouth
- Waitakaruru Arboretum, Waikato Region
- Wellington Botanic Garden

== In the South Island ==
- Christchurch Botanic Gardens
- Dunedin Botanic Garden
- Glenfalloch Gardens, Otago Peninsula
- Larnach Castle, Otago Peninsula
- Oamaru Botanic Gardens
- Queens Park, Invercargill
- Queenstown Gardens
- Timaru Botanic Gardens, Timaru
