= Gardening in New Zealand =

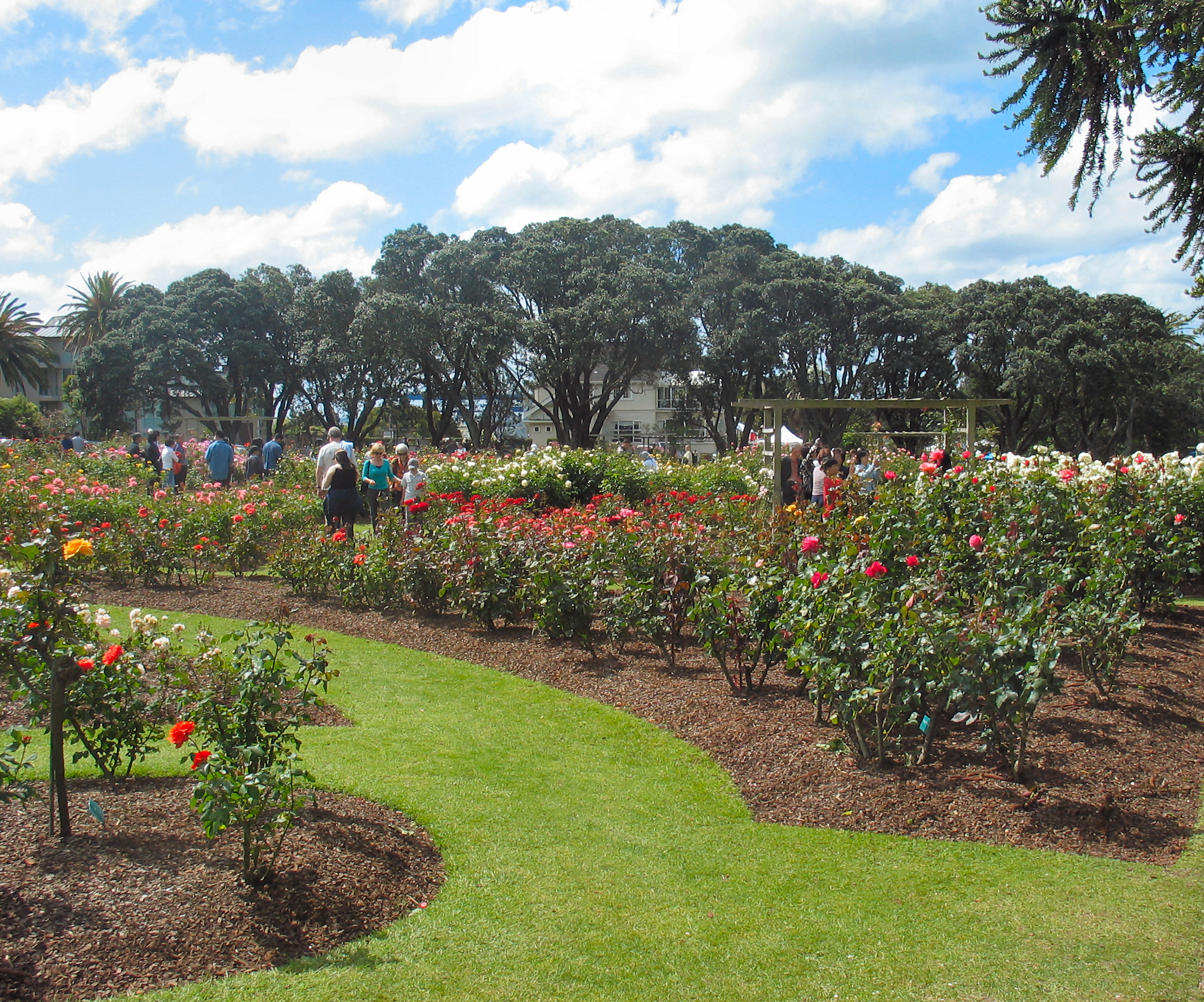
Parnell Rose Gardens during the 2006 Rose Festival.

Gardening is a popular pastime in New Zealand. A 2007/2008 survey of physical activities found that 43% of New Zealanders had participated in gardening in the previous 12 months. A range of books, magazines and television programmes are dedicated to the topic.

New Zealand has restrictions on trading during the Easter holiday break, and in recent years garden supply centres have flouted the law and remained open.

== Gardens ==
- Ayrlies Garden
- Caccia Birch House
- Dunedin Chinese Garden
- Government Gardens
- Ohinetahi
- Parnell Rose Gardens
- Pukeiti Rhododendron Trust

=== Botanical gardens ===
- Auckland Botanic Gardens
- Bason Botanic Gardens
- Christchurch Botanic Gardens
- Dunedin Botanic Gardens
- Gisborne Botanical Gardens
- Hamilton Gardens
- Ōtari-Wilton's Bush
- Queenstown Gardens
- Wellington Botanic Garden

=== Arboreta ===
- Eastwoodhill Arboretum
- Hackfalls Arboretum

== Events ==
- Ellerslie Flower Show
- Auckland Flower Show
- Taranaki Garden Festival

== Gardeners and horticulturists ==
- Maggie Barry presented a television show and writes a gardening column
- Bob Berry
- Lady Anne Berry
- William Douglas Cook
- Barbara Winifred Matthews
- James William Matthews
- Eion Scarrow
- Emily Stevens

== Environmental issues ==
With the European settlement of New Zealand, which occurred in relatively recent times from an ecological perspective, a wide range of plants were introduced into the country for both agriculture and for gardens. Many of the plants went on to become invasive species.

Some notable examples of invasive plants that are used in gardens include:

- Agapanthus (Agapanthus praecox)
- Blue morning glory (Ipomoea indica)
- Old man's beard (Clematis vitalba)

== Online hoax ==
New Zealand has been at the centre of an online hoax about prohibition of home gardening, where residents of New Zealand supposedly had their gardens containing such plants as avocado trees and feijoa trees confiscated or destroyed.

The topic garnered further attention when a blog post in 2020 which was widely replicated on facebook claimed that a new food bill would require home gardeners to obtain authorisation to share home-grown plant matter, giving food safety officers the power to perform raids on property. The post was in fact referring to a 2010 bill that was passed into law as the Food Act 2014, which specifically excludes "seeds... or other plant material intended for planting" from the scope of the legislation. The blog post has largely been debunked as sensationalism.

== Plants ==
Feijoa sellowiana are popular garden plants in New Zealand, which produces one of the most popular fruits in New Zealand.

== See also ==
- New Zealand Gardens Trust
- Culture of New Zealand
- Environment of New Zealand
- Gardening in Australia
- Gardening in Scotland
- Gardening in Spain
