= Biosecurity in New Zealand =

Biosecurity in New Zealand guards against threats to agriculture and biodiversity, with strict border control measures being taken to prevent unwanted organisms from entering the country. New Zealand is an island nation that is geographically isolated from any other significant landmass. The species that are present evolved in the absence of organisms from elsewhere and display a high degree of endemism. Notable is the lack of land-based mammals, except for two species of bat. Indigenous species are at risk from population decline or extinction if any invasive species are introduced. The Ministry for Primary Industries (MPI) is the government department in charge of overseeing New Zealand's biosecurity. The Biosecurity Act 1993, which was a world first for biosecurity control, was passed to "restate and reform the law relating to the exclusion, eradication, and effective management of pests and unwanted organisms".

An RFID tag-enabled database, the National Animal Identification and Tracing (NAIT) system designed for tracing livestock was introduced in 2012, but in 2017, the Mycoplasma bovis outbreak investigation indicated that it was not being fully complied with.

== History ==
The current government agency responsible for biosecurity in New Zealand is the Ministry for Primary Industries. It comprises five business units (Agriculture and Investment Services, Biosecurity New Zealand, Fisheries New Zealand, New Zealand Food Safety and Te Uru Rākau - New Zealand Forest Service.)

A merger in 2012 established the current structure of the Ministry for Primary Industries. Prior to this, biosecurity was the responsibility of the Ministry of Agriculture and Fisheries (MAF).

== Border controls ==
The Ministry for Primary Industries' Biosecurity New Zealand business unit is responsible for biosecurity at the border. As well as being responsible for biosecurity border control where there is international passenger and freight movement, Biosecurity New Zealand officials also undertake biosecurity control duties within the country.

At sea and airports, cargo, passengers and passenger baggage is checked for unwanted organisms; with any found being incinerated. Officials designated as "Quarantine officers" are uniformed enforcement officers that exercise numerous powers under the Biosecurity Act 1993 and other legislation. Passengers must sign a declaration form stating that they do not have anything that constitutes a biosecurity risk to New Zealand and can be fined for failing to do so. Visitors to New Zealand are most commonly fined for bringing fishing gear, seeds, fruits, bamboo and wooden products at the border.

At border control locations such as airports, beagles are used for detecting material that constitutes a biosecurity risk because they are relatively small and less intimidating for people who are uncomfortable around dogs, easy to care for, intelligent and work well for rewards.

If there is a threat of the spread of unwanted organisms within New Zealand, containment measures are carried out. For example, Didymo (Didymosphenia geminata), an invasive algae that was discovered in New Zealand in 2004, has been the subject of a nationwide campaign to prevent its spread. To prevent the spread of the spores of kauri dieback disease it is recommended that pathways in the forests are used and equipment should be cleaned before leaving an area where there are kauri trees.

=== Queensland fruit fly exclusion zone ===
The Queensland fruit fly (Bactrocera tryoni) has caused over $28.5 million a year in damage to Australian fruit crops. Thus, this species poses a risk to biosecurity in New Zealand. A fruit fly exclusion zone (FFEZ) limits the movement of fruit between Australian states and New Zealand.

== 2017 Mycoplasma bovis outbreak ==
On 21 July 2017 the Ministry for Primary Industries was informed that some cattle near Oamaru in the South Island were Mycoplasma bovis positive. Until then, New Zealand and Norway were the only OECD countries free of the disease. (The disease is not hazardous to humans.)

Initially it was thought that the disease had been contained within South Canterbury. However, subsequently, some 26,000 cattle were culled and in May 2018 the minister, Damien O'Connor, announced that the government had decided (after consultation with farmers) that elimination of the disease was proposed. This would require the culling of some 146,000 cattle over about two years, and would cost $886 million, compared with the cost of $1.2 billion to control the disease. Eradication would also be a "world first".

It appeared that perhaps 70% of farmers were not fully complying with the requirements since 2012 to track movements of cattle, particularly calves sold "for cash". Another possibility is the illegal importing of drugs by veterinary companies. The latest estimate of the number to be culled was 152,000 in June 2018; 126,000 plus the 26,000 already culled.

In August 2018, a Southland farmer who was traced as the original source for the outbreak was charged under the Biosecurity Act regarding importation of some farm machinery.

== Mediterranean fruit fly incursions ==
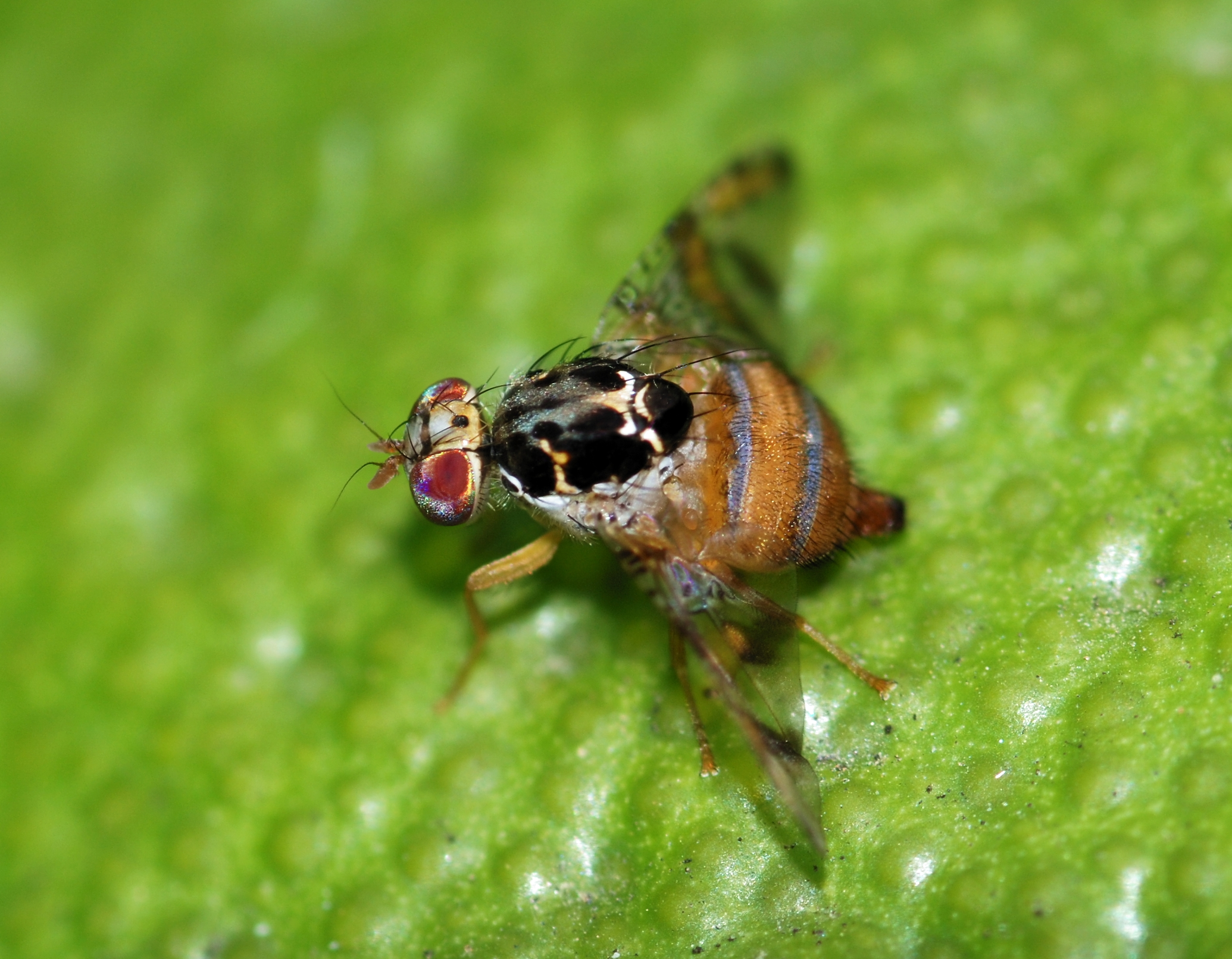
The Mediterranean fruit fly

The Mediterranean fruit fly (Ceratitis capitata) is one of the most destructive fruit pests in the world. As larvae, they infest and damage fruit such as apples and kiwifruit, which also enable them to be unknowingly transported overseas, where they can potentially establish in other countries. Despite efforts to prevent its establishment in New Zealand, in 1907 the fly was detected breeding in Napier in the North Island and Blenheim in the South Island. Later, a remnant population was also detected in a Devonport garden in 1908. To eradicate the fly populations, the government assigned William Boucher, a pomologist (an expert on fruit). The infested fruit was destroyed and then the ground of the affected garden areas was drenched with kerosene which was used as an insecticide at the time. This was apparently successful as the fly wasn’t detected with further monitoring.

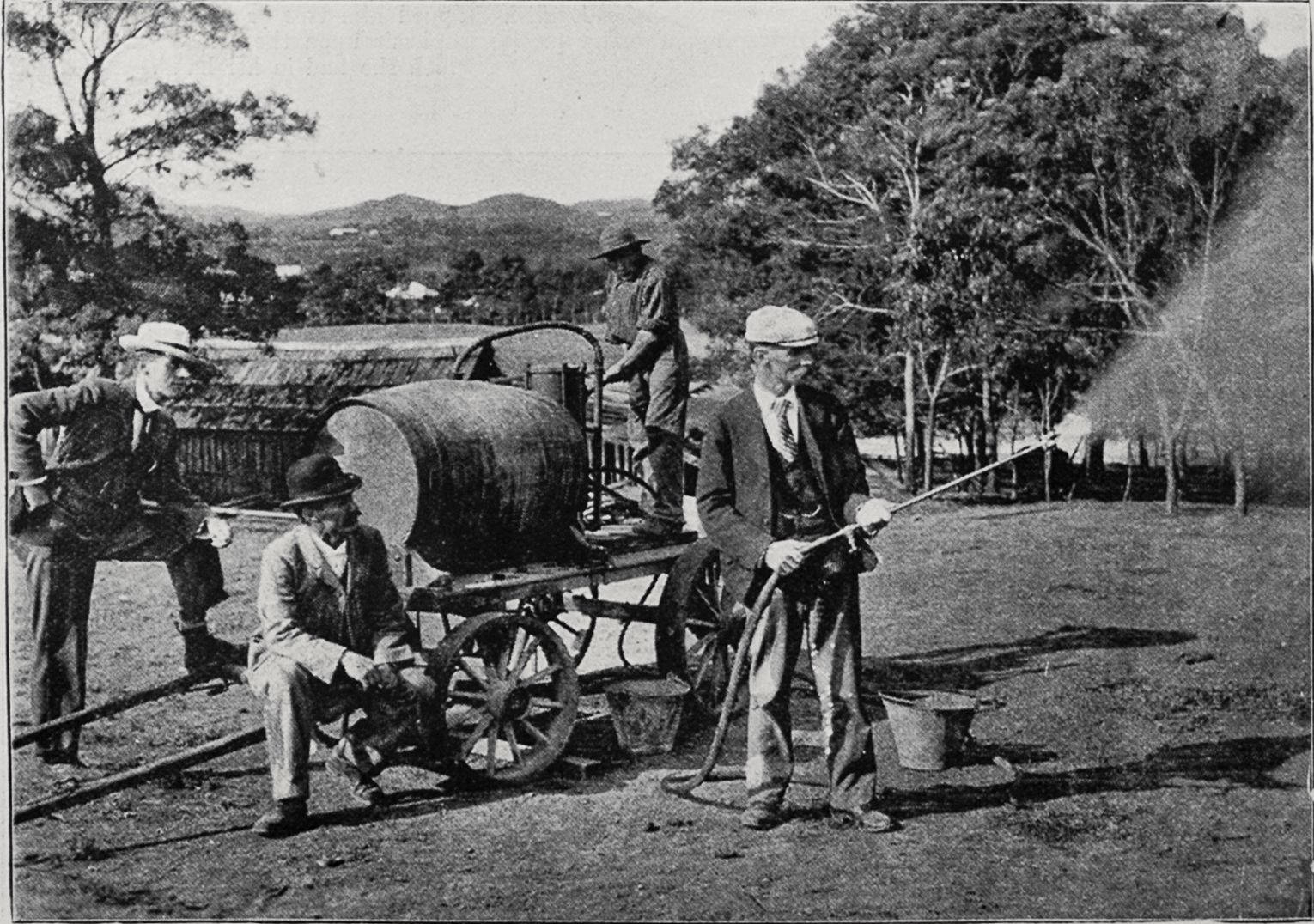
William Boucher using a bean pump, one of the tools for eradicating the fly

In 1921 the fly was detected again in Dargaville in the North Island. George Harnett, a fruit inspector, identified the fly from infected peaches collected from a garden. In response, fruit found in the area was cooked in an attempt to prevent the establishment of the fly. This effort was apparently successful as follow up surveys were unable to find more flies. Later in 1996, the fly was found once again at Mt Roskill in Auckland, possibly originating from Hawaii. The fly was caught in traps used for routine monitoring to detect threats such as these. In response, the Ministry of Agriculture intensified monitoring in the area and began an eradication programme that sprayed host trees and laced protein bait with insecticide in the immediate area. The eradication programme was successful and New Zealand remains free of the fly.

Due to the absence of the fruit fly, New Zealand is able to trade fruit such as apples and kiwifruit overseas in premium markets that won’t risk importing potentially infested fruit (such as countries where the fly is not established). In one study, it was estimated that the absence of fruit flies from New Zealand benefited apple and kiwifruit exports by 7.6 to 10.2 billion NZD up to 2020 and now contributes around 0.5% of the country's GDP.

== Yellow-legged hornet incursion ==
In mid-2025, two male yellow-legged hornets were found in the Auckland suburbs of Grafton and Albany. On the 17 of October, Biosecurity New Zealand removed a nest in Glenfield. 34 queen hornets had been found and destroyed by mid-December, which increased to 49 by February and to 77 by April. The hornets were mostly found around the North Shore and none have been found since April 2026.

This was the first time that queen yellow-legged hornets had been found in New Zealand. Hornets can be very destructive as they prey on honeybees, which are critical to New Zealand's primary industries. They can also sting humans.

Biosecurity NZ utilized radio tracking and poisoned bait to help track and kill the hornets. Scientists from the Bioeconomy Science Institute also trialed the use of environmental DNA sampling of fresh water to trace the presence of the hornets. In early December, the Beehive announced their support for the response.

== Other notable incursions ==
There have been a number of biosecurity breaches in New Zealand, and on occasion widespread eradications of pest organisms have been carried out.

- The painted apple moth was discovered in Auckland in 1999. A biocontainment area was set up and a controversial spray programme carried out to eradicate the moth. Claims that it caused cancer were not upheld.
- A single male gypsy moth was caught in a surveillance trap in 2003 within the limits of Hamilton city. An aerial insecticide application programme was initiated to prevent the establishment of any potential population.
- The Varroa mite was thought to have become established in New Zealand due to a queen bee being smuggled into the country.
- The Queensland fruit fly (Bactrocera tryoni) was discovered in Auckland in 2012 and 2015, resulting in a temporary ban on the movement of plant products in parts of Auckland.
- The plant pathogen Pseudomonas syringae pv. actinidiae (PSA), which affects kiwifruit, is thought to have arrived in New Zealand 18 months prior to observed symptoms of the disease. In 2018 growers (but not other operators) won a court case against the government, which found that the government breached its "duty of care" to growers, and the 2010 outbreak was on the "balance of probabilities" due to the importing of kiwifruit pollen by a Te Puke company from 2007 to 2010.
- Myrtle rust (Puccinia psidii) was found in a Kerikeri nursery in May 2017. The rust has now been confirmed at more than 100 locations across Taranaki, Te Puke, Waikato, Northland, Auckland and Wellington.

In May 2005, a hoax claim was made that foot and mouth disease had been released on Waiheke Island and would be released elsewhere unless money was paid and tax reforms made. A full agricultural exotic disease response was initiated. No livestock were allowed to enter or leave the island and stock on the island was tested every 48 hours for symptoms of the virus, which would devastate New Zealand's agricultural exports. After three weeks of testing, no infected animals were detected and the response staff were stood down.

== See also ==
- Conservation in New Zealand
- Environment of New Zealand
- Invasive species in New Zealand
- Regulation of animal research in New Zealand
- Border Patrol, a television series about the work of Customs, the Ministry for Primary Industries, and the New Zealand Immigration Service
