= Invasive species in New Zealand =

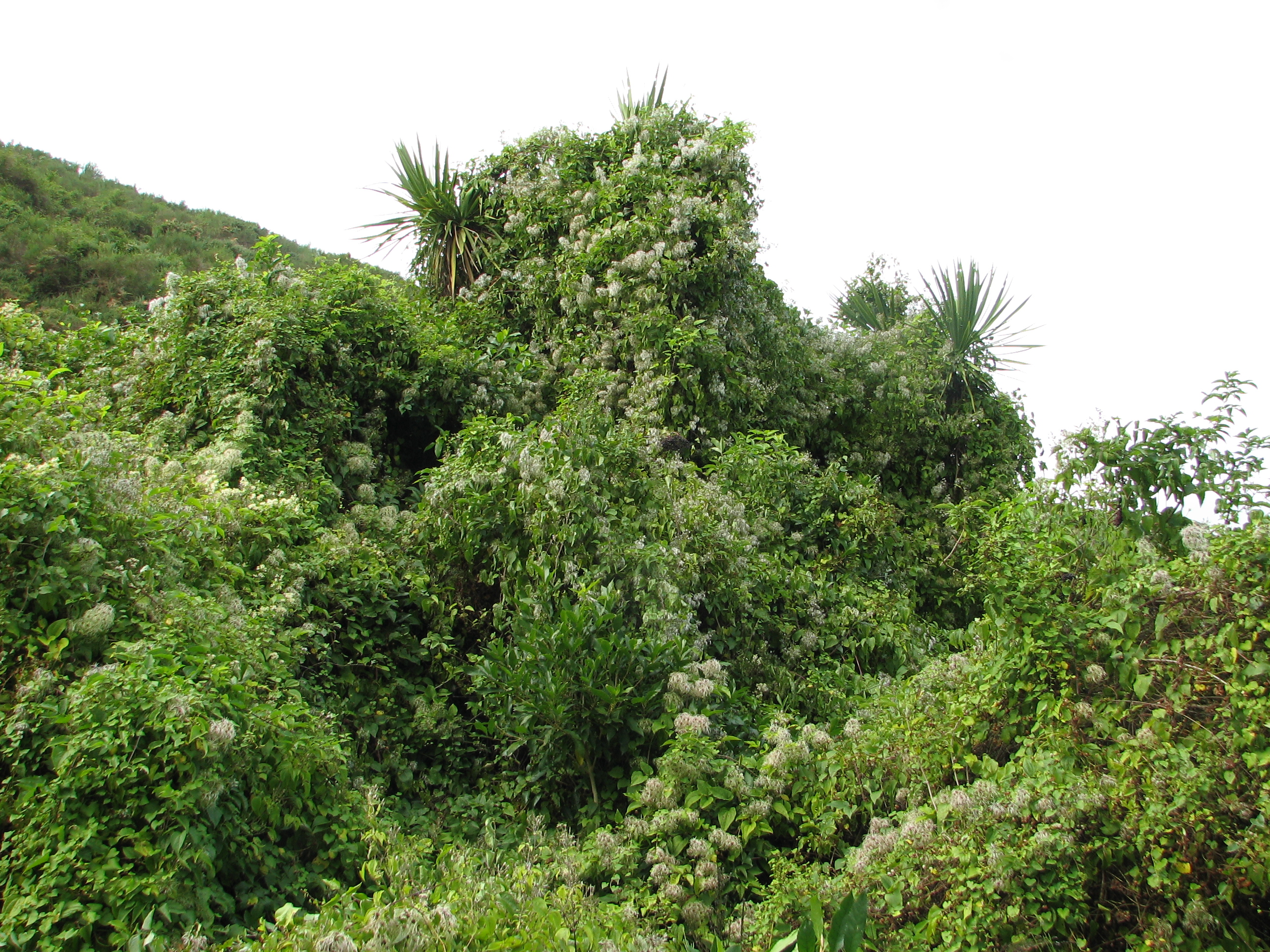
Clematis vitalba (old man's beard) smothering a cabbage tree (Cordyline australis) in the Port Hills of Christchurch

A number of introduced species, some of which have become invasive species, have been added to New Zealand's native flora and fauna. Both deliberate and accidental introductions have been made from the time of the first human settlement, with several waves of Polynesian people at some time before the year 1300, followed by Europeans after 1769.

Almost without exception, the introduced species have been detrimental to the native flora and fauna, but some, such as farmed sheep and cows and the clover upon which they feed, now form a large part of the economy of New Zealand. The possibility of introduced herbivores (deer) to serve as ecological proxies for extinct moa has been questioned.

Biosecurity New Zealand maintains registers and lists of species that are invasive, potentially invasive, or a threat to agriculture or biodiversity. They also manage a small number of species under the National Interest Pest Responses (NIPR) programme. The rainbow lorikeet is the one animal that has been covered by the NIPR, and was eradicated in 2014. All the other species covered by the NIPR, past or present, are weeds.

== Animal species ==
Many invasive animal species are listed in schedules 5 and 6 of the Wildlife Act 1953. Those in Schedule 5 have no protection and may be killed. Those in Schedule 6 are declared to be noxious animals and subject to the Wild Animal Control Act 1977. In 2016 the New Zealand government introduced Predator Free 2050, a project to eliminate all non-native predators (such as rats, possums and stoats) by 2050.

Some of the invasive animal species are as follows.

=== Mammals ===
- Brown rat (Rattus norvegicus), also known as Norway rat – Species of common rat
- Black rat (Rattus rattus) – Species of rodent
- Kiore, also known as Polynesian rat – Species of rodent
- Cat
- Chamois – Species of antelope
- Common brushtail possum (Trichosurus vulpecula) – Invasive pest in New Zealand
- Dog
- European hare
- European hedgehog
- European rabbit (Oryctolagus cuniculus)
- Fallow deer
- Ferret (Mustela putorius furo)
- Goat
- Himalayan tahr
- Horse (Equus ferus caballus)
- House mouse (Mus musculus)
- Least weasel
- Pig
- Stoat (Mustela erminea)
- Red deer
- Rusa deer
- Sambar deer
- Sika deer
- Wallaby
- Wapiti (elk)
- Whitetail deer

=== Reptiles ===
- Plague skink or rainbow skink (Lampropholis delicata)

=== Birds ===
- Australian magpie
- Canada goose – Game bird in New Zealand
- Cirl bunting – Species of bird
- Common myna
- Common redpoll
- Common starling – Species of passerine birds
- Dunnock – Species of bird
- European goldfinch – Species of bird
- European greenfinch – Species of bird
- Mallard
- Mute Swan
- Rainbow lorikeet – Species of bird
- Rook – Species of bird in the crow family Corvidae
- Yellowhammer – Passerine bird in the bunting family that is native to Eurasia

=== Fish ===
- Koi
- Gambusia affinis
- Common rudd
- Catfish – Order of fish
- Brown trout

=== Invertebrates ===
- Argentine ant (Linepithema humile)
- Asian paddle crab (Charybdis japonica)
- Asian paper wasp (Polistes chinensis)
- Australian paper wasp (Polistes humilis)
- Carpet sea squirt (Didemnum vexillum)
- Common wasp (Vespula vulgaris)
- European paper wasp (Polistes dominula)
- German wasp (Vespula germanica)
- Varroa mite (Varroa destructor)

==== Spiders ====
- As of 18 January 2021 there are 73 known introduced spiders, of which 50 are Australian, including

- Philoponella congregabilis
- The redback, Latrodectus hasselti, thought to have arrived with a steel shipment in the 1980s

== Plant and other non-animal species ==
The National Pest Plant Accord, with a listing of about 120 genus, species, hybrids and subspecies, was developed to limit the spread of plant pests. Invasive plants are classified as such on a regional basis with some plants declared as national plant pests. Biosecurity New Zealand manages a small number of weeds under the National Interest Pest Responses programme. As of May 2024, NIPR covers nine weeds. Hornwort (Ceratophyllum demersum) was covered until it was eradicated in 2014. Additionally, as at 2024 the Department of Conservation lists 386 vascular plant species as environmental weeds.

Some of the better-known invasive plant species are:

- Acacia species (mostly Australian) especially wattle
- Acanthus - bear's breeches
- Agapanthus
- Arrowhead (Sagittaria sagittifolia)
- Arundo donax - giant reed (or elephant grass)
- Asiatic knotweed (Reynoutria japonica or Fallopia japonica)
- Banana passionfruit – Species of plant
- Blackberry – Fruit of Rubus species
- Boneseed (Chrysanthemoides monilifera)
- Boxthorn (Lycium ferossimum)
- Broom (Cytisus scoparius)
- Buckthorn (Rhamnus alaternus)
- Californian thistle (Cirsium arvense)
- Cape sundew (Drosera capensis)
- Cape tulip – Genus of flowering plants
- Castor oil plant (Ricinus communis)
- Caulerpa brachypus
- Caulerpa parvifolia
- Christmasberry (Schinus terebinthifolius)
- Climbing asparagus (Asparagus scandens)
- Cotoneaster
- Montbretia Irises
- Dactylis ("Cocksfoot" grasses)
- Darwin's barberry (Berberis darwnii)
- Didymosphenia geminata ("didymo" or "rock snot")
- Field horsetail (Equisetum arvense)
- Glyceria maxima, also called Poa aquatica
- Gorse (Ulex europaeus)
- Heather (Calluna vulgaris)
- Japanese honeysuckle (Lonicera japonica)
- Jasmine (Jasminum polyanthum)
- Kahili ginger (Hedychium gardnerianum)
- Lantana camara
- Lodgepole pine (Pinus contorta)
- Loquat (Eriobotrya japonica)
- Lupin – Genus of leguminous plants
- Madeira vine (Anredera cordifolia)
- Mexican daisy (Erigeron karvinskianus)
- Mexican devil (Ageratina adenophora)
- Mile-a-minute (Dipogon lignosus)
- Mistflower (Ageratina riparia)
- Morning glory (Convolvulus)
- Moth plant (Araujia sericifera)
- Old man's beard (Clematis vitalba)
- Oxygen weed (Egeria)
- Oxygen weed (Lagarosiphon major)
- Pampas grass (Cortaderia selloana)
- Privet – Number of shrubs or trees in the genus Ligustrum
  - Tree privet (Ligustrum lucidum)
  - Chinese privet (Ligustrum sinense)
- Purple loosestrife (Lythrum salicaria)
- Queen of the night (Cestrum nocturnum)
- Ragwort – Genus of flowering plants
- Rhododendron ponticum
- Royal fern (Osmunda regalis)
- Salix cinerea (gray willow)
- Salix × fragilis (crack willow)
- Scotch thistle (Onopordum acanthium)
- Smilax (Asparagus asparagoides)
- Spikemoss
- Sycamore (Acer pseudoplatanus)
- Tradescantia fluminensis
- Water pennywort (Hydrocotyle umbellata)
- Woolly nightshade (Solanum mauritianum)
- Yellow flag (Iris pseudacorus)
- Zantedeschia ("Arum Lily")

Auckland has been declared to be the weediest city in the world.

== See also ==
- Fauna of New Zealand
- Invasive species of New Zealand origin

=== Animals in New Zealand ===
- Gypsy moths in New Zealand – Lymantria dispar dispar in New Zealand
- Painted apple moth in New Zealand – Invasive moth species in New Zealand

=== Plants in New Zealand ===
- Blue morning glory in New Zealand – Species of flowering plant
- Wilding conifer – Invasive trees in New Zealand
