= Hunting in New Zealand =

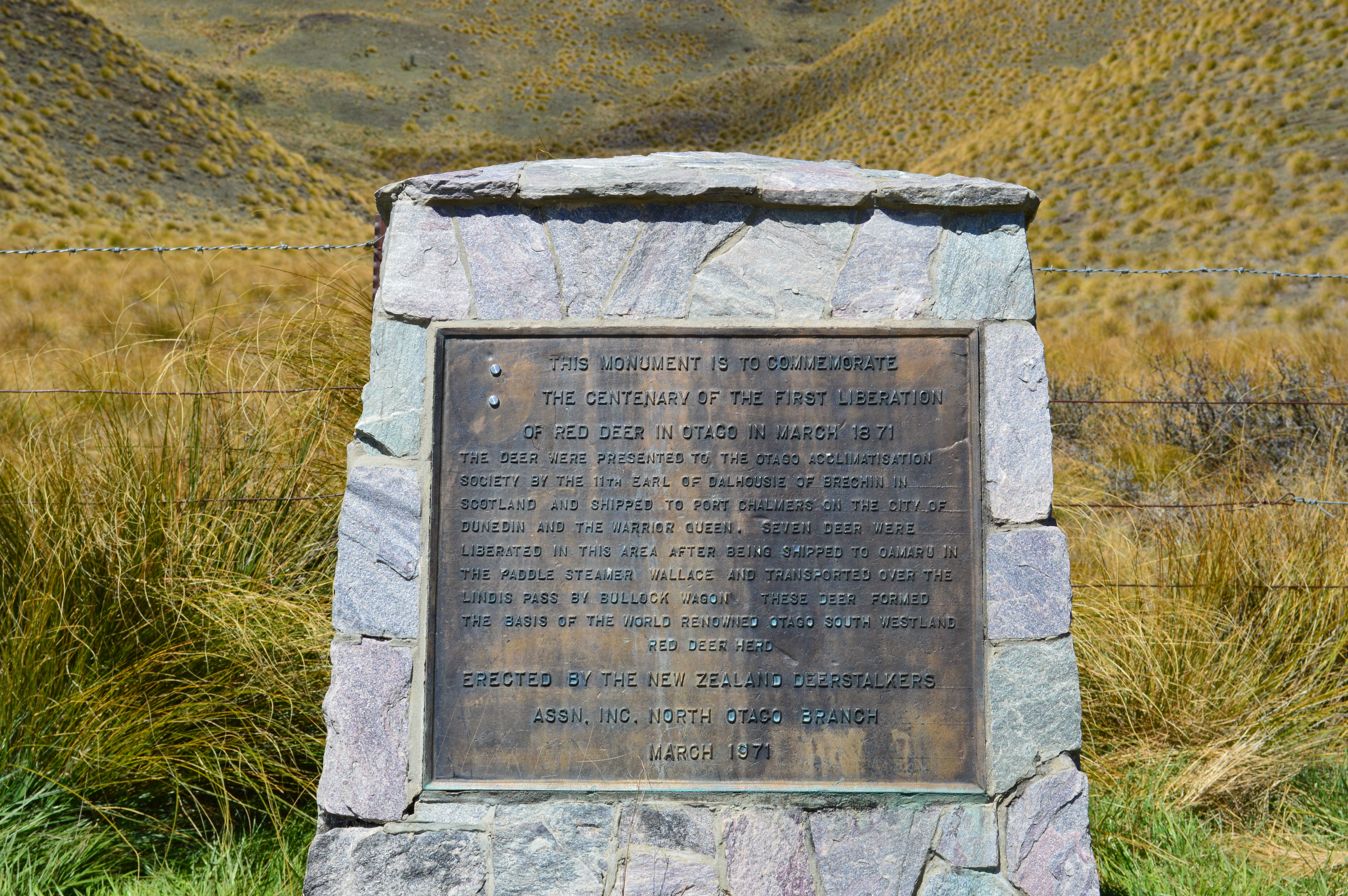
A memorial on the Lindis Pass erected in 1971 commemorating the release of red deer in Otago in 1871.

Hunting is a popular recreational pursuit and a tourist activity in New Zealand with numerous books and magazines published on the topic. Unlike most other developed countries with a hunting tradition, there are no bag-limits or seasons for hunting large game in New Zealand. Hunting in national parks is allowed by permit. The wide variety of game animals and the limited restrictions means hunting is a popular pastime which has resulted in a high level of firearms ownership among civilians.

Prior to human settlement New Zealand had no land based mammals other than two species of bats, one of which is now extinct, and two species of Otariidae. European settlers introduced a wide range of animals including some specifically for game hunting. Acclimatisation societies were active for a period of 60 years from the 1860s in having introduced animals established in New Zealand. The majority were introduced for food or sport. In the 1980s Recreational Hunting Areas (RHA's) were set up to support recreational hunting on conservation land. The RHA's are administered by the Department of Conservation.

Guided or independent hunting is open to non-resident hunters with a firearms licence and permit issued by the Department of Conservation. Because of the number of large game species and varied terrain available, New Zealand is a popular destination for hunting-based tourism.

== Government sanctioned deer culling ==
By the 1950s red deer were recognised as an animal pest which damaged the natural environment and the government began employing hunters to cull the deer population to prevent this damage. Networks of tracks with bridges and huts were set up to gain easy access into the backcountry. These tracks and huts, now maintained by the Department of Conservation, are popular for tramping.

== Types of hunting ==
=== Chamois ===
Chamois is a goat-antelope native to Europe. Alpine chamois arrived in New Zealand in 1907 as a gift from the Austrian Emperor, Franz Joseph I. The first surviving releases were made in the Aoraki / Mount Cook region and these animals gradually spread over much of the South Island. They are often referred to colloquially as "chamy" (pronounced "shammy").

In New Zealand, hunting of chamois is unrestricted and even encouraged by the Department of Conservation to limit the animal's impact on New Zealand's native alpine flora.

=== Deer ===
Fallow deer (Dama dama)

A smaller species of deer in New Zealand. Various genotypes exist with differing colour phases: (i) common, (ii) melanistic, (iii) menil and (iv) white. They are often found in bush closer to pasture/farmland, as they prefer grazing on grasses. Major herds are found in the North and South Islands of New Zealand.

Red deer (Cervus elaphus scoticus)

The red deer in New Zealand produce very large antlers and are regarded as amongst the best in the world by hunters. Along with the other introduced deer species they are however regarded as a pest by the Department of Conservation and have at times been heavily culled using professional hunters. Additionally many hunters and outdoors enthusiasts class deer in NZ as a resource, for both food, hobbies, and an economic (tourist attraction). Ongoing issues over their pest status continue to be debated between parties.

Rusa deer (Rusa timorensis)

A shy and challenging deer to find in New Zealand. Larger populations are found in Te Urewera National Park. Very elusive.

Sambar deer (Rusa unicolor)

A large bodied deer, antlers of 6 points are standard for mature stags. They are hunted on public and private land in the North Island of New Zealand.

Sika deer (Cervus nippon)

Sika deer were confined to the Kaweka and Kaimanawa Ranges but have been discovered in the Tararua and in Coromandel Ranges. It is thought that they had been transferred by recreational hunters. In 2009 it was discovered that they had been illegally released in the Toatoa Valley. Sika deer are one of the most sought after deer species to hunt in New Zealand. Found in the central North Island, many hunters and tourists enjoy chasing them. The Department of Conservation have been working with hunters to target mainly hinds, which ensures stags can develop to trophy potential and allow hunters (and tourists) the chance to secure a lifetime trophy.

Moose (Alces alces)

Ten moose (known in Britain and most of Europe as "elk") were introduced in Fiordland in 1910 but they were thought to have died off. Nevertheless, there have been reported sightings that were thought to be false until moose hair samples were found by a New Zealand scientist in 2002. Moose have had patchy sightings since the last was shot in 1956. There is still ongoing debate over their existence and likely will be until legitimate footage is taken, or an animal is shot.

Wapiti (Cervus canadensis)

Wapiti, also known as elk, are found in Fiordland National Park. These are large animals, growing very large antlers. Length has exceeded 140 centimetres (55 inches) in historic herds, but interbreeding with red deer has reduced the pure wapiti genetics. Antler length and spread often do not exceed 110 cm (45 in). Fiordland Wapiti Foundation have been working with Department of Conservation to actively control and protect this historic herd for hunting, through management of the population. This involves culling of red deer through aerial recovery, and also culling of hybrid red/wapiti in selection for pure wapiti type animals. Slowly genetics are becoming more pure wapiti, and antler length/points/span is increasing once again to trophy status.

Whitetail deer (Odocoileus virginianus)

These deer are found in the lower South Island, but predominantly on Stewart Island. They are challenging and elusive to hunt. They are much smaller in size compared to the American counterparts and do not produce trophy heads as large. Often the environment itself is an attraction to hunters, where many native birds are present, including kiwi roaming the forest during the day.

=== Pigs ===
They are widespread throughout New Zealand and commonly are hunted using dogs. Pigs range in size and in the wild can exceed 110 kilograms (250 lb). They are sought after by hunters as they have a unique free range taste. They can cause a large amount of damage to the environment through rooting up of native plants.

=== Tahr ===
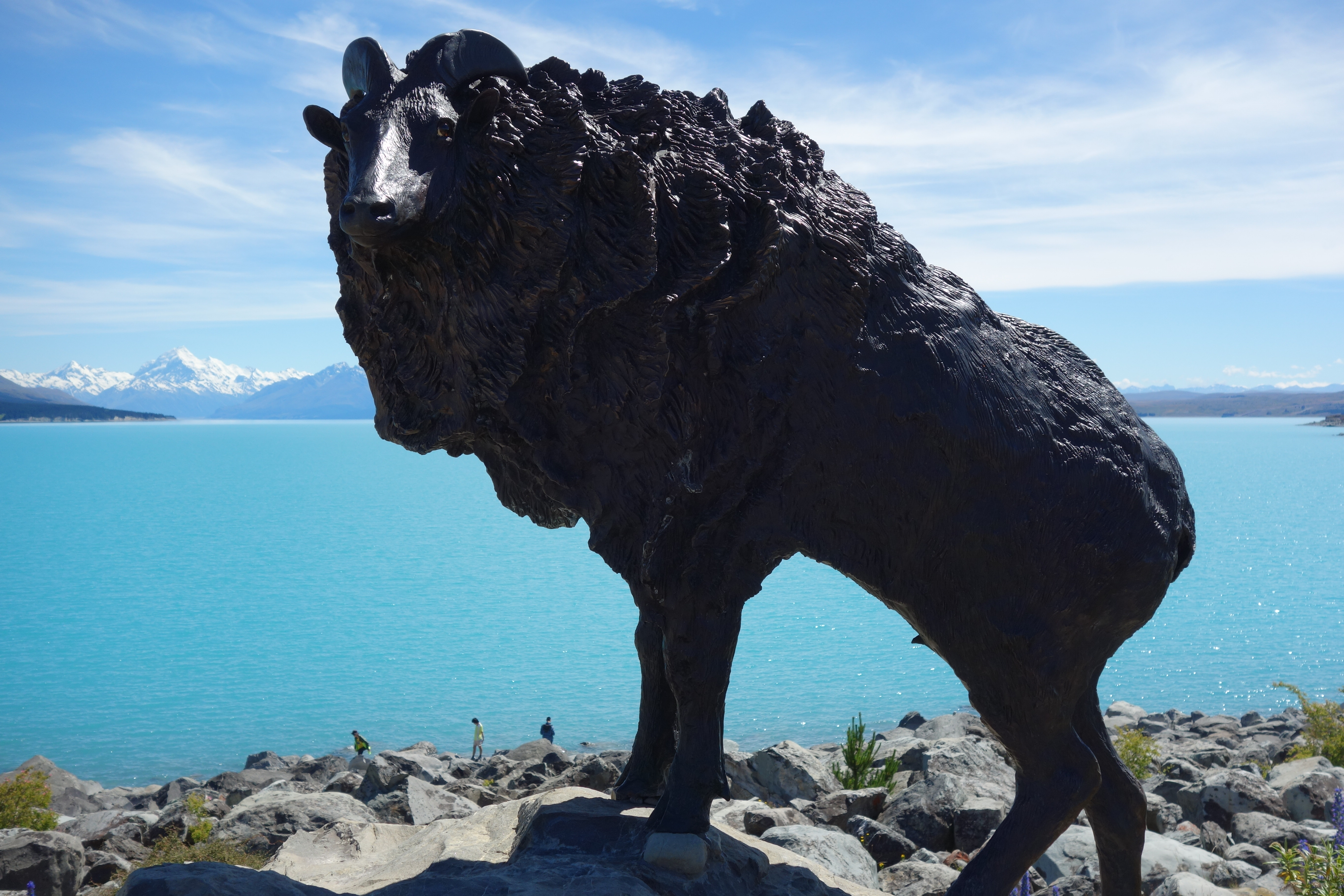
The Himalayan tahr sculpture unveiled in May 2014 at Lake Pukaki by Henrietta, Dowager Duchess of Bedford

Himalayan tahr, often simply known as "tahr", were gifted to the New Zealand government by the 11th Duke of Bedford in 1903; of the three males and three females, five survived the journey from Woburn Abbey and were released near the Hermitage Hotel at Mount Cook Village. He sent a further shipment in 1909 of six males and two females. Himalayan tahr are near-threatened in their native India and Nepal, but are so numerous in New Zealand's Southern Alps that they are hunted recreationally. At their peak in 1970, some 40,000 were in New Zealand. By 1984, the numbers had fallen to between 1,000 and 2,000 due to demand for tahr meat, which triggered a moratorium on commercial harvest. The Department of Conservation controls numbers to below 10,000.

A statue of a Himalayan tahr was unveiled in May 2014 at Lake Pukaki and dedicated by Henrietta, Dowager Duchess of Bedford.

Tahr are sought after by hunters for their meat, horns and skin. During winter bull tahrs develop a heavy mane and coat that is attractive as skin or rugs. Most hunters in New Zealand attempt to gain a trophy through climbing into the area where the tahr roam, upwards of 2,000 metres (6,600 ft), although hunting by helicopter has become more common in recent years.

=== Duck shooting ===
The duck shooting season opens in the first weekend of May and runs for 3 months. A licence must be obtained from Fish and Game New Zealand every season, at a cost of $80NZD (2010 Adult). These can be purchased from most outdoor sporting stores. Strict laws govern the number of birds which are allowed to be taken daily and may change between provinces. Laws also state that ducks must be shot with a shotgun while on the wing (flying). Although a mercy shot on the ground or water is an ethical responsibility of the hunter should a bird be injured during the initial shooting. In 2006 lead shot was banned from use while using 10 or 12 gauge shot on game birds within 200 m of any waterway. Nontoxic shot, mainly steel, is being used as a replacement.

Hunters often build blinds known as "maimais" to conceal themselves from ducks, often these are permanent structures besides or on rivers, lakes, lagoons or ponds. They vary in size from small (3x3m), to two storied house sized buildings, complete with running water and electricity. These maimais are then elaborately camouflaged, usually using a combination of live and dead vegetation, camouflaged paint jobs and camouflaged netting. Hunters will also hide in the vegetation near a waterway as a temporary maimai.

To aid luring ducks in, a variety of decoy ducks and duck callers can be purchased commercially, although some hunters prefer to make their own.

Duck species which may be legally hunted are the mallard (and hybrids thereof), Pacific black duck (known as grey ducks), paradise shelduck, and Australasian shoveller.

Most hunters use specially trained dogs to retrieve ducks which land on the water, and many discussions are held about the best breed for the job, although most will agree that almost any breed can be trained to retrieve.

Game birds in New Zealand are managed by Fish and Game New Zealand, previously the acclimatisation societies of New Zealand.

== Legislation ==
The Wild Animal Control Act 1977 regulates commercial and recreation hunting, and established the RHA's.

In 2012 the Game Animal Council Bill was opened up for submissions with the primary aim of establishing a Big Game Hunting Council as part of a national wild game management strategy. The bill is part of a support agreement between United Future and the National Party.

== Organisations ==
The Conservation Act 1987 established Fish and Game New Zealand as a statutory body to advocate for recreational hunting and fishing in New Zealand. It has statutory responsibility for the sports of freshwater sport-fishing and gamebird hunting. They are funded predominantly from the sale of hunting and fishing licenses.

The New Zealand Deerstalkers Association was established in 1937 to promote the interests of hunters in New Zealand.

Outdoor Recreation New Zealand lobbies for the hunting and fishing community. From 2002 to 2007 it functioned as a registered political party.

In 2011 the New Zealand government established the Game Animal Council to manage game animals. As well as managing tahr, chamois, deer and pig the council will promote hunters' safety and improve hunting opportunities. The New Zealand Deerstalkers Association and Tourism Industry Association welcomed the formation of the Game Animal Council but Forest and Bird, a large nationwide conservation organisation, sees it as an impediment to recreational hunters.

The New Zealand Game Industry Board is a statutory marketing authority established by regulations made under the Primary Products Marketing Act 1953.

== See also ==
- Helicopter-based hunting in Fiordland
- Muttonbirding
- 1080 usage in New Zealand
- Canada goose in New Zealand
- Invasive species in New Zealand
- Barry Crump, a popular New Zealand writer who often incorporated his experiences as a government deer-culler into his books
