= Agapanthus in New Zealand =

Flower in New Zealand

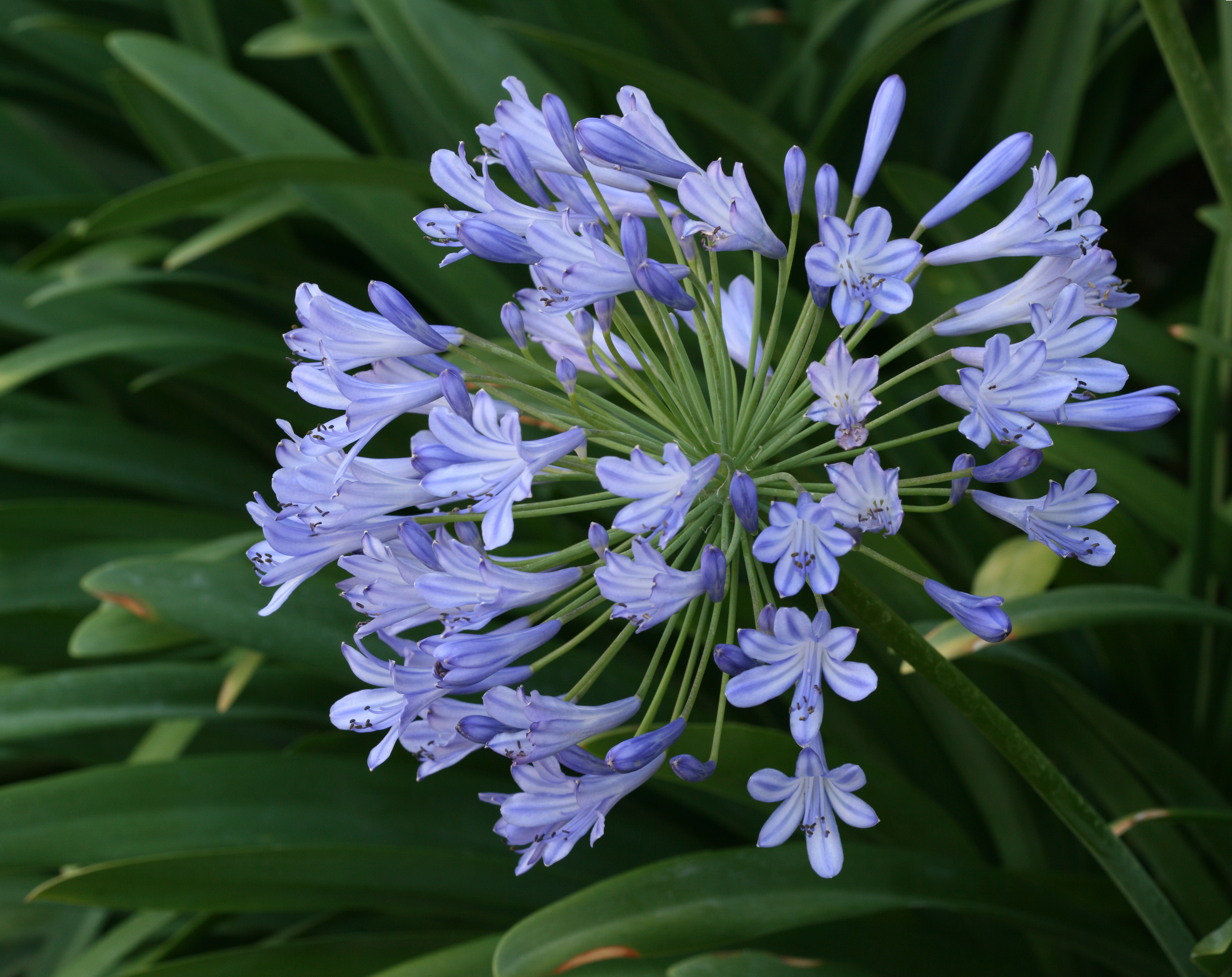
Agapanthus flower

Originating from South Africa, Agapanthus—specifically Agapanthus praecox and its cultivars—were brought to New Zealand and later became a popular and common invasive species garden plant.

== Garden appeal ==
Troops returning from the Second Boer War in the native range of this genus liked the plant, escalating its commonplace use in the early twentieth century. Agapanthus is often seen planted alongside fences in home gardens and framing driveway entrances. They also found lasting appeal at baches (holiday homes) in New Zealand, for the extreme hardiness, salt-tolerance and very low maintenance.

== Weed status ==
The plant has been listed on various weed registers since 1996, and is currently declared by the Department of Conservation to be an environmental weed. It is found on public land administered by DOC, including Kapiti Island.

A. praecox has been recognised for its invasiveness in the Auckland region since the 1990s. The former Auckland Regional Council (now subsumed into the Auckland Council) classed it as a surveillance plant pest in 2007. In the 2011–2016 Regional Pest Management Strategy the Bay of Plenty Regional Council classes it as a restricted pest plant.

There was an attempt made at adding A. praecox to the 2006 update of the National Pest Plant Accord (NPPA) but the application was declined. The 2011–2012 update of the NPPA attracted debate when it was again recommended for addition.

== See also ==
- Gardening in New Zealand
- Invasive species in New Zealand
