= Auckland Flower Show =

Austrailian flower and garden show held in 2008

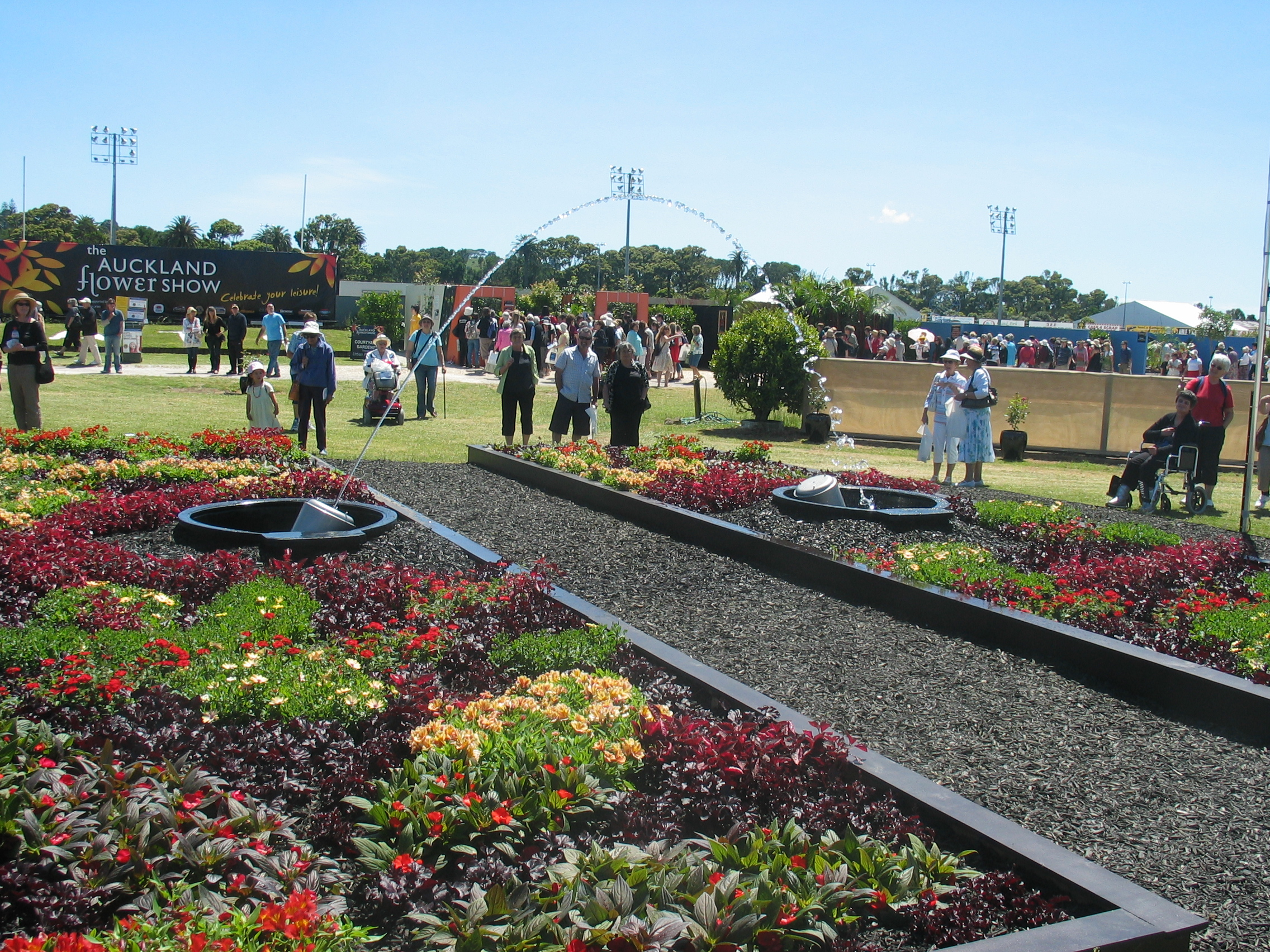
Water jets at the 2008 show

The Auckland Flower Show was a flower and garden show held in Alexandra Park in the suburb of Epsom, Auckland in November 2008.

Previously, the Ellerslie Flower Show was held at the same time of year in Auckland, and had been held every year since 1994 (except 1997). In November 2007, the organisers sold the name of the Ellerslie Flower Show and the use of their services to the Christchurch City Council, which intends holding future Ellerslie Flower Shows at Hagley Park in Christchurch.

On 2 December 2007, Auckland Flower Show Ltd announced that they would be continuing the tradition of the annual flower shows in Auckland with the Auckland Flower Show 2008, and on 28 February confirmed that for 2008 the event would be held in Alexandra Park from 20–23 November 2008.

The Auckland Regional Council and Manukau City Council considered funding a flower show to replace the Ellerslie Flower Show and compete with the Auckland Flower Show, but decided in May 2008 to drop investigations.

There were 31 garden displays at the 2008 Auckland Flower Show, as well as floral displays and trade stalls. The organisers were expecting 65,000 people to attend during the four-day event.

Although the organisers planned to follow up with another show, it has not eventuated.

== See also ==
- Gardening in New Zealand
