= Rex Forrester =

- Born: 8 November 1928
- Died: 31 August 2001 (aged 72)
- Occupations: Hunting and fishing specialist

Rex Forrester (8 November 1928 – 31 August 2001) was a recognised New Zealand hunting and fishing specialist. He was known for his deer culling, helicopter hunting, live deer capture, pig hunting and trout fishing within New Zealand and Australia. He was also an outdoor sports author who published nine books.

== Early life ==
Rex Forrester resided in Rotorua, within New Zealand's north island. He was employed by the Tourist and Publicity Sector of the New Zealand Tourism Department.

== Writing ==
Rex Forrester published the following hunting and fishing books:

- Hunter for Hire - Co-author with Neil Illingworth (1965)
- Hunting in New Zealand - Co-author with Neil Illingworth (1967)
- Rex Forrester's True Hunting Adventures (1980)
- The Chopper Boys: New Zealand's Helicopter Hunters (1983)
- Trout Fishing in New Zealand (1987)
- Helicopter Hunters (1988)
- A Hunter's Life (1997)
- The Chopper Boys and the Helicopter Hunters: New Zealand Hunting Classics (2002)
- True Hunting Adventures (2006)

== Tahr Hunting ==
In the late 1950s and early 1960s, the legendary story teller, author and hunting guide Rex Forrester, put tahr on the top of the list of big game animals that overseas trophy hunters came to New Zealand to hunt

== Rogers Hut ==
Rogers Hut is a heritage Site located in the Whirinaki Te Pua-a-Tāne Conservation Park. The hut, which is part of the Whirinaki track network was built by a team of deer cullers led by Rex Forrester. Rogers Hut attracts approximately 1500 people per year, and was named after Rex Forrester's first son.

== See also ==
- Helicopter-based hunting in Fiordland
