= Ellerslie Flower Show =

Annual garden show in New Zealand

Coordinates: 43.528°S 172.626°E

The Ellerslie International Flower Show was an annual garden show held in New Zealand. Previously held in the city of Auckland, the show moved to Christchurch at Hagley Park in 2008.

Attendance is several tens of thousands of people at each event during the five days in which it is open to the public. The show has been held every year since 1994, except 1997 and 2011 (when it was cancelled due to the Christchurch earthquake).

The first show was held in the Auckland suburb of Ellerslie at the Ellerslie Racecourse in 1994. The members of The Rotary Club of Auckland wanted to establish a unique fundraiser to raise money for local charities, so they decided to host an event modelled on the famous Chelsea Flower Show in England. As of 2007, it has distributed a total of $700,000 for charity.

In 1998, it was moved to Manurewa, South Auckland, where it was held at the Auckland Botanic Gardens until the final show November 2007.

In 2004, the Rotary Club of Auckland sold the business to EFS Charitable Trust and SMC Group Ltd which now operates the event, with the intention of providing support at a community level and to the horticultural industry.

On 19 November 2007, the organisers sold the name and their services to the Christchurch City Council for NZ$3 million. The show is worth $14 million to the regional economy each year. Auckland Regional Council chairman Mike Lee suggests that a new flower show will be organised in Auckland to replace the Ellerslie Flower Show. The initial show in Christchurch, held in March 2009, attracted 75,000 visitors. Attendance in 2010 was 55,000, the 2011 event was cancelled due to the Canterbury Earthquakes, 45,000 attended in 2012 (that year, the show experienced adverse weather conditions). 2013 attendance is not yet known, but the organisers think that attendance might be down compared to the previous year.

On 2 December 2007, Auckland Flower Show Ltd announced that they will be continuing the tradition of the annual flower shows in Auckland with the Auckland Flower Show 2008, but there was no follow-up to the initial event.

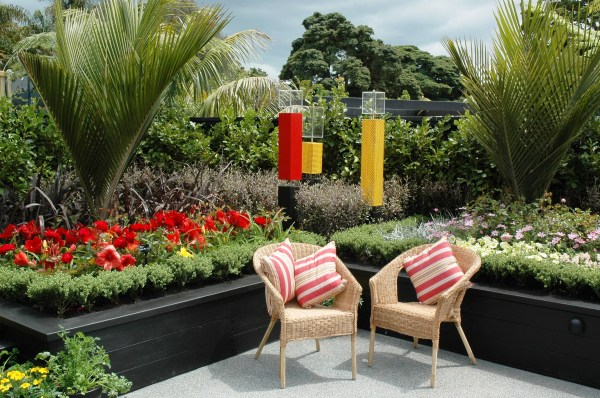

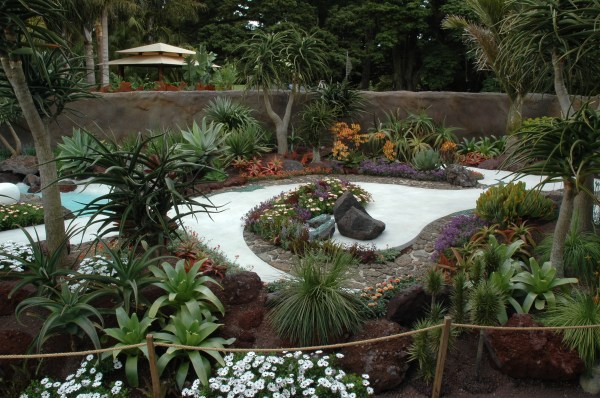

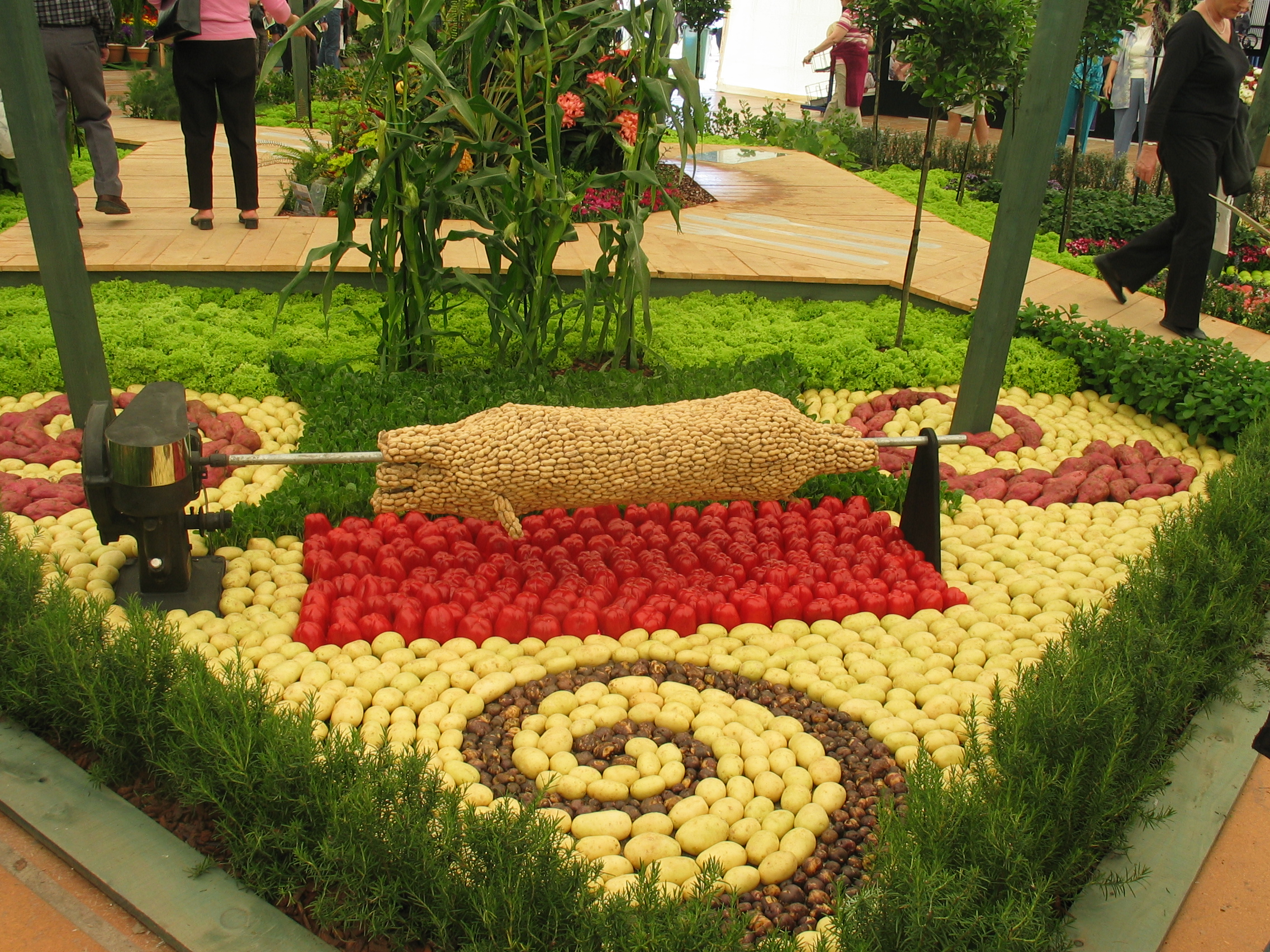

== See also ==
- Gardening in New Zealand
