= Old man's beard in New Zealand =

Spread of Clematis vitalba in New Zealand

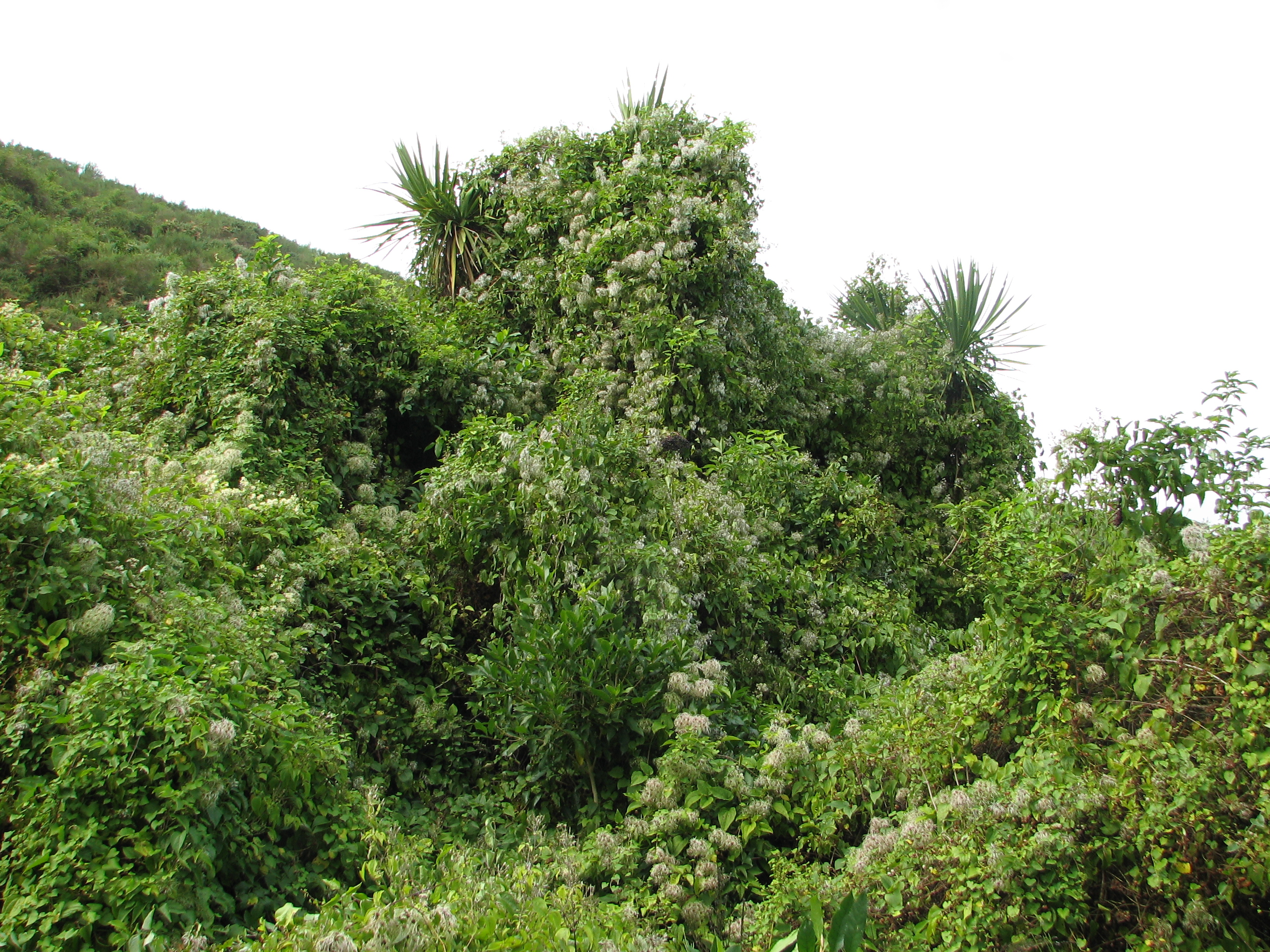
Old man's beard smothering a Cordyline australis (cabbage tree) on the Port Hills in Christchurch

Old man's beard (Clematis vitalba) is an invasive plant in New Zealand that affects indigenous biodiversity. It is declared an unwanted organism under the Biosecurity Act 1993 which means it cannot be sold, distributed or propagated.

== Spread ==
Old man's beard was introduced into New Zealand as an ornamental plant some time before 1922 and the Department of Conservation and other government organisations now spend millions of dollars on its control. The seeds are wind-borne on a fluffy boll and can remain on the vine over the winter months. The seeds are most likely to germinate on disturbed ground where the light level is more than 5% of full sunlight. It is more common outside undisturbed forests on forest and stream margins and forest gaps.

== Impact ==
Old man's beard is a climber that will smother established trees and forms a dense canopy that stops sunlight reaching the soil surface. This affects the health of the existing vegetation and prevents the germination of all other species.

== Control ==
Various methods are used to control the plant including mechanical removal, herbicides and biological control. Large vines can be cut at ground level and a herbicide gel applied to prevent sprouting. Trailing vines must be removed since they can re-sprout, and small plants can be uprooted. Biological control agents have been trialled.

A public service campaign highlighting the threat of old man's beard was carried out by the Department of Conservation in the 1980s using the British naturalist David Bellamy as the spokesperson.

== See also ==
- Invasive species in New Zealand
- Biodiversity of New Zealand
- Gardening in New Zealand
