= Canada goose in New Zealand =

Game bird in New Zealand

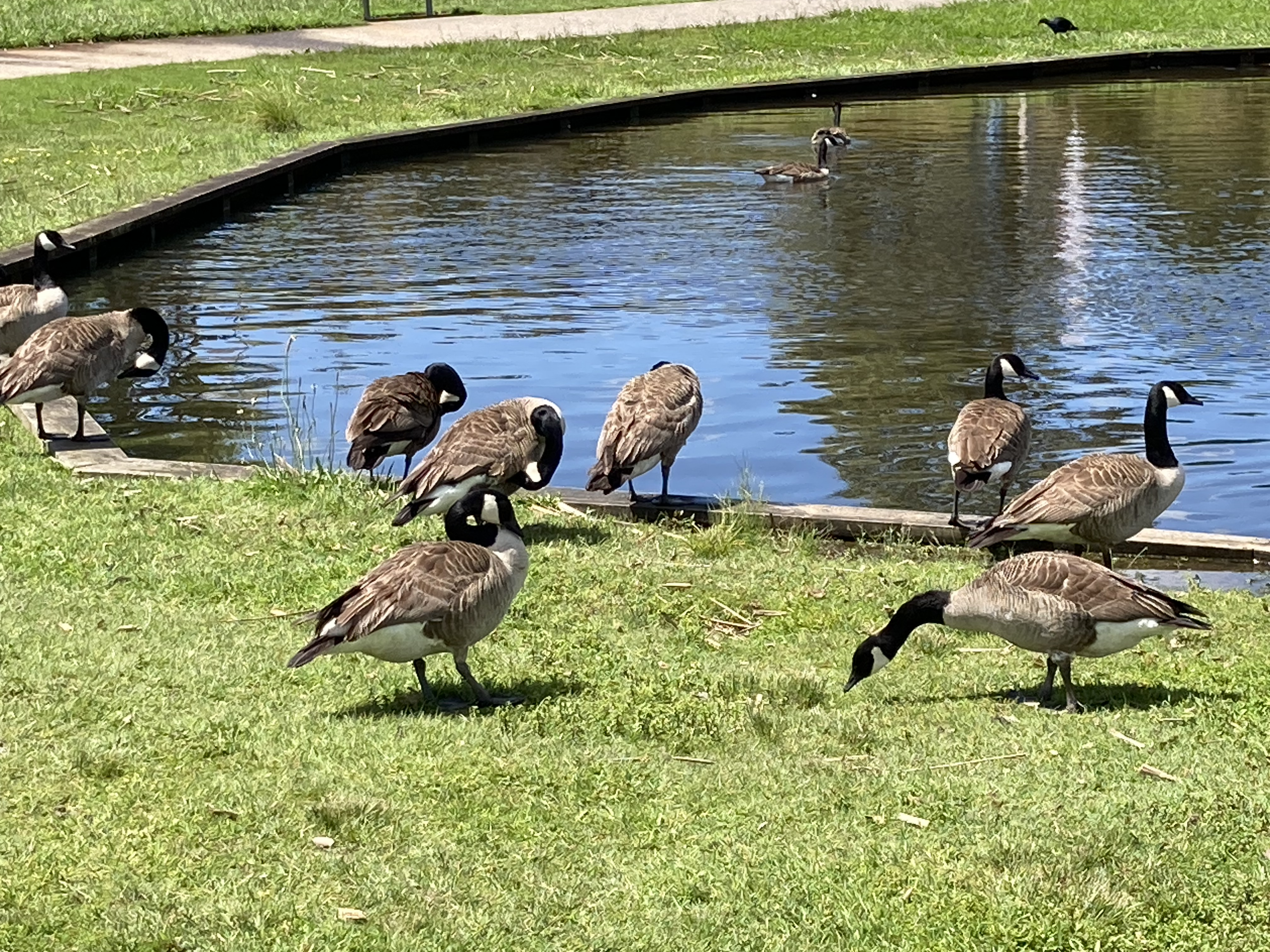
Various Canada geese at Lake Rotoroa, Hamilton

The Canada goose (Branta canadensis) was introduced to New Zealand as a game bird in 1905. They became problematic because of damage they cause to pastures and crops.

== History ==
Canada geese were introduced as a game bird into New Zealand in 1905. They were protected under the Wildlife Act of 1953 and the population was managed by Fish and Game New Zealand who culled excessive bird numbers. The number of birds increased and by 1996 they had reached an estimated population of 40,000 in the South Island. In 2011 the government removed the protection status allowing anyone to kill the birds.

In the lead-up to 2011, farmers felt that not enough was being done to control the population. They lobbied the government to have the designation changed so landowners could manage birds on their own properties. The then-conservation minister, Kate Wilkinson, changed its status, putting the birds in the same bracket as sparrows and pigeons. Fish and Game councils lost the authority to manage the species, and requirements for a shooting permit were dropped. An analysis of options prepared by Department of Conservation (DOC) considered that changing the status of Canada geese from 'Schedule 1' of the Wildlife Act 1953 (game birds) to 'Schedule 5' (not protected) would provide the best match against the overall objectives of a) ensuring landowners and managers do not bear the unacceptable costs from Canada goose impacts, b) ensure that Canada geese do not pose an unacceptable risk to aviation safety, and c) maximising recreational hunting opportunities (subject to (a) and (b) being met).

Fish and Game and hunters opposed the change, labeling the move 'a costly own goal' and later 'one of the most bizarre government decisions in the history of managed gamebird hunting in New Zealand'. Controversy about management has dated from at least 2006 when it was reported that farmers wanted lower numbers and Fish & Game wanted more financial support from farmers to support control efforts.

== Effects ==
Canada geese are often seen in pastures and in the braided river valleys of the South Island and damage to pastures was reported as early as 1925. They affect pastures by competing for food with the farmed animals and by leaving droppings. The birds may also be responsible for some damage to crops.

== See also ==
- Invasive species in New Zealand
- Hunting in New Zealand
- Agriculture in New Zealand
