= New Zealand Game Industry Board =

The New Zealand Game Industry Board is a statutory marketing authority established by regulations made under the Primary Products Marketing Act 1953. The Board collects information about the game industry and uses this information to help its members. Specific information which is collected includes data about industry production and export volumes and prices, support for research into the processing area, development of industry grading standards and product specifications and, in particular, market research, and strategy development and targeted promotions. With effect from 1 October 2002, Deer Industry New Zealand is the operating name of the Game Industry Board. Deer Industry New Zealand operates under regulations that came into force in 2004.

== Structure ==
The Board representation comprises four appointees nominated by the New Zealand Deer Farmers' Association, three nominated by the New Zealand Deer Industry Association, one of whom represents velvet processors, and one government nominee. The Game Industry Board has a Research Trust.

== See also ==
- Agriculture in New Zealand
- Hunting in New Zealand
