= Gardening in Spain =

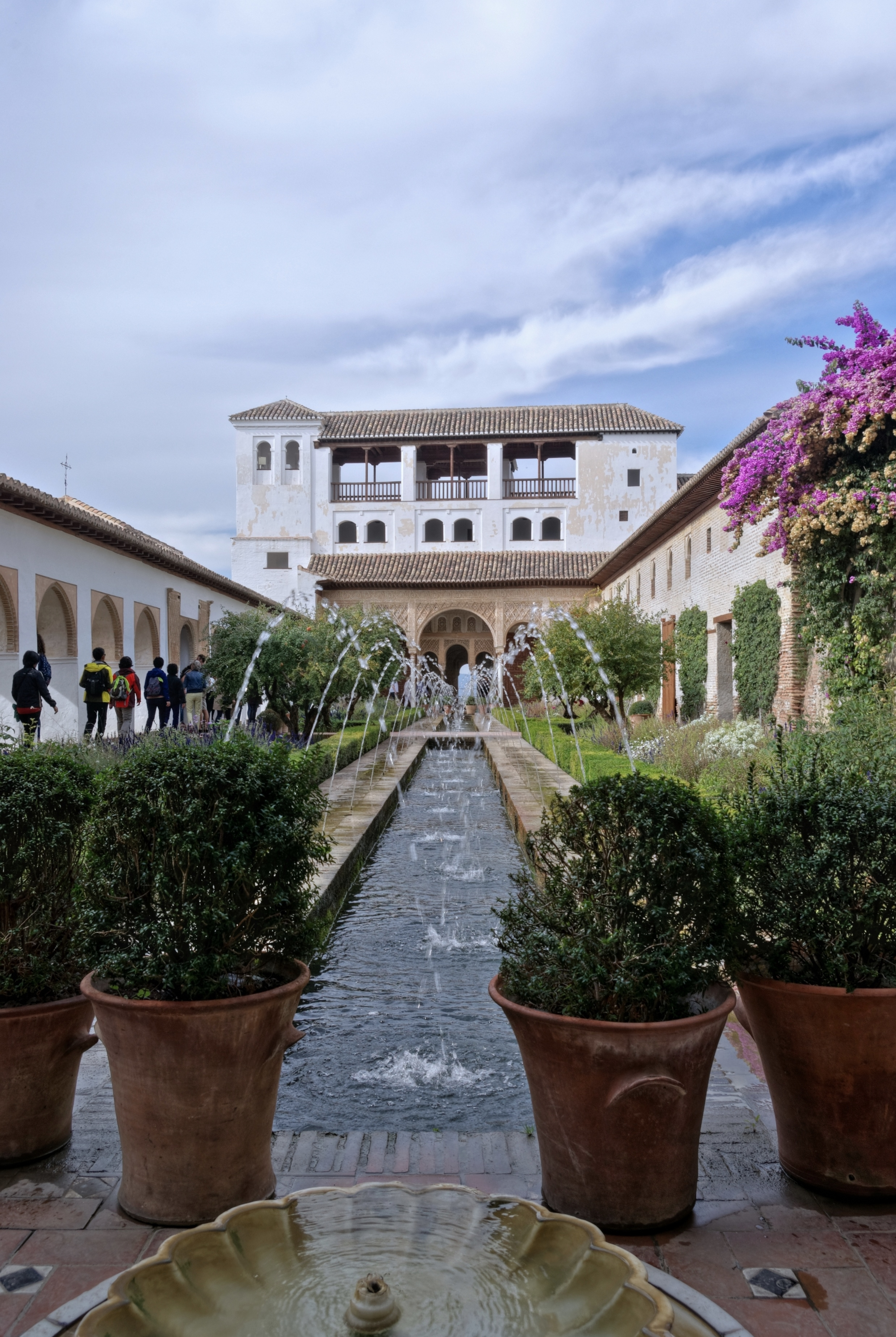
Garden of the Generalife, Granada.

Gardening in Spain reflects the different styles of Spanish art, including influences from Roman, Islamic, Italian, French, and English gardens. Modern Spanish gardening emphasize gardens and their surroundings, focusing heavily on both urban horticulture and landscape architecture.

Spanish gardens are affected by the climate and orography of Spain. The ground in Spain is generally drier than in its neighboring countries of Portugal and France. High levels of summer solar radiation in Spain have led to the creation of smaller, indoor gardens.

There are many historical parks and gardens in Spain. The first Spanish botanical garden was created near Valencia in 1633. Many new gardens with Islamic influences were created during the Renaissance. Up until the 19th century, the majority of gardens were promoted by the royalty and the aristocracy. After that, social changes facilitated the creation of parks and public gardens for the use and enjoyment of all citizens. Urban gardening evolved during the 20th century, as well as ecological awareness, which has led to the creation of new parks around Spain.

== Influences ==
=== Roman period ===
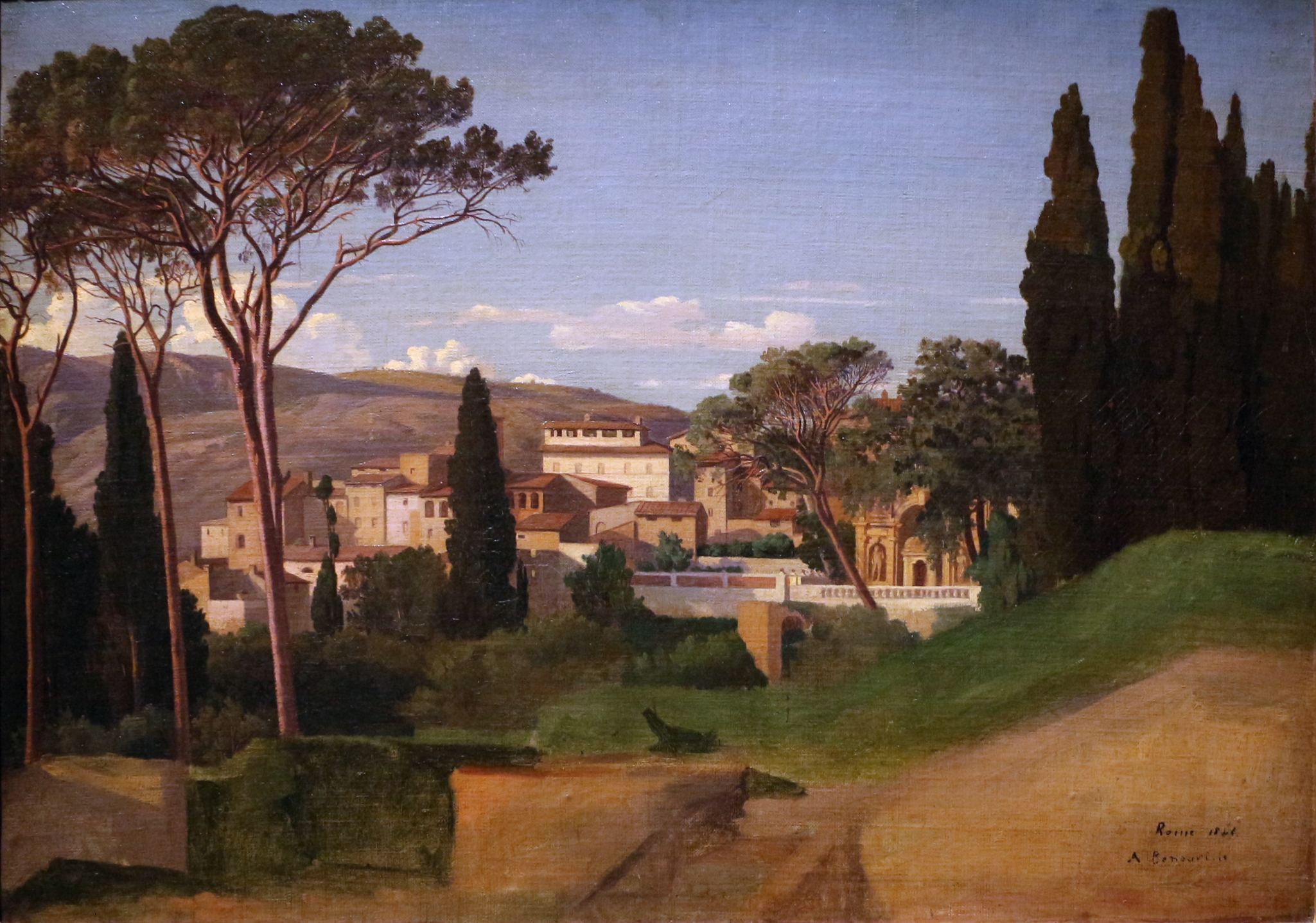
Modern vision of a Roman villa.

Gardening in Spain began during the Roman period. Ancient Rome was very advanced in regards to its architecture and engineering, and their aqueducts helped irrigate gardens in remote areas. Because of this, they were able to create swimming pools and lakes, which emphasized the beauty of the gardens. The Romans also used topiary in their gardens.

Roman gardens were linked to the domus, the home of the Roman upper class. The entrances of these homes were typically decorated with sculptures and led to gardens containing Mediterranean vegetation. This model also arose the villa, a rustic farm that generally served to accommodate middle-class civilians. There were also urban gardens were organized around an atrium and served as a communal area for all the social classes. The center of atriums had a lake decorated with mosaics, vases, or statues, and walls decorated with frescos.

Roman gardens usually had structural and architectural elements such as porticos, arches, columns, exedras, swimming pools, wooden kiosks, pergolas, arbours, and even artificial grottos (nymphaea). Water ran in abundance through channels and pilones, sometimes with small jets.

Aside from Roman domūs and villas, there were several other urban areas with greenery, such as gymnasiums and theatres. An example is the porticus post scaenam of the Theatre of Mérida, which had a garden, sculptures, and a sundial.

=== Islamic period ===
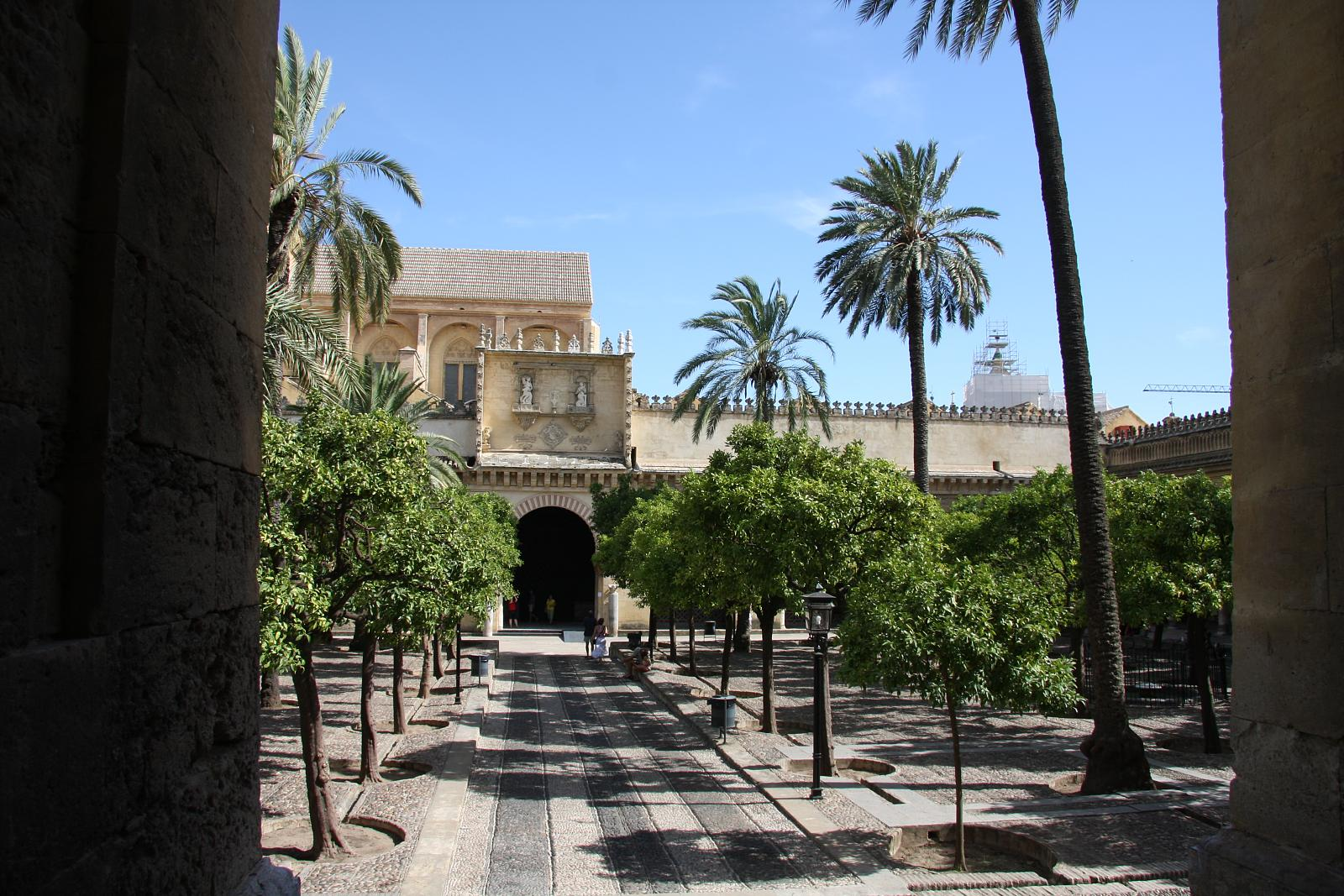
Playground of the Naranjos, Mosque of Córdoba.

Islamic culture in Spain greatly influenced Spanish gardening. After conquering the peninsula, the Umayyad Caliphate established many gardens, especially in its capital city of Córdoba. Islamic gardens had a lot of shade, as such gardens were usually located in arid regions. They usually had a fountain in the middle, surrounded by a walkway and greenery.

=== Renaissance period ===
During the Renaissance, topiary grew in popularity, and gardens were filled with sculptures from Italy and Flanders. The Duke of Alba's estate had a large private Flemish garden with topiary, waterworks, and grottoes. Myrtles and lemon and orange trees were also often used in Renaissance gardens.

Philip II also greatly influenced Spanish gardening. He created many new gardens, and imported several foreign plants such as the English Elm tree.

== Common plants ==
=== Trees ===
- Cypress
- Lemon
- Orange

=== Plants ===
- Balsam
- Sweet basil
- Carnation
- Honeysuckle
- Ivy
- Jasmine
- Spurge Laurel
- Marvel of Peru
- Passion Flower
- Ranunculus
- Rose Bushes

=== Rare trees ===
- Magnolia grandiflora

== See also ==
- Spanish garden
- Parks and gardens of Barcelona
- Gardening in Australia
- Gardening in New Zealand
- Gardening in Scotland

== Bibliography ==
- AA.VV. (2001). Gaudí. Hàbitat, natura i cosmos (in Catalan). Barcelona: Ed. Lunwerg. ISBN 84-7782-799-0.
- Antonio, Trinidad de (1989). El siglo XVII español. Madrid: Historia 16.
- Añón Feliú, Carmen; Luengo, Mónica (2003). Jardines de España. Madrid: Lunwerg. ISBN 84-9785-006-8.
- Arnaldo, Javier (1989). El movimiento romántico. Madrid: Historia 16.
- Azcárate Ristori, José María de; Pérez Sánchez, Alfonso Emilio; Ramírez Domínguez, Juan Antonio (1983). Historia del Arte. Madrid: Anaya. ISBN 84-207-1408-9.
- Bassegoda i Nonell, Joan (1989). El gran Gaudí. Sabadell: Ausa. ISBN 84-86329-44-2.
- Bassegoda i Nonell, Joan (2002). Gaudí o espacio, luz y equilibrio. Madrid: Criterio. ISBN 84-95437-10-4.
- Bazin, Germain (1990). Historia del jardín. Barcelona: Plaza & Janés. ISBN 84-01-60474-5.
- Bojstad, Anneli (2011). Jardines mágicos de España. Barcelona: Blume. ISBN 978-84-9801-557-7.
- Buttlar, Adrian von; Soto Caba, Victoria (1993). Jardines del clasicismo y el romanticismo. El jardín paisajista. Madrid: Nerea. ISBN 84-86763-76-2.
- Casa Valdés, María Teresa de Ozores y Saavedra, marquesa de (1973). Jardines de España. Madrid: Aguilar. ISBN 84-03-80003-7.
- Chilvers, Ian (2007). Diccionario de arte. Madrid: Alianza Editorial. ISBN 978-84-206-6170-4.
- Crespo Díez, Manuel; Herrán Martínez, José Ignacio; Puente Aparicio, María Jesús (2006). El Monasterio Cisterciense de Santa María de Matallana. (Villalba de los Alcores, Valladolid). Salamanca: Diputación de Valladolid. ISBN 84-7852-190-9.
- Eco, Umberto (2004). Historia de la belleza. Barcelona: Lumen. ISBN 84-264-1468-0.
- Fernández Arenas, José (1988). Arte efímero y espacio estético. Barcelona: Anthropos. ISBN 84-7658-078-9.
- Garrut, Josep Maria (1976). L'Exposició Universal de Barcelona de 1888 (in Catalan). Barcelona: Ajuntament de Barcelona, Delegació de Cultura. ISBN 84-500-1498-0.
- Hansmann, Wilfried; Rabanal Yus, Aurora (1989). Jardines del Renacimiento y el Barroco. Madrid: Nerea. ISBN 84-86763-27-4.
- Jiménez, Alfonso (1989). El arte islámico. Madrid: Historia 16.
- Jiménez, Ana (2001). Jardines de España. Madrid: Rueda. ISBN 84-87507-85-9.
- Kluckert, Ehrenfried (2007). Grandes jardines de Europa. Colonia: Ullmann. ISBN 978-3-8331-6225-1.
- Marías, Julián (2001). Historia de la filosofía. Madrid: Alianza Editorial. ISBN 84-206-8183-0.
- Martínez Muñoz, Amalia (2001). Arte y arquitectura del siglo XX. Vol. II: La institucionalización de las vanguardias. Ed. Montesinos. ISBN 84-95580-14-4.
- Páez de la Cadena, Francisco (1998). Historia de los estilos en jardinería. Madrid: Istmo. ISBN 84-7090-127-3.
- Rodríguez Ruiz, Delfín (1993). La arquitectura del siglo XX. Madrid: Historia 16, vol. 47.
- Tovar Martín, Virginia (1989). El siglo XVIII español. Madrid: Historia 16, vol.34.
