= Helicopter-based hunting in Fiordland =

Strategy for managing invasive species in remote New Zealand

Helicopter hunting of deer has occurred in the Fiordland area of New Zealand since the 1960s. As long ago as the 1920s, introduced European deer plagued the Fiordland National Park to the detriment of the native New Zealand flora and fauna. The New Zealand government placed a bounty on the deer, paying local hunters for each animal removed from the park. With the market for venison and deerskin, by the 1960s this had proved a lucrative enough business for several hunters to invest in helicopters, to travel fast through the rugged landscape.

Deer populations plummeted as a result, and competition among hunters grew more fierce. Accusations of sabotage and the flouting of rules became common in this unregulated industry. Combined with a growing farm-raised deer industry, and the impact of by-kill due to 1080 poison, the helicopter hunting market declined steeply. However, its legacy lives on, as former hunting helicopters these days carry tourists and hunters into the New Zealand wilderness.

== Methods of capture ==
One method of capturing feral deer involved flying beside the fleeing deer and casting a capture net over the deer. Immediately afterwards a crew member would jump from the helicopter and tie and place the deer into "livey bags" for carrying out to the waiting farmers.

== History ==
European settlers imported red deer for sport into New Zealand and released them into the forests starting in 1851, along with many other introduced animals. The environment proved perfect for a population explosion, the result being widespread damage both to vegetation and to farmers' grazing. The New Zealand government, in order to solve the problem, paid deer cullers a bounty per deer-tail in an attempt to control deer numbers, starting in the 1930s. Until the early 1950s, the sale of deer hides recovered by the government hunters supposedly financed the wildlife culling operations. This ceased when the market collapsed. Then Germany began to purchase exported New Zealand venison, and the deer market hunting industry commenced.

Hunters used horses and jet boats to transport deer back to game depots for sale. The typical “kiwi bloke” “do-it-yourself” identity created and developed this self-made industry. (Compare "Southern man".) The next stage of development saw the introduction of helicopters, used for carrying deer back to awaiting trucks positioned at remote road ends, for couriering to the venison-processing factories. This was pioneered by Tim Wallis in 1965. The technique of shooting deer from helicopters with doors removed became perfected with thanks to Rex Forrester, a recognised New Zealand hunting and fishing specialist.

By 1970, more than sixty helicopters were being used for deer hunting and recovery. A two hundred deer kill count counted as a highly productive day, worth $17,000, though more crews averaged 100 kills. In 1973, venison prices soared further, resulting in increased illegal yet profitable helicopter hunts and reports of shootings, arson, sabotage, and fist fights. The RNZAF sent two Iroquois helicopters to prevent poaching and trespassing in what became known as the "Helicopter Wars" or "Deer Wars".

=== Methods of in air transport ===
The crew of the “flying hunter” helicopter consisted of 3 men: pilot, shooter and knife hand. A larger helicopter would support this “flying hunter” helicopter: the bigger machine would transport the shot deer, suspended by a hook, under that helicopter; and also supply fuel to the hunter-unit.

Hunters had their bases in remote wilderness areas, either in huts, or living on moored vessels in the Fiordland sounds, used as helicopter pads.

=== Turn to deer farming ===
With the strong demand for “organic venison” from a pure environment, and dwindling population of wild deer, some deer hunters saw advantages in starting deer farming. Initially they captured fawns, hand-raised them and domesticated them: the dawn of deer farming occurred in New Zealand in the 1970s. When compared to farming cattle or sheep, deer farming proved a more than viable operation - it had tax advantages too.

As the skills of the hunters increased, the deer became more elusive, the wild deer population declined, demand for breeding stock for deer farms grew, and live-deer prices rose to $3,500 per beast. This live deer hunting industry, unique to New Zealand, became a way of life and a specialised culture. Accidents, injuries, helicopter crashes and, over 80 fatalities occurred increasingly common, as the hunters were often untrained and untrained with firearms and tranquillisers, though lucrative returns kept the hunters returning despite the danger.

The New Zealand government intervened through legislation, policing and administration; the deer hunters considered this as harassment to their livelihood. There resulted in a difference in what the authorities and the deer hunters considered “fair play”. Changing tax laws, and deer farms breeding their own stock, bought about the end of this era. The deer now repopulate the forest.

== See also ==
- Rex Forrester
- Agriculture in New Zealand
- 1080 usage in New Zealand
- Hunting in New Zealand

== Sources ==
- Rex Forrester, True Hunting Adventures
- Rex Forrester, The Chopper Boys
- Rex Forrester, The Helicopter Hunters
- Mike Bennett, The Venison Hunters
