= Wild Animal Control Act 1977 =

Act of Parliament in New Zealand

New Zealand Parliament
- Long title: An Act to make better provision for the control of harmful species of introduced wild animals and the means of regulating the operations of recreational and commercial hunters, including wild animal recovery hunting using aircraft, so as to achieve concerted action and effective wild animal control, and to consolidate and amend the Noxious Animals Act 1956.
- Territorial extent: New Zealand
- Royal assent: 23 December 1977
- Commenced: 23 December 1977

Repeals
- Noxious Animals Act 1956; Noxious Animals Amendment Act 1962; Noxious Animals Amendment Act 1967
- Status: Current legislation

The Wild Animal Control Act 1977 is a current Act of Parliament in New Zealand. It is administered by the Department of Conservation.

Part 3 of the Act establishes recreational hunting areas (RHAs). If the wild animal species are not kept in check, commercial hunting is allowed. At present the following RHAs have been established:

- North Island:
  - Kaweka (East Coast/Hawkes Bay)
  - Kaimanawa (Tongariro/Taupo)
  - North Pureora Conservation Park (Waikato)
  - Haurangi (Wellington)
- South Island
  - Blue Mountains - (Southland)
  - Greenstone/Caples - beside Lake Wakatipu (Otago)
  - Lake Sumner - Nina, Doubtful Range, North Hurunui and Hurunui restricted hunting block (Canterbury)
  - Oxford - Mt Oxford and Mt Thomas forest parks (Canterbury)

== See also ==
- Hunting in New Zealand
- Conservation in New Zealand
