= Didymo in New Zealand =

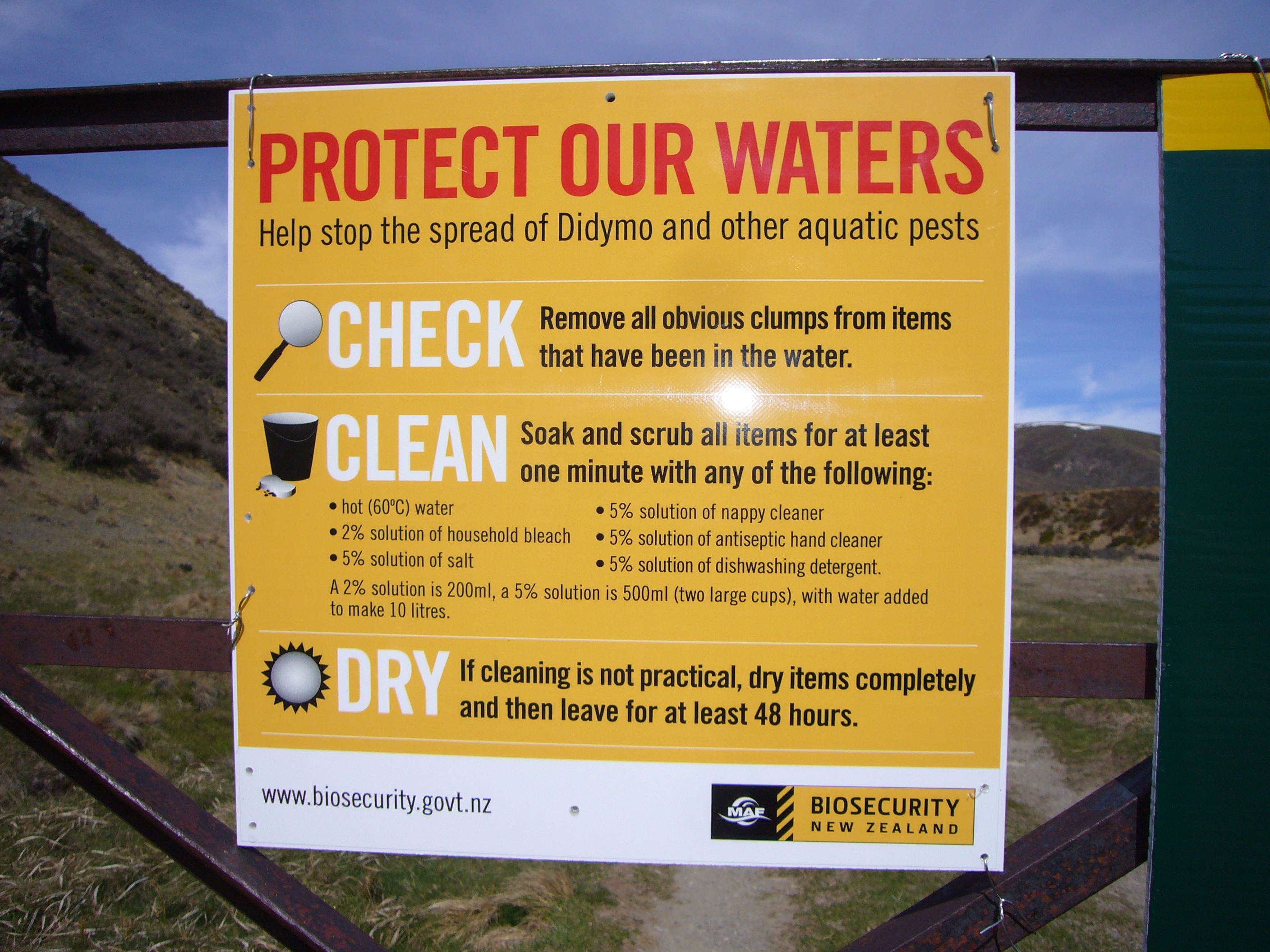
A didymo information sign on a gate in Canterbury, New Zealand.

In 2004 Didymosphenia geminata, a diatom commonly known as didymo or rock snot, was discovered in New Zealand, the first time it was found in the Southern Hemisphere. To restrict its spread, the whole of the South Island of New Zealand was declared a controlled area in December 2005. All items, such as boats, fishing gear, clothing, and vehicles, that have been in a stream, river or lake, must be cleaned before they enter another waterway. Biosecurity New Zealand working with Environment Southland, AgriQuality and Fish and Game New Zealand launched an extensive public awareness campaign to encourage river users to clean their equipment after use in affected waterways. This campaign was highly successful, with 99% of freshwater users surveyed in 2008 in the South Island being aware of didymo.

== Adverse effects ==
Didymo can have a notable impact on the insects that are a food source for many species of fish. It can form massive algal blooms. It makes riverbeds slippery posing a danger to waders and swimmers. Didymo blooms also pose a hazard for: hydroelectric power generation, irrigation and recreational water usage. Didymo clogs domestic drinking water filters.

== Spread ==
In October 2004, an unusual algal growth was found in the lower Waiau River in Southland. The National Institute of Water and Atmospheric Research identified the algae as Didymosphenia geminata and confirmed that it is New Zealand's first documented detection.

In October 2005, populations of didymo were discovered in the Hāwea, Buller, Ōreti and Upper Clutha rivers. Delimiting testing is being undertaken in North Island waterways and other South Island river systems to find out how far didymo has spread in New Zealand.

In October 2007, dead didymo cells were found in routine water samples from the Whanganui, Tongariro, Whakapapa rivers, and the Mangatepopo Stream in the central North Island, with MAF suspecting further contamination.

In October 2009, didymo was detected in the Upper Rangitata River in Canterbury. The Upper Rangitata River is known as one of the most important braided river habitats for the endangered black-fronted tern, the wrybill and the endangered upland longjawed galaxias.

In February 2010, didymo was detected in the Waimakariri River.

In May 2010, didymo was detected in the Riuwaka River, the Pearse River and the Maruia River in the Nelson-Tasman region in the top of the South Island.

== Preventing the spread ==
The following methods are recommended by MAF Biosecurity New Zealand to prevent the spread of didymo in New Zealand:

Check: Before leaving the river, remove all obvious clumps of algae and look for hidden clumps. Leave them at the site. If you find clumps later don't wash them down the drain, treat them with the approved methods below, dry them and put them in a rubbish bin.

Clean: Soak and scrub all items for at least one minute in either hot (60°C) water, a 2% solution of household bleach or a 5% solution of salt, antiseptic hand cleaner or dishwashing detergent.

Dry: If cleaning is not practical (e.g. livestock, pets), after the item is completely dry wait an additional 48 hours before contact or use in any other waterway.

== See also ==
- Invasive species in New Zealand
- Conservation in New Zealand
