= Gisborne Botanical Gardens =

Public garden in Gisborne, New Zealand

Coordinates: 38.6569°S 178.0214°E

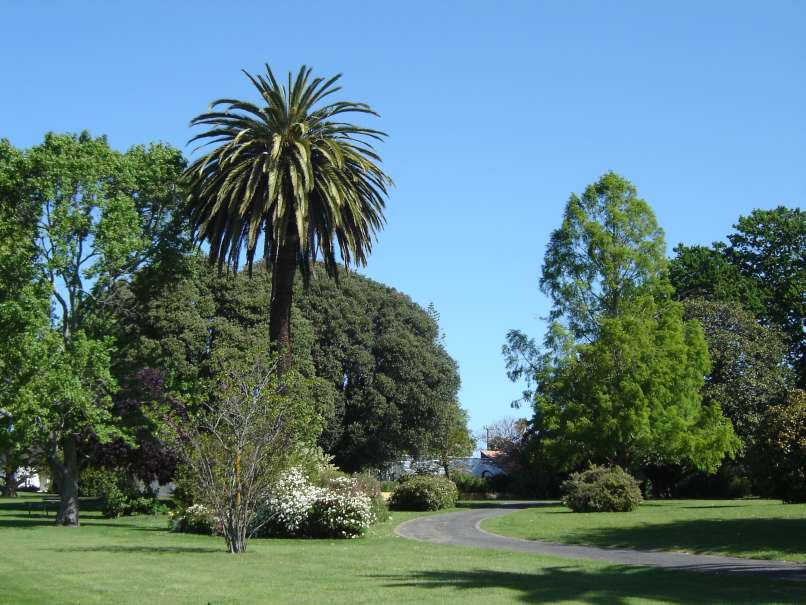

Gisborne Botanical Gardens is a public garden in Gisborne, New Zealand, that dates back to 1874. The Gisborne Botanical Gardens nowadays occupy 5.1 hectares (0.051 km^{2}) between Aberdeen Road and the Taruheru River. There are still many trees remaining from the early period.

There is also a Gisborne botanic garden in the town of Gisborne, Australia.

== History ==
The Botanical Gardens is Gisborne's oldest reserve. It was set aside in 1874 as a public garden. In that year a recreational reserve of 2.55 hectares (0.0255 km^{2}) was created, just outside the city boundary beside Taruheru River. The site developed into Gisborne's first recreation reserve, where cricket was played, until 1901, when Victoria Domain became the home for cricket.

Between 1915 and 1920 an area of native bush was planted.

By the 1960s the poplars which were planted in the early days of the gardens were mature. The row of trees along the river front was known as Poplar Avenue. The Botanical Gardens was developed as formal Botanical Gardens by this time, with ornate grand entrance gates and wide pathways and rows of flower beds. During the late 1960s the park was managed more as a park.

In 1972 a “free flying” aviary was constructed. During the 1970s the Gardens were shifting to a 'Botanic Garden' again, rather than a park as Council had decided in the 1960s.

In 1978 Mr and Mrs J.B. Greig bequeathed their Cacti collection to Council. A glass house was built in the Botanical Gardens to provide space for this collection.

In 1994 the Gisborne District Council adopted the concept of developing three sister gardens, in relation to the sister cities of Gisborne around the Pacific Rim.

Nowadays the Gisborne District Council, the Friends of the Botanical Gardens and the Gisborne Sister Cities Committee are working to improve and develop the Botanical Gardens.

== Plant collections ==
There are three so called sister city gardens:

- Australian garden – the first “sister city garden”, commenced in 1997, to honour the relation with Gisborne, Victoria.
- Japanese garden – the garden that is inspired by the relation with Nonoichi, Ishikawa.
- Palm Desert garden – for the third sister city, Palm Desert, California. This garden also holds the Cacti Collection (partly in the Glasshouse). This presentation is part of a collection bequeathed to the city by the late Mr & Mrs J. B. Greig in 1978.

Other gardens include:

- New Zealand Native Bush garden
- Riverside garden

== Works of art ==
There are some art works, for instance 'Desert Haiku' - a gift from the people of Palm Desert. It was created by Michael Watling in 2001. The andesite boulders from Te Puke represent the mountains around Palm Desert. The composition reflects Gisborne's connection to Japan. The stones take the classic haiku form of five, seven, five.

== Trees ==
Some important trees in the Gardens are:

- Quercus palustris - the pin oak from south east Canada and eastern USA.
- Quercus robur - the common oak from Europe.
- Platanus acerifolia - the London plane from Europe.
- Ginkgo biloba - the maidenhair tree from China.
- Ulmus carpinifolia var. variegata or Ulmus minor subsp. minor - the smooth-leaved elm
- Cedrus atlantica var. glauca - the blue Atlas cedar
- Liriodendron tulipifera - the tulip tree
- Araucaria bidwillii - the bunya bunya from Queensland
- Araucaria cookii or Araucaria columnaris- Captain Cook's pine from New Caledonia
- Tilia x europaea - the Common, or European lime
