= Bason Botanic Gardens =

Botanical garden in Whanganui, New Zealand

Coordinates: 39.8829°S 174.9514°E

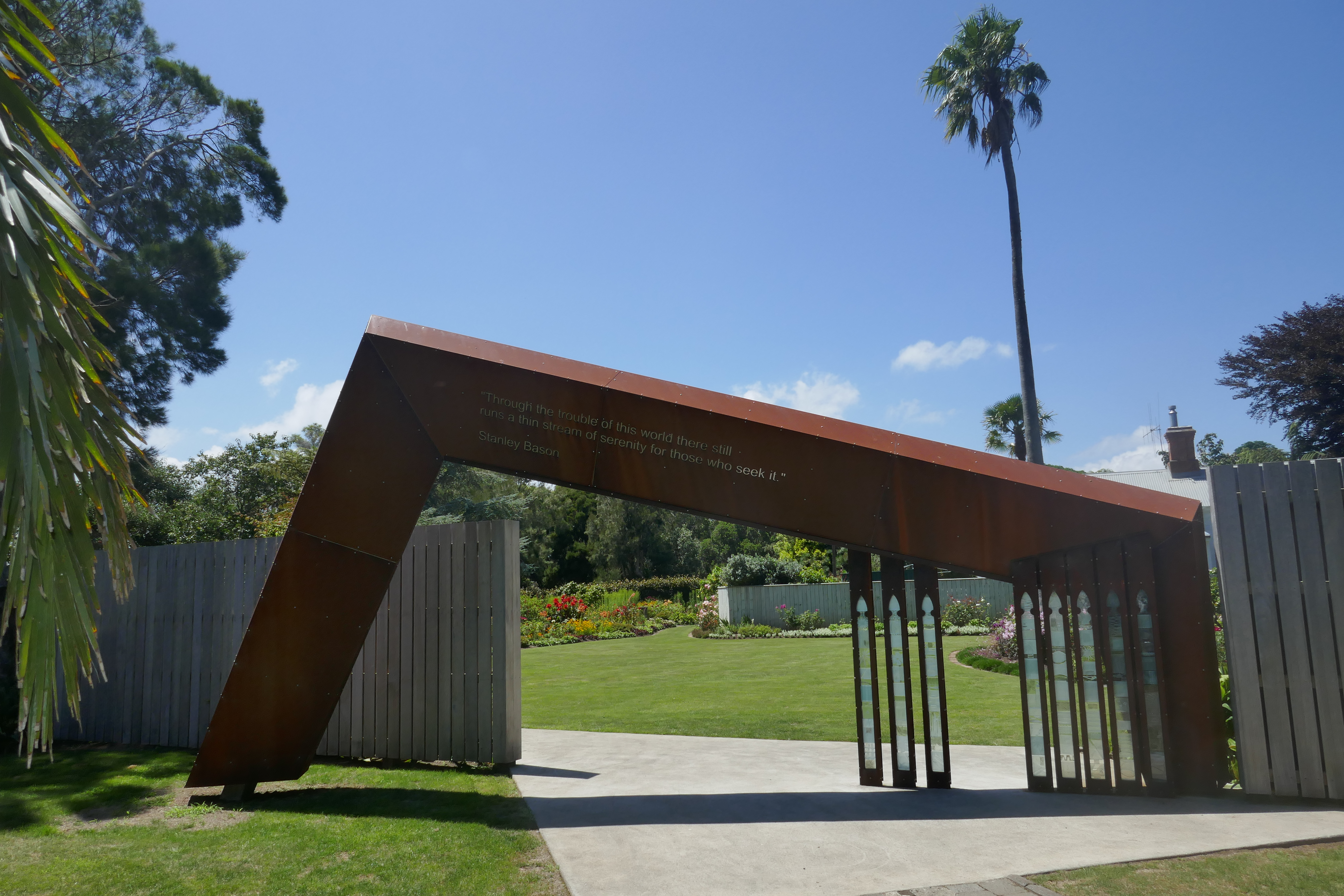
Entrance to Homestead garden

Bason Botanic Gardens are located in Whanganui in the Manawatū District of New Zealand. They have been rated as a Garden of Significance by the New Zealand Gardens Trust and offer six themed areas, including one of the most extensive public-garden orchid collections in the country, and the conservatory architecture is considered unique. Much of the development work is conducted by the Bason Botanic Gardens Trust, which collaborates with the City Council.

== Geography ==
Bason Botanic Gardens are located on the Central West coast of New Zealand's North Island, 8 kilometres (5.0 mi) northwest from Whanganui. They are set on 25 hectares (62 acres) in a relatively frost-free environment. Bushy Park Forest Reserve is nearby.

== History ==
Founded in 1966, Stanley and Blanche Bason gave their farm to the city council for the purpose of creating a botanical reserve,. The main road work and the damming of Mowhanau stream took place in 1971. The garden was developed between 1980 and 2000. The Bason Botanic Gardens Trust was formed in 1982 and consists of the Board as well as members of Friends of the Bason. The gardens were given to the residents of Wanganui by Stanley and Blanche Bason in 1996. The New Zealand Gardens Trust honoured Bason Botanic with the distinction of being a "Garden of Regional Significance" in 2004, and with being a "Garden of Significance" in 2008.

== Architecture ==
The conservatories were constructed from the recycled bricks from two demolished Wanganui picture theatres. Landscape architect Tony Jackman, the first President of the New Zealand Institute of Landscape Architects, designed most of the buildings.

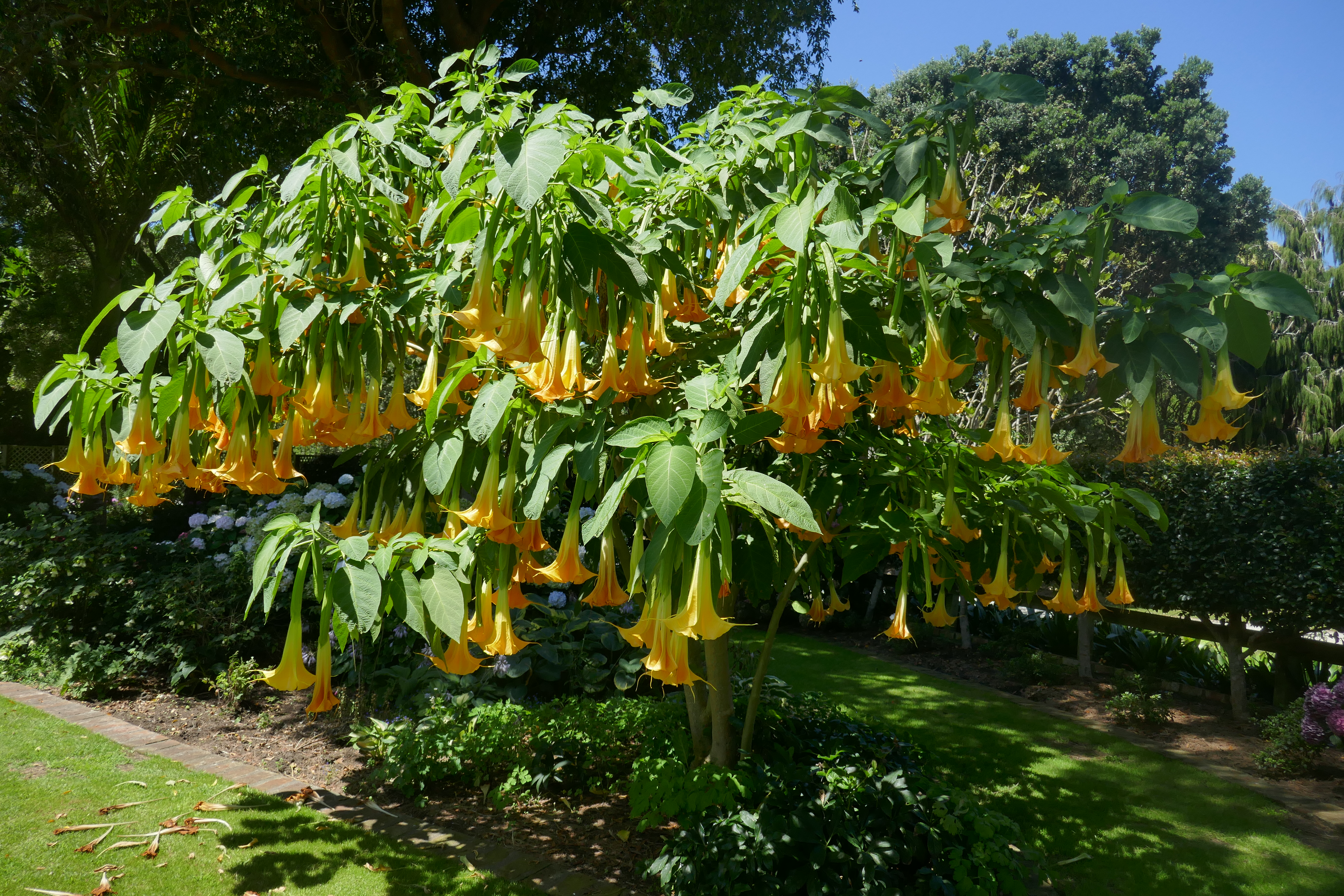
Brugmansia blooming in the Homestead garden

== Flora ==
The gardens are divided into several areas: the Conifer Arboretum, Dress Circle, Millennium Hill, Native Bush and Wetlands, Lakeside Flats and the Woodlands area. Flora includes camellias, daffodils, magnolias, Norfolk Island pine, and roses. A Mediterranean garden includes Aeonium, Aloe, Agave, Euphorbia and Echium. The subtropical section of the garden includes the aloes and phoenix palms. The conservatories contain tropical plants, begonias and orchids of national importance. A section of the gardens includes maturing revegetation while a bank contains native Hebes.
