= Painted apple moth in New Zealand =

Invasive moth species in New Zealand

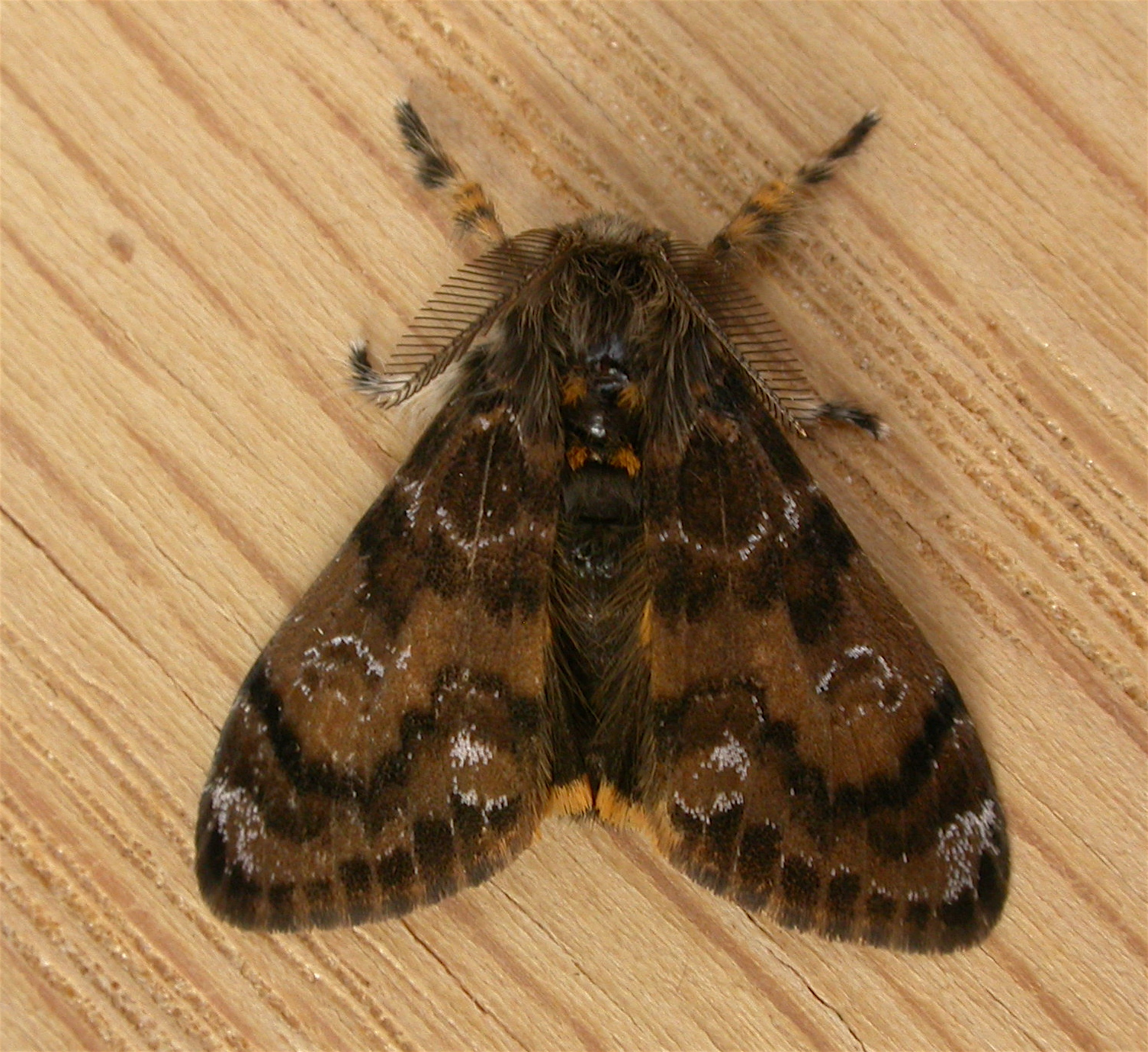
Painted apple moth

The painted apple moth (Teia anartoides or Orgyia anartoides) is an invasive species that was eradicated from New Zealand.

The moth is a native to Australia but in May 1999 it was found in Glendene, Auckland. A controversial spray programme was carried out to eradicate the moth.

== See also ==
- Pesticides in New Zealand
