= James Beard Foundation Award: 2020s =

The James Beard Foundation Awards are annual awards presented by the James Beard Foundation to recognize culinary professionals in the United States. The awards recognize chefs, restaurateurs, authors and journalists each year, and are generally scheduled around James Beard's May birthday.

The foundation also awards annually since 1998 the designation of America's Classic for local independently-owned restaurants that reflect the character of the community.

== 2020 awards ==
The 2020 chef and restaurant awards were canceled, due to the COVID-19 pandemic. The book and media awards were announced online on May 27, 2020. A virtual event was broadcast from Chicago on September 25, 2020.

=== Lifetime Achievement and Humanitarian Award ===
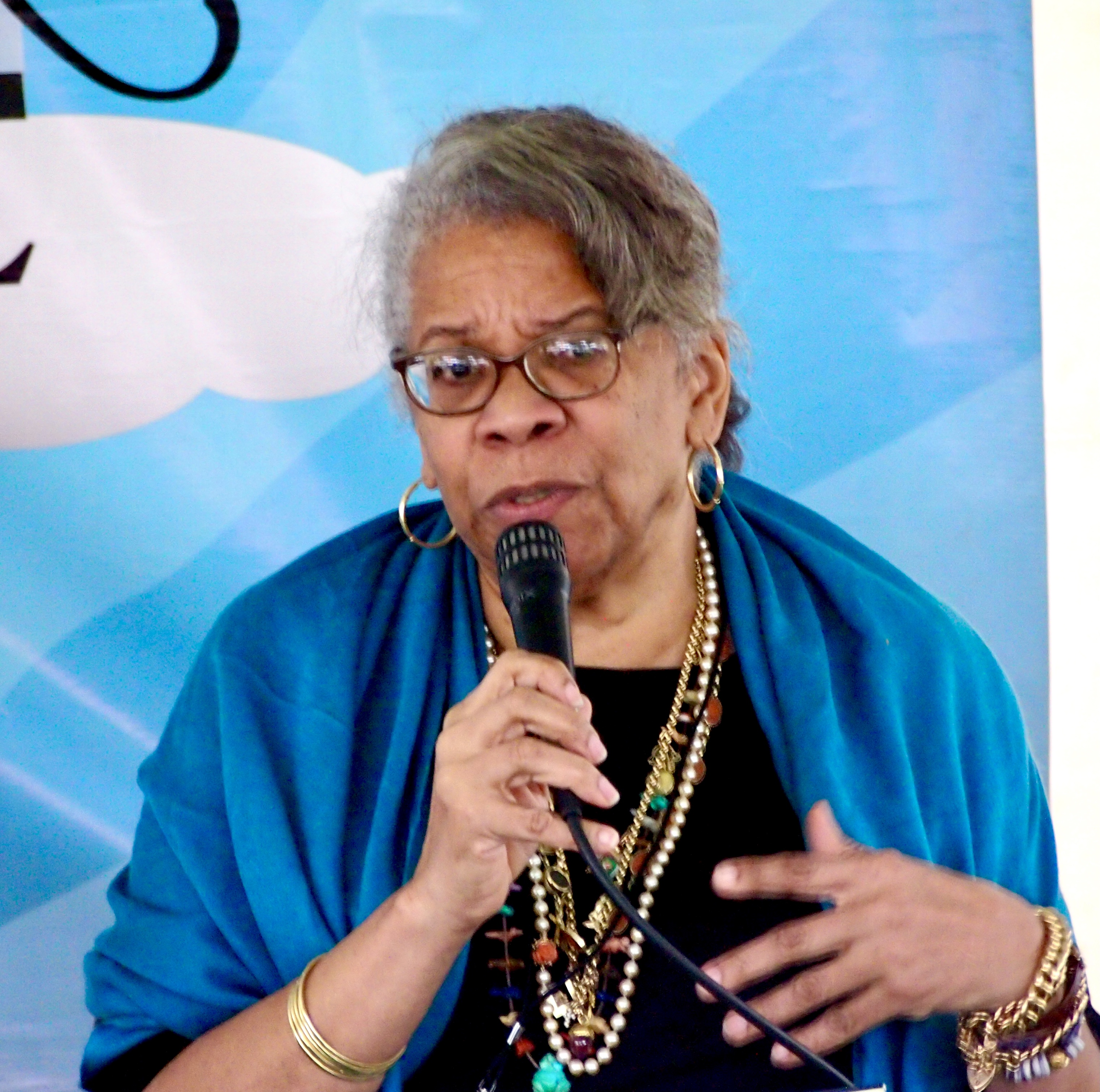
Jessica B. Harris

- Lifetime Achievement Award: Jessica B. Harris
- Humanitarian of the Year: Zero Foodprint

=== Restaurant Design Awards ===
- 75 Seats and Under: Heliotrope Architects, Rupee Bar, Seattle, Washington
- 76 Seats and Over: ORA and Klein Agency, Auburn, Los Angeles, California
- Design Icon: Chez Panisse, Berkeley, California

=== Book Awards ===
The 2020 James Beard Foundation Book Awards were as follows:

- American Cooking: Jubilee: Recipes from Two Centuries of African American Cooking by Toni Tipton-Martin (Clarkson Potter)
- Baking and Dessert: Living Bread: Tradition and Innovation in Artisan Bread Making by Daniel Leader and Lauren Chattman (Avery)
- Beverage with Recipes: The NoMad Cocktail Book by Leo Robitschek (Ten Speed Press)
- Beverage without Recipes: World Atlas of Wine 8th Edition by Hugh Johnson and Jancis Robinson (Mitchell Beazley)
- General Cooking: Where Cooking Begins: Uncomplicated Recipes to Make You a Great Cook by Carla Lalli Music (Clarkson Potter)
- Health and Special Diets: Gluten-Free Baking at Home: 102 Foolproof Recipes for Delicious Breads, Cakes, Cookies, and More by Jeffrey Larsen (Ten Speed Press)
- International: Ethiopia: Recipes and Traditions from the Horn of Africa by Yohanis Gebreyesus with Jeff Koehler (Interlink Publishing)
- Photography: American Sfoglino: A Master Class in Handmade Pasta by Eric Wolfinger (Chronicle Books)
- Reference, History, and Scholarship: The Whole Okra: A Seed to Stem Celebration by Chris Smith (Chelsea Green Publishing)
- Restaurant and Professional: The Whole Fish Cookbook: New Ways to Cook, Eat and Think by Josh Niland (Hardie Grant Books)
- Single Subject: Pasta Grannies: The Official Cookbook: The Secrets of Italy's Best Home Cooks by Vicky Bennison (Hardie Grant Books)
- Vegetable-Focused Cooking: Whole Food Cooking Every Day: Transform the Way You Eat with 250 Vegetarian Recipes Free of Gluten, Dairy, and Refined Sugar by Amy Chaplin (Artisan Books)
- Writing: Eat Like a Fish: My Adventures as a Fisherman Turned Restorative Ocean Farmer by Bren Smith (Knopf)
- Book of the Year: The Whole Fish Cookbook: New Ways to Cook, Eat and Think by Josh Niland (Hardie Grant Books)
- Cookbook Hall of Fame: Jancis Robinson

=== Broadcast Media Awards ===
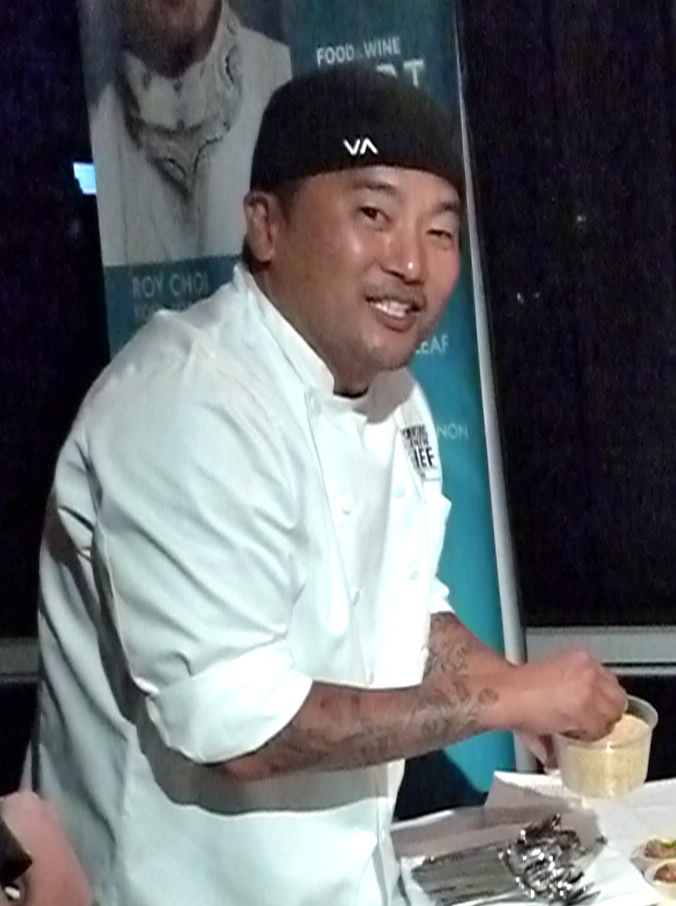
Roy Choi

The 2020 James Beard Foundation Broadcast Media Awards were as follows:

- Audio Program: It Burns: The Scandal-Plagued Race to Breed the World's Hottest Chili, Audible
- Audio Reporting: Gravy – Mahalia Jackson's Glori-Fried Chicken, Betsy Sheperd, southernfoodways.org
- Documentary: That's My Jazz, Vimeo
- Online Video, Fixed Location and/or Instructional: Grace Young – Wok Therapist, YouTube
- Online Video, on Location: Handmade – How Knives Are Made for New York's Best Restaurants; How a Ceramics Master Makes Plates for Michelin-Starred Restaurants, Eater
- Outstanding Personality: Roy Choi, Broken Bread with Roy Choi, KCET
- Television Program, in Studio or Fixed Location: Pati's Mexican Table – Tijuana: Stories from the Border, WETA
- Television Program, on Location: Las Crónicas del Taco (Taco Chronicles) – Canasta, Netflix
- Visual and Technical Excellence: Chef's Table, Netflix, Adam Bricker, Chloe Weaver, and Will Basanta
- Visual Reporting (on TV or Online): Rotten – The Avocado War, Netflix, Christine Haughney, Erin Cauchi, and Gretchen Goetz

=== Journalism Awards ===
The 2020 James Beard Foundation Journalism Awards were as follows:

- Columns: Power Rankings: "The Official Fast Food French Fry Power Rankings"; "The Official Spicy Snack Power Rankings"; "The Official Domestic Beer Power Rankings" by Lucas Kwan Peterson, Los Angeles Times
- Craig Claiborne Distinguished Restaurant Review Award: "Peter Luger Used to Sizzle. Now It Sputters."; "The 20 Most Delicious Things at Mercado Little Spain"; "Benno, Proudly Out of Step With the Age" by Pete Wells, The New York Times
- Dining and Travel: "In Pursuit of the Perfect Pizza" by Matt Goulding, Airbnb Magazine
- Feature Reporting: "Value Meal" by Tad Friend, The New Yorker
- Food Coverage in a General Interest Publication: The New Yorker
- Foodways: "A Real Hot Mess: How Grits Got Weaponized Against Cheating Men" by Cynthia R. Greenlee, MUNCHIES / Food by VICE
- Health and Wellness: "How Washington Keeps America Sick and Fat"; "Meet the Silicon Valley Investor Who Wants Washington to Figure Out What You Should Eat" by Catherine Boudreau and Helena Bottemiller Evich, Politico
- Home Cooking: "Fry Time" by Nancy Singleton Hachisu, Saveur
- Innovative Storytelling: "Food and Loathing on the Campaign Trail" by Gary He, Matt Buchanan, and Meghan McCarron, Eater
- Investigative Reporting: "The Man Who Attacked Me Works in Your Kitchen': Victim of Serial Groper Took Justice into Her Own Hands" by Amy Brittain and Maura Judkis, The Washington Post
- Jonathan Gold Local Voice Award: "In Search of Hot Beef"; "Chef Jack Riebel Is in the Fight of His Life"; "Harry Singh on the Perfect Roti, Trinidad, and Life in the Kitchen" by Dara Moskowitz Grumdahl, Mpls.St.Paul Magazine
- M.F.K. Fisher Distinguished Writing Award: "My Mother's Catfish Stew" by John T. Edge, Oxford American
- Personal Essay, Long Form: "The Dysfunction of Food" by Kim Foster
- Personal Essay, Short Form: "For 20 Years, happy hour has seen us through work — and life" by M. Carrie Allan, The Washington Post
- Profile: "The Provocations of Chef Tunde Wey" by Brett Martin, GQ Magazine
- Wine, Spirits, and Other Beverages: "Seltzer Is Over. Mineral Water Is Forever." by Jordan Michelman, PUNCH
- Emerging Voice Award: L.A. Taco

== 2021 awards ==
In August 2020, the James Beard Foundation announced that the 2020 awards presentation would be cancelled due to the COVID-19 pandemic. They will "forgo its traditional Awards presentation in 2021, including the Restaurant and Chef Awards, Media Awards, and Restaurant Design Awards. We will not be accepting recommendations or submissions. We will be working with the Awards Committee and Subcommittees to overhaul the policies and procedures for the Awards."

== 2022 awards ==
The 2022 James Beard Awards were presented on June 13, 2022, at The Lyric Opera of Chicago and hosted by Kwame Onwuachi. The media awards ceremony was on June 11, 2022, at Columbia College Chicago and was hosted by Lisa Ling, while the Leadership Awards ceremony was held on June 12, 2022, at The Dalcy in Chicago and hosted by Terry Bryant.

=== Lifetime Achievement and Humanitarian Award ===
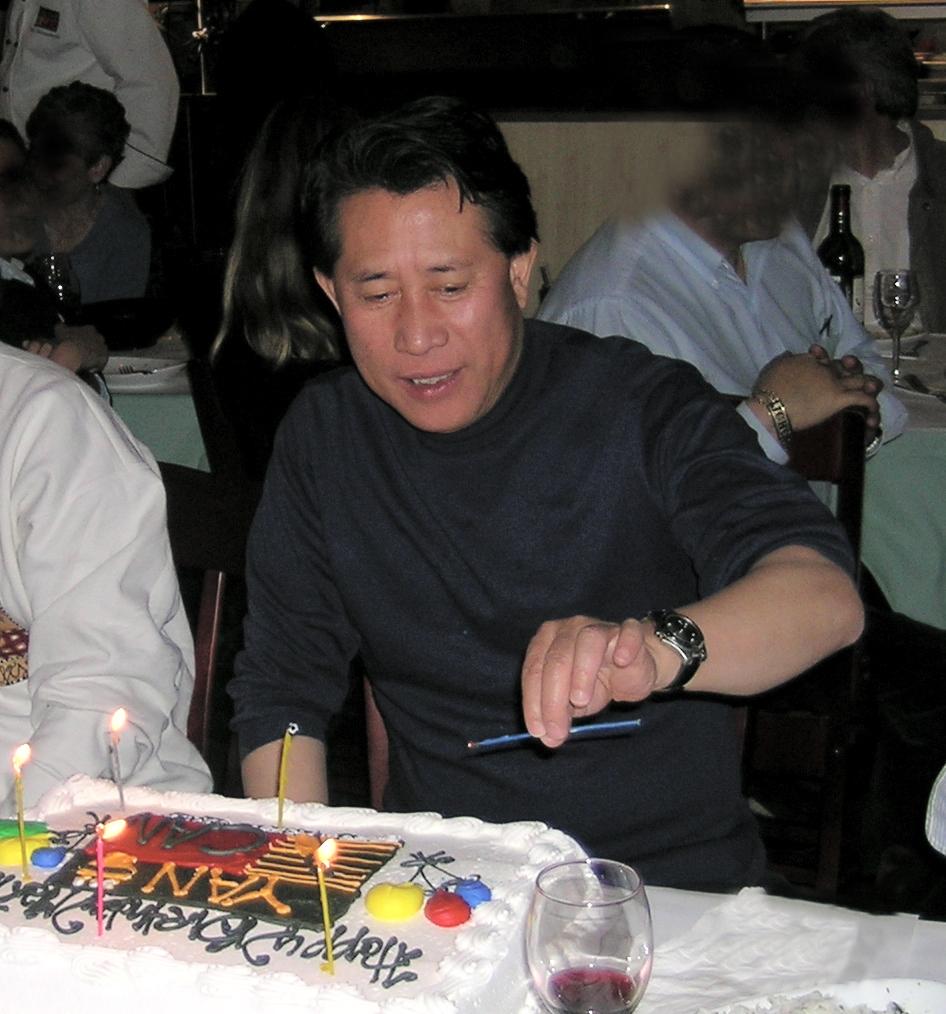
Martin Yan

- Lifetime Achievement Award: Martin Yan
- Humanitarian of the Year: Grace Young

=== Leadership Award ===
- Erika Allen
- Irene Li
- Mónica Ramírez
- Mavis-Jay Sanders
- Emerging Leadership: Understory, Oakland, CA

=== Restaurant and Chef Awards ===
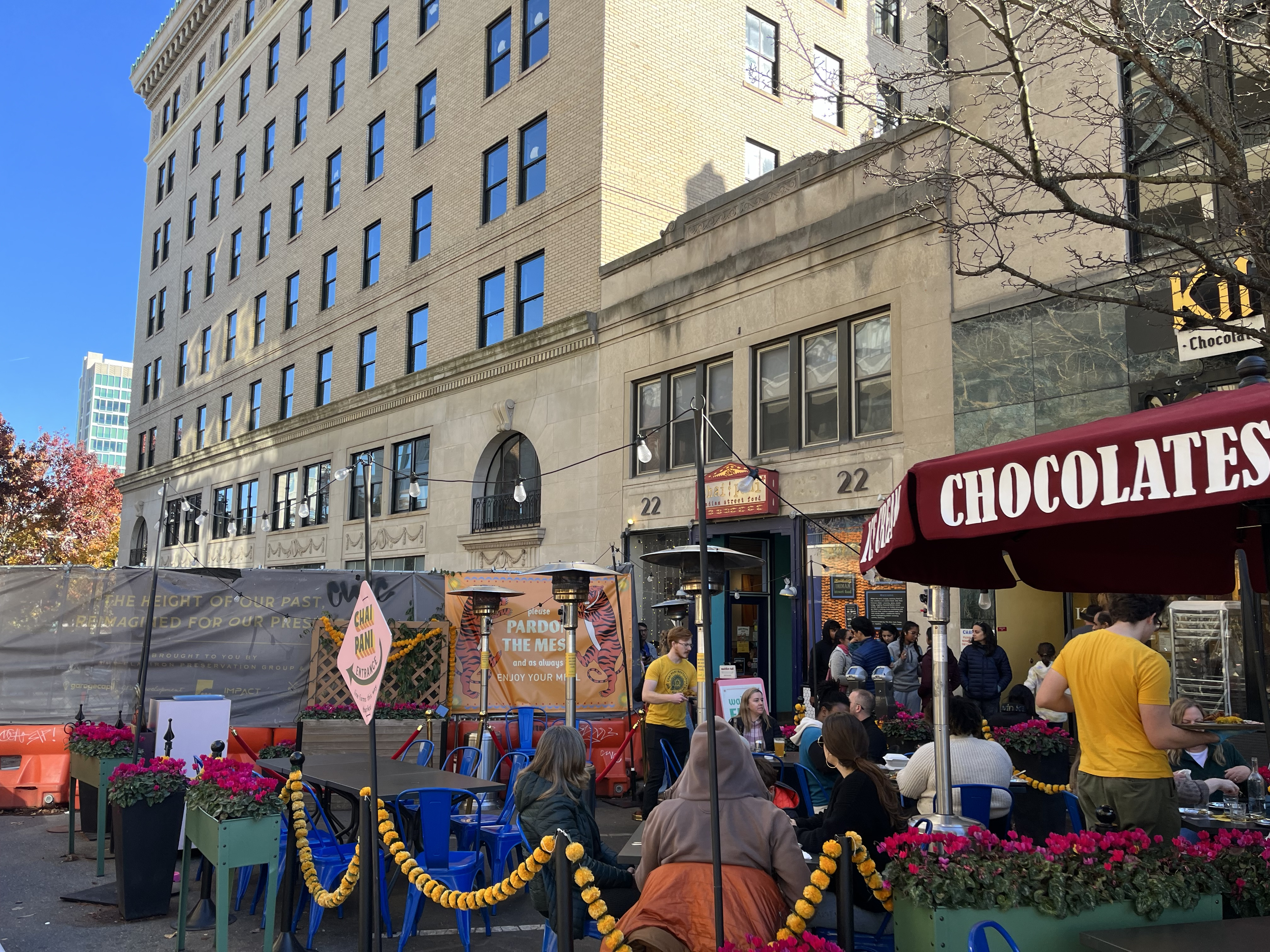
Chai Pani, Asheville, North Carolina

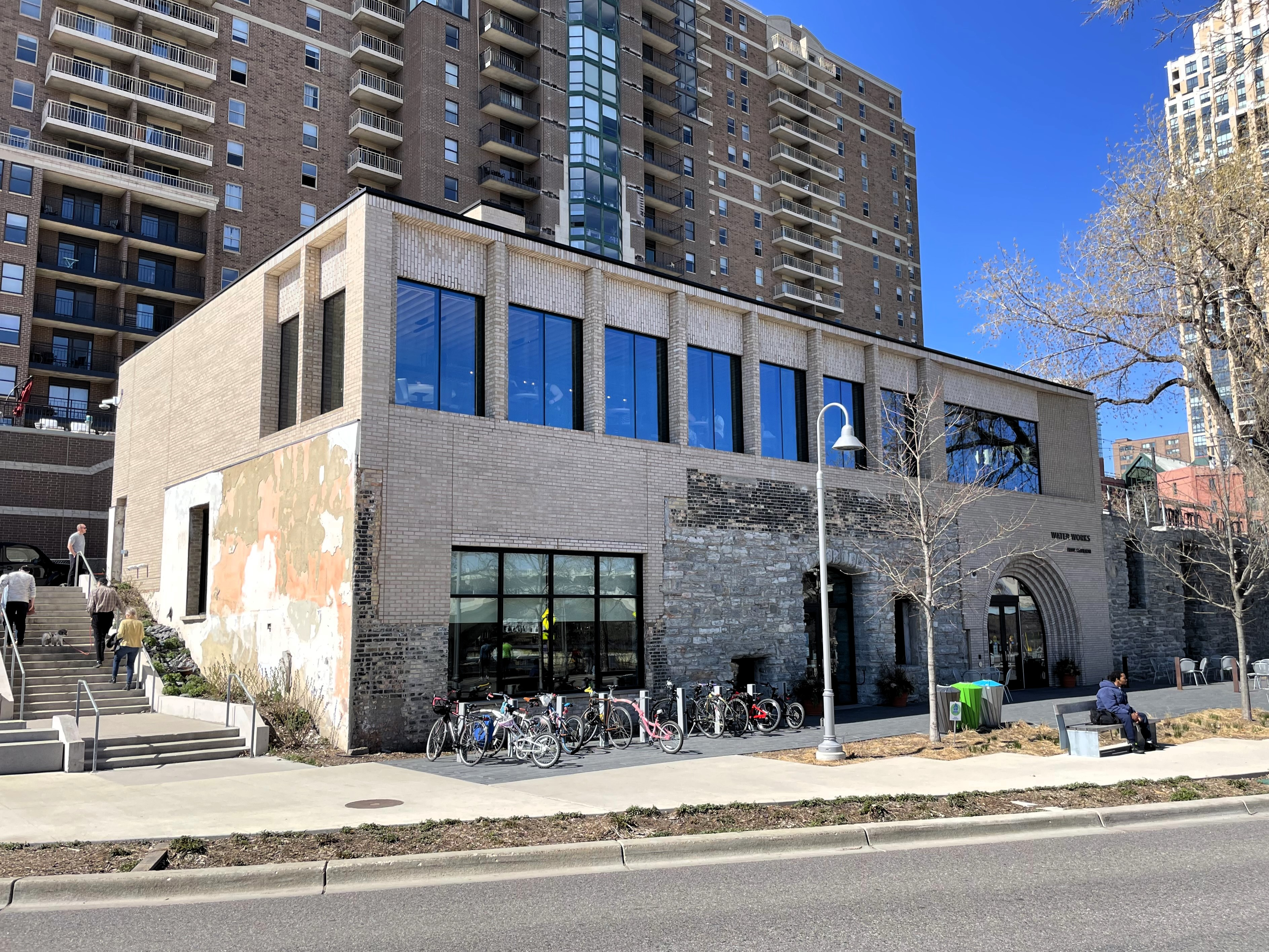
Owamni, Minneapolis, Minnesota

The James Beard Foundation Restaurant and Chef Awards in 2022 were as follows:

- Outstanding Restaurateur: Chris Bianco, Tratto, Pane Bianco, and Pizzeria Bianco, Phoenix, AZ
- Outstanding Chef: Mashama Bailey, The Grey, Savannah, GA
- Outstanding Restaurant : Chai Pani, Asheville, NC
- Emerging Chef: Edgar Rico, Nixta Taqueria, Austin, TX
- Best New Restaurant: Owamni, Minneapolis, MN
- Outstanding Pastry Chef: Warda Bouguettaya, Warda Pâtisserie, Detroit, MI
- Outstanding Baker: Don Guerra, Barrio Bread, Tucson, AZ
- Outstanding Hospitality: Cúrate, Asheville, NC
- Outstanding Wine Program: The Four Horsemen, New York, NY
- Outstanding Bar Program: Julep, Houston, TX
- Best Chef: California - Brandon Jew, Mister Jiu's, San Francisco, CA
- Best Chef: Great Lakes (IL, IN, MI, OH) - Erick Williams, Virtue Restaurant & Bar, Chicago, IL
- Best Chef: Mid-Atlantic (DC, DE, MD, NJ, PA, VA) - Cristina Martinez, South Philly Barbacoa, Philadelphia, PA
- Best Chef: Midwest (IA, KS, MN, MO, NE, ND, SD, WI) - Dane Baldwin, The Diplomat, Milwaukee, WI
- Best Chef: Mountain (CO, ID, MT, UT, WY) - Caroline Glover, Annette, Aurora, CO
- Best Chef: New York State - Chintan Pandya, Dhamaka, New York, NY
- Best Chef: Northeast (CT, MA, ME, NH, RI, VT) - Nisachon Morgan, Saap, Randolph, VT
- Best Chef: Northwest and Pacific (AK, HI, OR, WA) - Robynne Maii, Fête, Honolulu, HI
- Best Chef: Southeast (GA, KY, NC, SC, TN, WV) - Ricky Moore, Saltbox Seafood Joint, Durham, NC
- Best Chef: South (AL, AR, FL, LA, MS, PR) - Adam Evans, Automatic Seafood and Oysters, Birmingham, AL
- Best Chef: Southwest (AZ, NM, NV, OK) - Fernando Olea, Sazón, Santa Fe, NM
- Best Chef: Texas - Iliana de la Vega, El Naranjo, Austin, TX

=== Book Awards ===
The 2022 James Beard Foundation Book Awards were as follows:

- Baking and Desserts: Mooncakes and Milk Bread: Sweet and Savory Recipes Inspired by Chinese Bakeries, by Kristina Cho (Harper Horizon)
- Beverage with Recipes: The Way of the Cocktail: Japanese Traditions, Techniques, and Recipes by Julia Momose with Emma Janzen (Penguin Random House)
- Beverage without Recipes: Girly Drinks: A World History of Women and Alcohol, by Mallory O'Meara (Hanover Square Press)
- General: Everyone's Table: Global Recipes for Modern Health, by Gregory Gourdet and JJ Goode (Harper Wave)
- International: In Bibi's Kitchen: The Recipes and Stories of Grandmothers from the Eight African Countries That Touch the Indian Ocean, by Hawa Hassan and Julia Turshen
- Reference, History, and Scholarship: Black Smoke: African Americans and the United States of Barbecue, by Adrian Miller (University of North Carolina Press)
- Restaurant and Professional: Mr Jiu's in Chinatown: Recipes and Stories from the Birthplace of Chinese American Food, by Brandon Jew and Tienlon Ho (Ten Speed Press)
- Single Subject: The Hog Book: A Chef's Guide to Hunting, Butchering and Cooking Wild Pigs, by Jesse Griffiths (Wild Hog Project)
- US Foodways: Mosquito Supper Club: Cajun Recipes from a Disappearing Bayou, by Melissa M Martin (Artisan Books)
- Vegetable-Focused Cooking: The Korean Vegan Cookbook: Reflections and Recipes from Omma's Kitchen by Joanne Lee Molinaro (Clarkson Potter)
- Visuals: Take One Fish:The New School of Scale-to-Tail Cooking and Eating, Rob Palmer and Daniel New (Harbie Grant)
- Writing: Franchise: The Golden Arches in Black America, by Marcia Chateline (Liveright)

=== Broadcast Media Awards ===
The 2022 James Beard Foundation Broadcast Media Awards were as follows:

- Documentary/Docuseries: Gathers, Netflix
- Instructional Visual Media: The Wild Harvest with Alan Bargo, Vimeo
- Reality or Competition Visual Media: Top Chef: Family Style - Truffles, Caviar & Prawns -- Oh My!, Peacock
- Commercial/Sponsored Visual Media: Justin V. Barocas: Uber Eats Presents: On the Rise with Marcus Samuelsson, Eater, YouTube, Instagram
- Visual Media - Short Form: Eat This: What Everyone Gets Wrong About Farm Work, AJ+
- Visual Media - Long Form: Taste the Nation: Holiday Edition, Hulu
- Social Media Account: Alexis Nikole Nelson, @blackforager, TikTok and Instagram
- Audio Programming: Dish City - How American Chinese Food Became Delivery Food, WAMU
- Audio Reporting: Dan Pashman, Emma Morgenstern, Andres O'Hara, The Sporkful - A Reckoning At Bon Appétit, Update: Inside the Turmoil at Bon Appétit, various podcasts platforms

=== Journalism Awards ===
- Columns and Newsletters: Tex-Mexplainer: "Nixtamalization Is the 3,500-Year-Old Secret to Great Tortillas"; "Live a Little and Try Crunching on Chapulines, or Roasted Grasshoppers"; "Forget Everything You Think You Know About Mole" by Jose Ralat, Texas Monthly
- Dining and Travel: Francis Lam, Condé Nast Traveler
- Feature Reporting: "Inside the Secretive, Semi-Illict, High Stakes World of WhatsApp Mango Importing" by Ahmed Ali Akbar, Eater
- Food Coverage in a General Publication: The Bitter Southerner
- Foodways: "Eating in Xi'an, Where Wheat and Lamb Speak to China's Varied Palate" by Ligaya Mishan, T Magazine
- Health and Wellness: "Cultivating Better Health" by Michael Behar, Eating Well
- Home Cooking: "The Way of Clay" by Mary Frances Heck
- Innovative Storytelling: "A Feast for Lost Souls" by Annelise Jolley and Zahara Gómez Lucini, Atavist Magazine
- Investigative Reporting: "NYC Food Delivery Workers Band to Demand Better Treatment. Will New York Listen to Los Deliveristas Unidos?"; " Food Delivery Workers Toiling Through Historic Flooding Call Skimpy Wages and Tips 'A Cruel Joke"; "New York City Passes Landmark New Protections for Food Delivery Workers" by Claudia Irizarry Aponte and Josefa Velasquez, The City NYC
- Personal Essay - Long Form: "It's Time to Decolonize Wine" by Miguel de Leon, Punch
- Personal Essay - Short Form: "The Dangers of Bartending While Asian" by Kaylee Hammonds, Food and Wine
- Profile: "Patsy Young - American Brewer, Fugutive From Slavery" by Theresa McCulla, Good Beer Hunting
- Jonathan Gold Local Voice Award: "'Too Much to Lose.' Why a Miami Man Moved into a Backyard Tent During Coronavirus Crisis"; "Salt Bae's Restaurant Called Cops on Customer who Wouldn't Pay for Gold Wrapped Steaks"; "How to Eat Like a Local in Miami: A Local's Guide to Dining in the 305" by Carlos Frias, Miami Herald
- Craig Claiborne Distinguished Restaurant RevIew Award: "The Bay Area is Having a Love Affair with Smashburgers. This is the One You'll Want to Eat Again and Again"; "Impossible's New Vegan Nuggets Taste Better than McNugget's. Sadly, that's not Saying Much"; "S.F. Restaurant's $72 Fried Rice Was a Runaway Hit. It was Also the Chef's Nightmare" by Soleil Ho, San Francisco Chronicle
- MFK Fisher Distinguished Writing Award: "Right Around the Corner" by Frances Lam, Condé Nast Traveler

== 2023 awards ==
The 2023 James Beard Awards were presented on June 5, 2023, at The Lyric Opera of Chicago and hosted by Eric Adjepong, Esther Choi, Gail Simmons and Andrew Zimmern. The media awards ceremony was on June 3, 2024, at Columbia College Chicago and was hosted by Pati Jinich, while the Leadership Awards ceremony was held on June 4, 2023, at The Dalcy in Chicago and hosted by Dr. Jessica B. Harris.

=== Lifetime Achievement and Humanitarian of the Year Awards ===
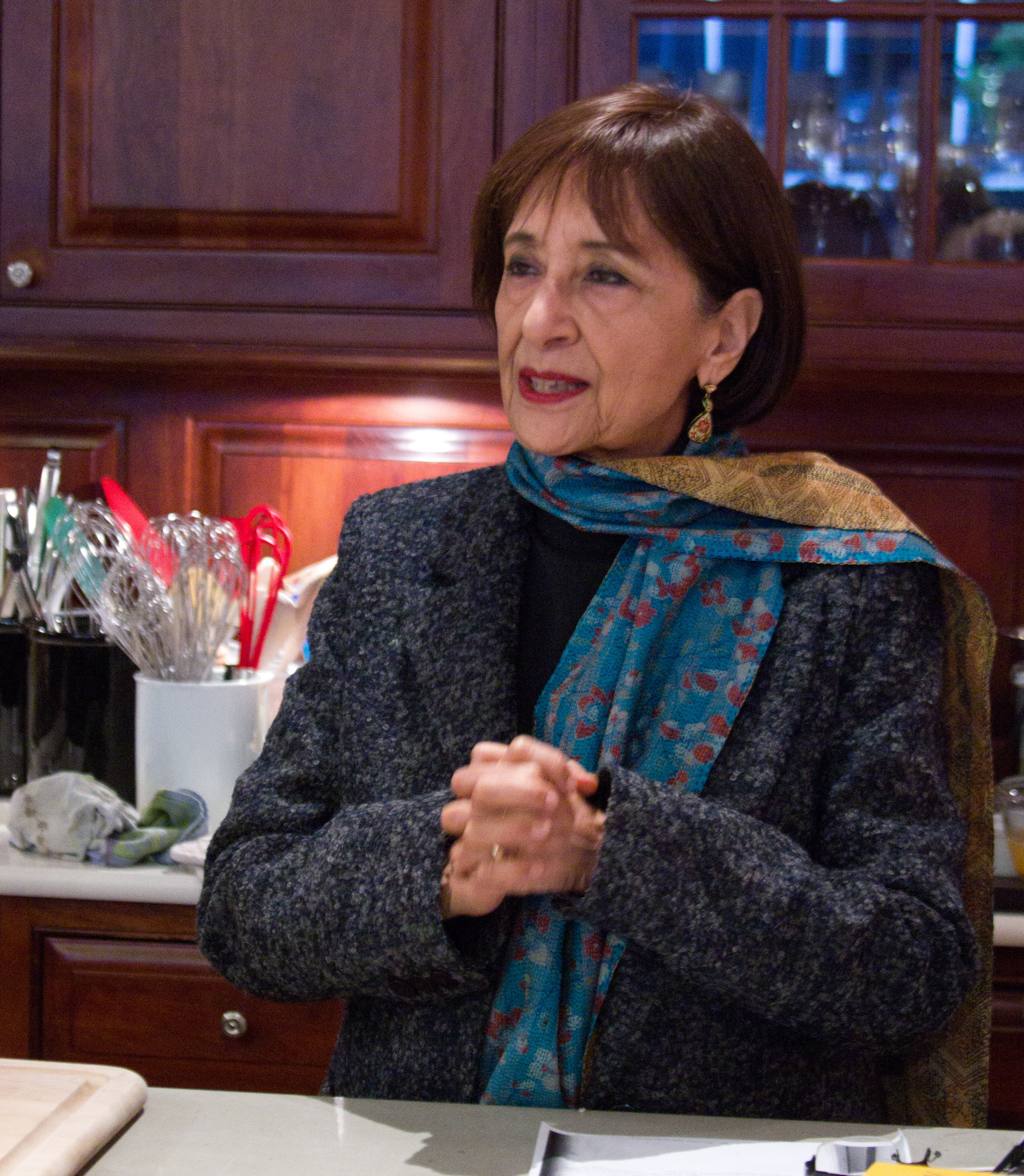
Madhur Jaffrey

- Lifetime Achievement Award: Madhur Jaffrey, cookbook author, writer, teacher, and actress.
- Humanitarian of the Year Award: Olivia Watkins and Karen Washington, co-founders of the Black Farmer Fund.

=== Leadership Award ===
- Jim Embry, Founder of Sustainable Communities Network, Slow Food USA, and Ujamaa Cooperative Farming Alliance
- Valerie Horn, Board Chair for Community Agricultural Nutritional Enterprises (CANE Kitchen), Cowan Community Center, and City of Whitesburg Farmers Market
- Savonala "Savi" Horne, Executive Director of the North Carolina Association of Black Lawyers, Land Loss Prevention Project
- Ira Wallace, Owner of Southern Exposure Seed Exchange
- Rowen White, Founder and Creative Director of Sierra Seeds
- Emerging Leadership: The Burgerville Workers Union

=== Restaurant and Chef Awards ===
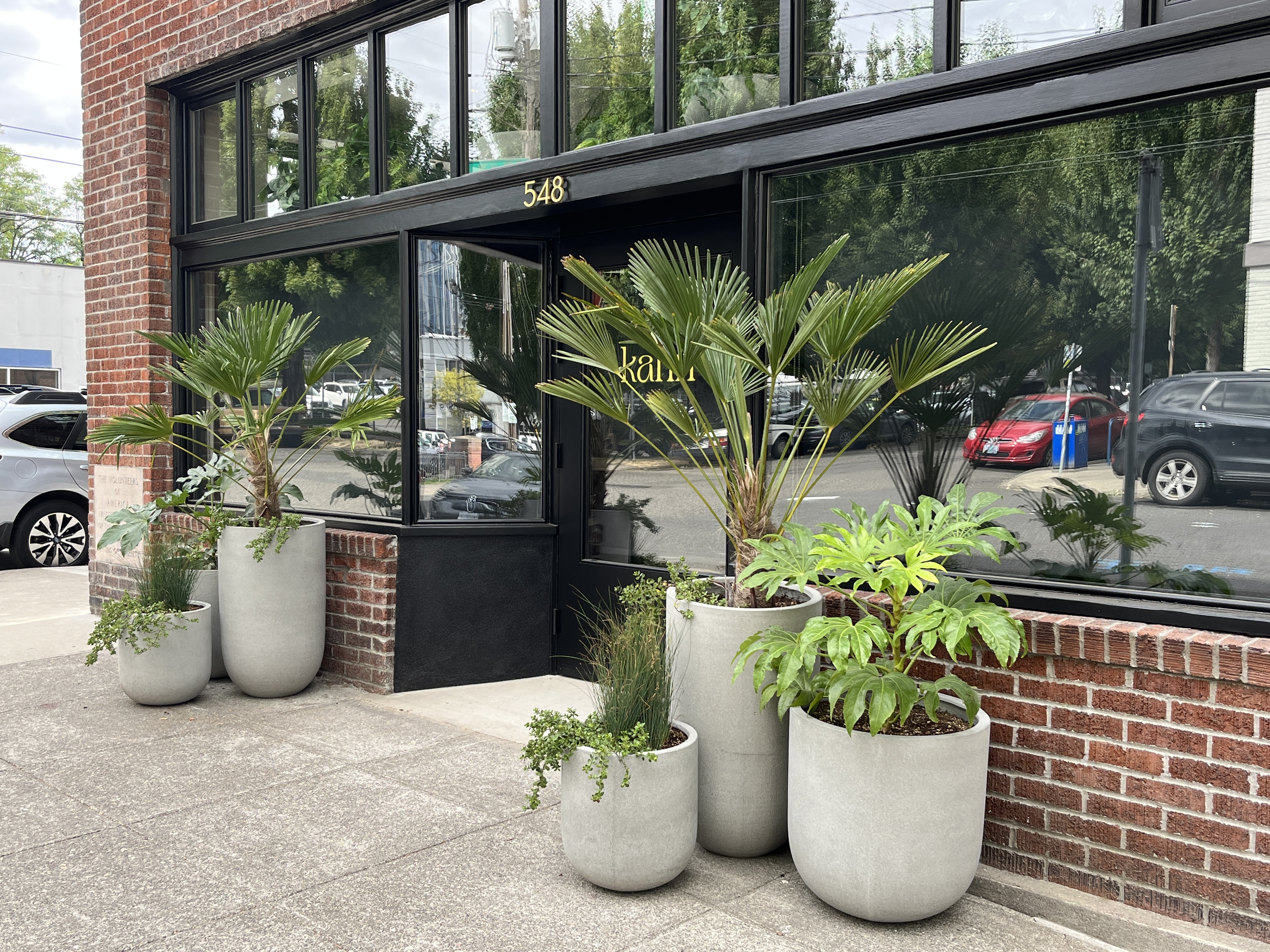
Kann, Portland, Oregon

The James Beard Foundation Restaurant and Chef Awards in 2023 were as follows:

- Outstanding Restaurateur: Ellen Yin, High Street Hospitality Group (Fork, a.kitchen + bar, High Street, etc.), Philadelphia, PA
- Outstanding Chef: Rob Rubba, Oyster Oyster, Washington, D.C.
- Outstanding Restaurant: Friday, Saturday, Sunday, Philadelphia, PA
- Emerging Chef: Damarr Brown, Virtue, Chicago, IL
- Best New Restaurant: Kann, Portland, OR
- Outstanding Bakery: Yoli Tortilleria, Kansas City, MO
- Outstanding Pastry Chef or Baker: Margarita Manzke, République, Los Angeles, CA
- Outstanding Hospitality: The Quarry, Monson ME
- Outstanding Wine and Other Beverages Program: OTOTO, Los Angeles, CA
- Outstanding Bar Program: Bar Leather Apron, Honolulu, HI
- Best Chef: California - Justin Pichetrungsi, Anajak Thai, Sherman Oaks, CA
- Best Chef: Great Lakes (IL, IN, MI, OH) - Tim Flores and Genie Kwon, Kasama, Chicago, IL
- Best Chef: Mid-Atlantic (DC, DE, MD, NJ, PA, VA) - Chutatip "Nok" Suntaranon, Kalaya, Philadelphia, PA
- Best Chef: Midwest (IA, KS, MN, MO, NE, ND, SD, WI) - Itaru Nagano and Andrew Kroeger, Fairchild, Madison, WI
- Best Chef: Mountain (CO, ID, MT, UT, WY) - Kris Komori, KIN, Boise, ID
- Best Chef: New York State - Junghyun Park, ATOMIX, New York, NY
- Best Chef: Northeast (CT, MA, ME, NH, RI, VT) - Sherry Pocknett, Sly Fox Den Too, Charlestown, RI
- Best Chef: Northwest and Pacific (AK, HI, OR, WA) - Vince Nguyen, Berlu, Portland, OR
- Best Chef: South (AL, AR, FL, LA, MS, PR) - Natalia Vallejo, Cocina al Fondo, San Juan, PR
- Best Chef: Southeast (GA, KY, NC, SC, TN, WV) - Terry Koval, The Deer and the Dove, Decatur, GA
- Best Chef: Southwest (AZ, NM, NV, OK) - Andrew Black, Grey Sweater, Oklahoma City, OK
- Best Chef: Texas - Benchawan Jabthong Painter, Street to Kitchen, Houston, TX

=== Book Awards ===
- Baking and Dessert: Tava: Eastern European Baking and Desserts from Romania & Beyond by Irina Georgescu (Hardie Grant Books)
- Beverage with Recipes: The Bartender's Manifesto: How to Think, Drink, and Create Cocktails Like a Pro by Toby Maloney and Emma Janzen (Clarkson Potter)
- Beverage without Recipes: Exploring the World of Japanese Craft Sake: Rice, Water, Earth by Nancy Matsumoto and Michael Tremblay (Tuttle Publishing)
- Bread: The Perfect Loaf: The Craft and Science of Sourdough Breads, Sweets, and More: A Baking Book by Maurizio Leo (Clarkson Potter)
- Food Issues and Advocacy: Eating While Black: Food Shaming and Race in America by Psyche A. Williams-Forson (University of North Carolina Press)
- General: The Cook You Want to be: Everyday Recipes to Impress by Andy Baraghani (Lorena Jones Books)
- International: Mi Cocina: Recipes and Rapture from My Kitchen in Mexico: A Cookbook by Rick Martinez (Clarkson Potter)
- Literacy Writing: Savor: A Chef's Hunger for More b y Fatima Ali and Tarajia Morrell (Ballantine Books)
- Reference, History, and Scholarship: Slaves for Peanuts: A Story of Conquest, Liberation, and a Crop That Changed History by Jori Lewis (The New Press)
- Restaurant and Professional: Bludso's BBQ Cookbook: A Family Affair in Smoke and Soul by Kevin Bludso and Noah Galuten (Ten Speed Press)
- Single Subject: The Wok: Recipes and Techniques by J. Kenji López-Alt (W.W. Norton & Company)
- US Foodways: I Am From Here: Stories and Recipes from a Southern Chef by Vishwesh Bhatt (W W Norton and Company)
- Vegetable-Focused Cooking: The Vegan Chinese Kitchen: Recipes and Modern Stories from a Thousand-Year-Old Tradition: A Cookbook by Hannah Che (Clarkson Potter)
- Visuals: Chinese-ish: Home Cooking Not Quite Authentic, 100% Delicious by Joanna Hu and Armelle Habib (Interlink Books)
- Cookbook Hall of Fame: Joe Randall
- Emerging Voice: Diasporican: A Puerto Rican Cookbook by Illyanna Maisonet (Ten Speed Press)

=== Broadcast Media Awards ===
- Audio Programming: Copper & Heat "Abalone: The Cost of Consumption", various podcast platforms
- Audio Reporting: Jane Black and Elizabeth Dunn, Pressure Cooker "The Twisted History of School Lunch in America", various podcast platforms
- Commercial Media: Hallie Davison, Jorge Gaviria, and Daniel Klein, Masiends Lresents, YouTube
- Documentary/Docuseries Visual Media: Coldwater Kitchen, various film festivals
- Instructional Visual Media: Big Sky Kitchen With Eduardo Garcia, Magnolia Network and Discovery +
- Reality or Competition Visual Media: Restaurant Takeoverv ft. Matta, YouTube
- Visual Media - Short Form: CBS Sunday Mirning "Black, White, and The Grey"; "How Erin French found herself at The Lost Kitchen", CBS
- Visual Media - Long Form: The Whole Animal, SOMM TV
- Social Media Account: Erwan Heussaff, Erwan, Instagram
- Emerging Voice: Abena Anim-Somuah, Host, The Future of Food is You, Cherry Bombe

=== Journalism Awards ===
- Beverage: "Lost in Translation - How Flavor Wheels and Tasting Tools Can Evolve to Speak with Global Beer Drinkers", by Mark Dredge, Good Beer Hunting
- Columns and Newsletters: "Tetelas Are the Tasty Triangles You Need to Try Right Now"; "Birria Is the Greatest Threat to Taco Culture - and It's Savior"; "Trompo Tacos Are So Much More Than Tacos al Pastor", by José R. Ralat, Texas Monthly
- Dining and Travel: "The I-95 exit-by-exit eating guide"; "Don't leave home without your I-95 eating guide", by Honna Raskin, The Food Section
- Feature Reporting: "Blood, Sweat, and Tears", by Shane Mitchell, The Bitter Southerner
- Food Coverage in a General Interest Publication: The Bitter Southerner
- Foodways: "Come Hell or High Water - Oysters, Brewing, and How the Come Yahs & Bin Yahs Could End Sea Level Rise in Charleston", by Jamal Lemon, Good Beer Hunting
- Health and Wellness: "How the Supreme Court Decision Exacerbated the Dire State of Bar Industry", by Betsy Andrews, SevenFifty Daily
- Home Cooking: "Sour Power", by Lara Lee, Food & Wine
- Innovative Storytelling: "Night Market", by Thrillist Staff, Thrillist
- Investigative Reporting: "Animal Agriculture Is Dangerous Work. The People Who Do It Have Few Protections."; "I Was Coughing So Hard I Would Throw Up"; "Tyson Says It's Nurses Help Workers. Critics Charge They Stymie OSHA.", by Christina Cooke, Alice Driver, and Gosia Wozniacka, Civil Eats
- Personal Essays with Recipes: "Dog S#!t Dacquoise", Diep Tran, Food & Wine
- Personal Essays without Recipes: "On Baba", by Kyla Wazana Tompkins, The LARB Quarterly of the Los Angeles Review of Books
- Profile: "The Sweetest Harvest", by Kayla Stewart and Clay Williams, Food & Wine
- Emerging Voice: Lyndsay C. Green, Restaurant and Dining Critic, Detroit Free Press
- Jonathan Gould Loval Voice Award: "When I Feel Unmoored by Life, I Always Find My Way Back to Either/Or"; "At Mira's East African Cuisine, One Family's Iftar Traditions Take the Forefront"; "Why Isn't There an Overdode Kit Stocked Behind Every Bar in Portland?", by Brooke Jackson-Glidden, Eater
- Craig Claiborne Distinguished Restaurant Review Award: "Poncho's T layudas, a window to Oaxaca, serve one of L.A.'s defining dishes"; "At Chinatown's Pearl River Deli, the menu is always changing - and worth chasing"; "Anajak Thai is our 2022 Restaurant of the Year", by Bill Addison, Los Angeles Times
- MFK Fisher Distinguished Writing Award: "Blood, Sweat, and Tears", by Shane Mitchell, The Bitter Southerner

== 2024 awards ==
The 2024 James Beard Awards were presented on June 10, 2024, at The Lyric Opera of Chicago and hosted by Nyesha Arrington, Richard Blais, Amanda Freitag and Marcus Samuelsson. The media awards ceremony was held on June 8, 2024 at Columbia College Chicago, hosted by Michelle Miller, while the Leadership Awards ceremony was held on June 9, 2024 at The Dalcy in Chicago and hosted by Karen Washington.

=== Lifetime Achievement and Humanitarian of the Year Awards ===
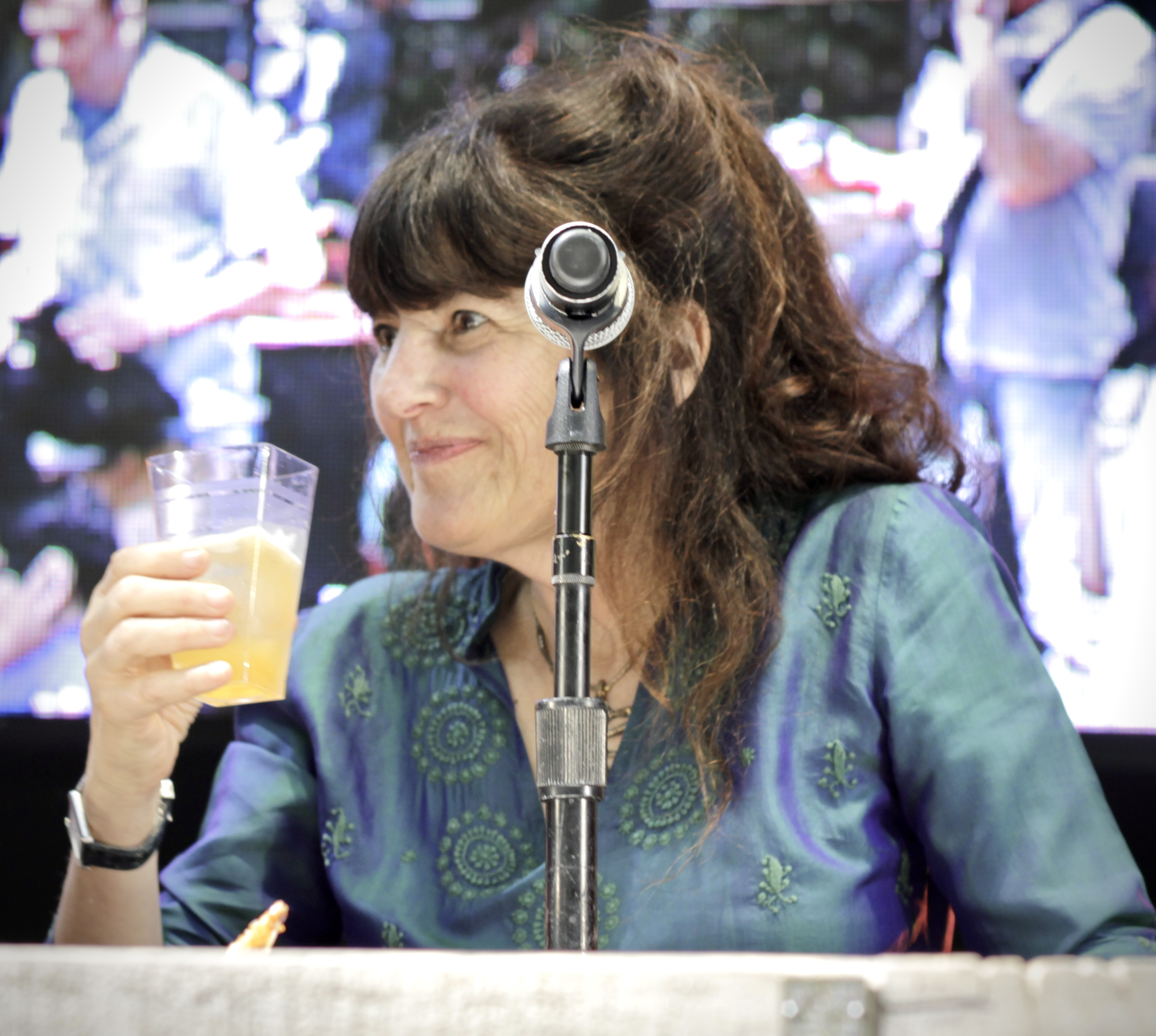
Ruth Reichl

- Lifetime Achievement Award: Ruth Reichl
- Humanitarian of the Year Award: Lee Initiative

=== Leadership Award ===
- Muhammad Abdul-Hadi
- Niaz Dorry
- Helga Garza
- Mai Nguyen
- Emerging Leadership: Christa Barfield

=== Restaurant and Chef Awards ===
- Outstanding Chef of the Year: Michael Rafidi, Albi, Washington, D.C.
- Outstanding Restaurant: Langbaan, Portland, OR
- Best New Restaurant: Dakar NOLA, New Orleans, LA
- Outstanding Restauranter: Erika Whitaker and Kelly Whitaker, ID EST (The Wolf's Tailor, BRUTØ, Basta and others), Boulder, CO
- Emerging Chef: Masako Morishita, Perry's, Washington, D.C.
- Outstanding Bakery: ZU Bakery, Portland, ME
- Outstanding Hospitality, Lula Cafe, Chicago, IL
- Outstanding Wine Program, Lula Drake Wine Parlour, Columbia, SC
- Outstanding Bar: Jewel of the South, New Orleans, LA
- Best Chef: California - Lord Maynard Llera, Kuya Lord, Los Angeles, CA
- Best Chef: Great Lakes (IL, IN, MI, OH) - Hajime Sato, Sozai, Clawson, MI
- Best Chef: Mid-Atlantic (DC, DE, MD, NJ, PA, VA) - Harley Peet, Bas Rouge, Easton, MD
- Best Chef: Midwest (IA, KS, MN, MO, NE, ND, SD, WI) - Christina Nguyen, Hai Hai and Hola Arepa, Minneapolis, MN
- Best Chef: Mountain (CO, ID, MT, UT, WY) - Matt Vawter, Rootstalk, Breckenridge, CO
- Best Chef: New York State - Charlie Mitchell, Clover Hill, Brooklyn, NY
- Best Chef: Northeast (CT, MA, ME, NH, RI, VT) - David Standridge, The Shipwright's Daughter, Mystic, CT
- Best Chef: Northwest and Pacific (AK, HI, OR, WA) - Gregory Gourdet, kann, Portland, OR
- Best Chef: South (AL, AR, FL, LA, MS, PR) - Valerie Chang, Maty's, Miami, FL
- Best Chef: Southeast (GA, KY, NC, SC, TN, WV) - Paul Smith, 1010 Bridge, Charleston, WV
- Best Chef: Southwest (AZ, NM, NV, OK) - Rene Andrade, Bacanora, Phoenix, AZ
- Best Chef: Texas - Ana Liz Pulido, Ana Liz Taqueria, Mission, TX

=== Book Awards ===
- Baking and Desserts: Dark Rye and Honey Cake: Festival Baking from Belgium, the Heart of the Low Countries, by Regula Ysewijn (Weldon Owen)
- Beverage with Recipes: Slow Drinks: A Field Guide to Foraging and Fermenting Seasonal Sodas, Botanical Cocktails, Homemade Wines, and More, by Danny Childs (Hardie Grant North America)
- Beverages without Recipes: Agave Spirits: The Past, Present, and Future of Mezcals, by Gary Paul Nabhan and David Syep Piñera (W.W. Norton & Company)
- Food Issues and Advocacy: Resilient Kitchens: American Immigrant Cooking in a Time of Crisis: Essays and Recipes, by Phillip Gleissner and Harry Eli Kashdan (Rutgers University Press)
- General: Start Here: Instructions for Becoming a Better Cook, by Sohla El-Waylly (Alfred A. Knopf)
- International: The World Central Kitchen Cookbook, by José Andrés and World Central Kitchen with Sam Chapple-Sokol (Clarkson Potter)
- Literacy Writing: The Migrant Chef: The Life and Times of Lola García, by Laura Tillman (W.W. Norton & Company)
- Reference, History, and Scholarship: White Burgers, Black Cash: Fast Food from Black Exclusion to Exploitation, by Naa Oyo A. Kwate (University of Minnesota Press)
- Single Subject: Pasta Every Day: Make It, Shape It, Sauce It, Eat It, by Meryl Feinstein (Hachette Book Group)
- US Foodways: Love Japan: Recipes from Our Japanese American Kitchen, by Aaron Israel and Sawako Okochi with Gabriel Gershenson (Ten Speed Press)
- Vegetable-Focused Cooking: Tenderheart: A Cookbook About Vegetables and Unbreakable Family Bonds by Hetty Lui McKinnon
- Visuals: The Book of Sichuan Chili Crisp, by Yudi Echevarria (Ten Speed Press)
- Cookbook Hall of Fame: Pierre Thiam
- Emerging Voices: Maymu: Filipino American Desserts Remixed, by Abi Balingit (HarperCollins)

=== Broadcast Media Awards ===
- Audio Programming: Fed with Chris van Tulleken "Series 1: Planet Chicken", BBC Sounds and BBC Radio 4
- Audio Reporting: Samia Basille, Emma Morgenstern, and Dan Pashman The Sporkful "What 'Couscousgate' Tells Ua About French Food", various podcast platforms
- Commercial Media: The Mayda Creative Co. and Weiden+Kennedy New York The Black Kitchen Series: Innovators, Season 2, various podcast platforms
- Documentary Visual Media: The Michoacán File, various film festivals
- Docuseries Visual Nedua: La Frontera with Pati Jinich, Season 2, PBS and Amazon Prime
- Instructional Visual Media: Made with Lau, YouTube
- Social Media Account: KJ Kearney, Black Food Fridays, Instagram
- Unscripted Visual Media: Street Eats, Bon Appétit, Bon Appétit website and YouTube
- Visual Media Short Form: Great Wall, Undercurrent channel on Vimeo
- Visual Media Long Form: SOMM: Cup of Salvation, SOMM TV
- Emerging Voice: Randy Lau, Made with Lau, YouTube, Instagram, and TikTok

=== Journalism Awards ===
- Beverage: "Navigating the new sober boom, where a person's sobriety is as unique as their fingerprint", by D. Watkins, Salon
- Columns and Newsletters: "A meal of many seasons"; "Good ice"; "Subsistence abundance", by Laureli Ivanoff, High Country News
- Dining and Travel: "An Inspiring Journey Home"; 21 Things Craig LaBan Ate in Mexico"; Mexican Spirits, Philly Energy", by Jessica Griffin and Craig LaBan, The Philadelphia Inquirer
- Feature Reporting: "Saving the Hogs of Ossabow Island: An eccentric heiress, a daring mission, and the fight for North America's most unusual pig.", by Diana Hubell, Gastro Obscura
- Food Coverage in a General Interest Publication: Switchyard and FERN
- Foodways: "Billions of snow crabs are missing. A remote Alaskan village depends on the harvest to survive.", by Julia O'Malley, Grist and Fern
- Health and Wellness: "Melted, pounded, extruded: Why many ultra-processed foods are unhealthy", Anahad O'Conner and Aaron Steckelburg, The Washington Post
- Home Cooking: "Cook and MSG", by Maria Uyehara, Food and Wine
- Innovative Visual Storytelling: "The Protein Problem", by The Associated Press Health and Science Team, The Associated Press
- Investigative Reporting: "The Kids on the Night Shift"; They're Paid Billions to Root Out Child Labor in the U.S. Why Do They Fail?"; "Alone and Exploited, Migrant Children Work Brutal Jobs Acriss the U.S.", by Hannah Dreier, The New York Times
- Personal Essay: "Immigrant Spaghetti", by Farhan Mustafa, The Bitter Southerner
- Personal Essay with Recipes: "Market Volatility" by Julia Langbein, Bon Appétit
- Profile: "Top of the Line", by Hannah Goldfield, The New Yorker
- Emerging Voices: Cuisine Noir/The Global Food and Drink Initiative
- Jonathan Gold Local Voice Award: "Our Brunches, Ourselves: Atlanta's a divided city. Could unity be found on Sunday at 11am?"; "All Together Now: Pop-up collective Stilen Goods counts some of Atlanta's finest young chefs of color among its ranks"; "Less Offal, but Still Pretty Good: Holeman & Finch Public House", Mike Jordan, Atlanta Nagazine
- Craig Claiborne Distinguished Criticism Award: "Jewel Of New Jersey's Palestinian Enclave"; "Is Scarr's the Best Pizza in New York?"; "The Eternal Question of Food Versus Service", by Helen Rosner, The New Yorker
- MFK Fisher Distinguished Writing Award: "The Kids on the Night Shift", by Hannah Dreier, The New York Times Magazine

== 2025 awards ==
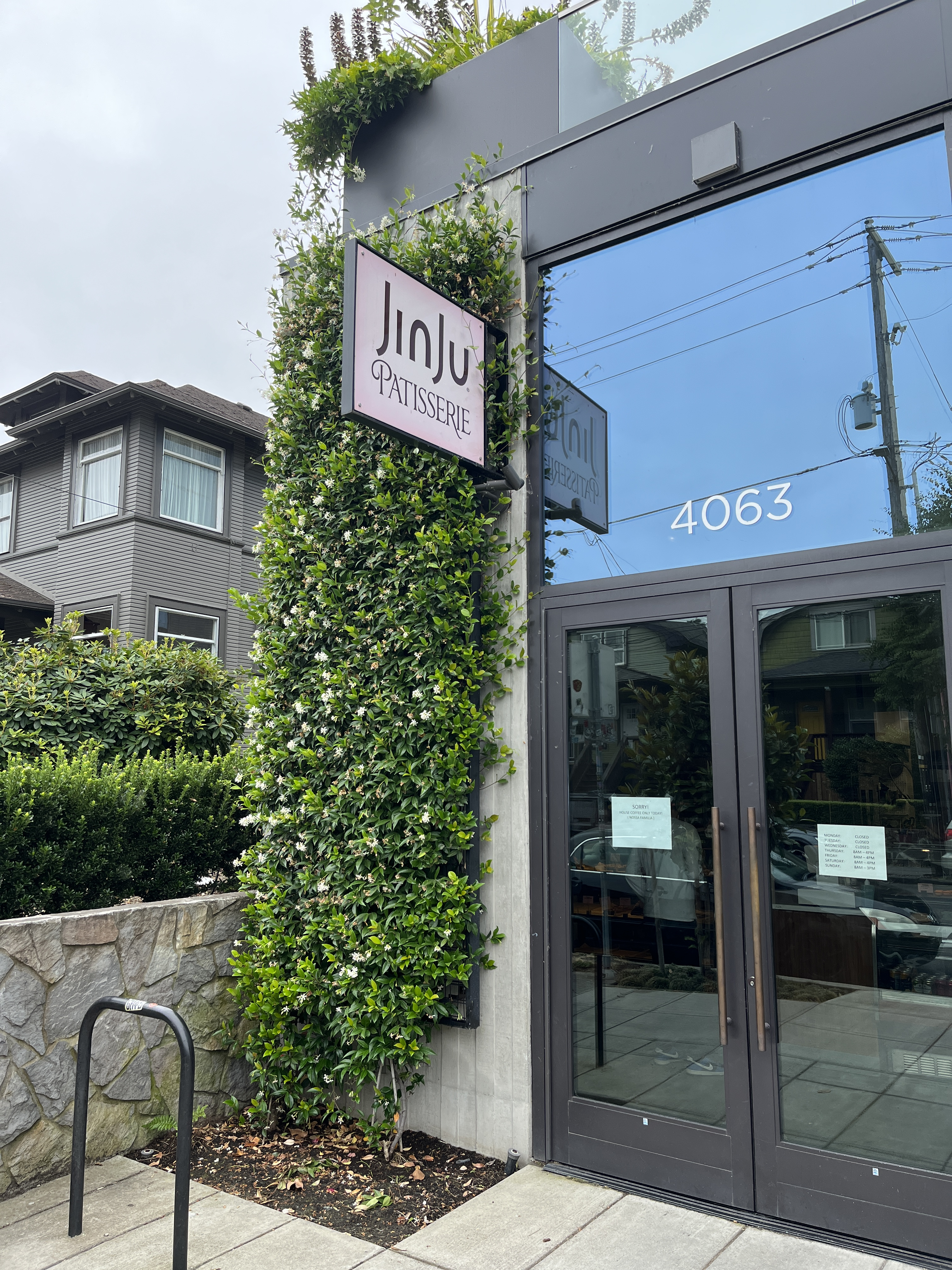
JinJu Patisserie, Portland, Oregon

The 2025 Awards were again held at the Lyric Opera of Chicago for the 35th anniversary of the awards and the 10th anniversary of the ceremony taking place in Chicago. It was hosted by chefs Nyesha Arrington and Andrew Zimmern.

=== Restaurant and Chef Awards ===
- Emerging Chef: Phila Lorn, Mawn, Philadelphia, PA
- Outstanding Pastry Chef or Baker: Cat Cox, Country Bird Bakery, Tulsa, OK
- Outstanding Bakery: JinJu Patisserie, Portland, OR
- Best New Bar: Identidad Cocktail Bar, San Juan, PR
- Outstanding Professional in Cocktail Service: Ignacio Jimenez, Superbueno, New York, NY
- Outstanding Wine and Other Beverages Program: Charleston, Baltimore, MD
- Outstanding Professional in Beverage Service: Arjav Ezekiel, Birdie's, Austin, TX
- Outstanding Bar: Kumiko, Chicago, IL
- Best Chef: California - Jon Yao, Kato, Los Angeles, CA
- Best Chef: Great Lakes (IL, IN, MI, OH) - Noah Sandoval, Oriole, Chicago, IL
- Best Chef: Mid-Atlantic (DC, DE, MD, NJ, PA, VA) - Carlos Delgado, Causa and Amazonia, Washington, D.C.
- Best Chef: Mountain (CO, ID, MT, UT, WY) - Salvador Alamilla, Amano, Caldwell, ID
- Best Chef: Northeast (CT, MA, ME, NH, RI, VT) - Sky Haneul Kim, Gift Horse, Providence, RI
- Best Chef: Northwest & Pacific (AK, HI, OR, WA) - Timothy Wastell, Antica Terra, Amity, OR
- Best Chef: New York State - Vijay Kumar, Semma, New York, NY
- Best Chef: South (AL, AR, FL, LA, MS, PR) - Nando Chang, Itamae AO, Miami, FL
- Best Chef: Southeast (GA, KY, NC, SC, TN, WV) - Jake Howell, Peninsula, Nashville, TN
- Best Chef: Southwest (AZ, NM, NV, OK) - Yotaka Martin, Lom Wong, Phoenix, AZ
- Best Chef: Texas - Thomas Bille, Belly of the Beast, Spring, TX

=== Book Awards ===
- Baking and Desserts: Sift, The Elements of Great Baking by Nicola Lamb
- Beverage with Recipes:The Bartender’s Pantry: A Beverage Handbook for the Universal Bar by Emma Janzen, Jim Meehan, and Bart Sasso
- Beverage without Recipes:.Sake: The Art and Craft of Japan’s National Drink by Yoshiko Ueno-Müller
- Bread: Richard Hart Bread: Intuitive Sourdough Baking by Richard Hart, Henrietta Lovell, and Laurie Woolever
- Food Issues and Advocacy: Ruin Their Crops on the Ground: The Politics of Food in the United States, from the Trail of Tears to School Lunch by Andrea Freeman
- General: Pass the Plate: 100 Delicious, Highly Shareable, Everyday Recipes: A Cookbook by Carolina Gelen
- International: The Balkan Kitchen: Recipes and Stories from the Heart of the Balkans by Irina Janakievska
- Literary Writing: Frostbite: How Refrigeration Changed Our Food, Our Planet, and Ourselves by Nicola Twilley
- Professional and Restaurant: Convivir: Modern Mexican Cuisine in California’s Wine Country by Rogelio Garcia and Andréa Lawson Gray
- Reference, History, and Scholarship: McAtlas: A Global Guide to the Golden Arches by Gary He
- Single Subject: Jang: The Soul of Korean Cooking by Nadia Cho, Mingoo Kang, and Joshua David Stein
- U.S. Foodways: Our South: Black Food Through My Lens by Ashleigh Shanti
- Vegetable-Focused Cooking: Mastering the Art of Plant-Based Cooking by Joe Yonan
- Visuals: McAtlas: A Global Guide to the Golden Arches by Gary He

=== Broadcast Media Awards ===
- Audio Programming: Loading Dock Talks with Chef Preeti Mistry “Cream Pie with Telly Justice”
- Audio Reporting: Post Reports “Bacon: The Best-Kept Secret in Washington”
- Commercial Media: La Mera Mera Tamalera
- Documentary Visual Media: MARCELLA
- Docuseries Visual Media: World Eats Bread
- Instructional Visual Media: G.O.A.T.
- Lifestyle Visual Media: Relish
- Social Media Account: Little Fat Boy
- Travel Visual Media: Drink: A Look Inside the Glass
- Emerging Voice: Mohammed Shaqura, Hamada Shoo
- Broadcast Media Hall of Fame: Martha Stewart

== 2026 awards ==
The 2026 James Beard Awards were presented on June 15, 2026, at the Lyric Opera of Chicago and hosted by Gail Simmons.

=== Restaurant and Chef Awards ===
- Outstanding Restaurateur: Dana Street, Fore Street, Scales, Standard Baking Co., and others, Portland, ME
- Outstanding Chef: Michael Tusk, Quince, San Francisco, CA
- Outstanding Restaurant: Kalaya, Philadelphia, PA
- Emerging Chef: Adrian Torres, Maximo, West University Place, TX
- Best New Restaurant: Lei, New York, NY
- Outstanding Bakery: Wild Crumb, Bozeman, MT
- Outstanding Pastry Chef or Baker: Susan Bae, Moon Rabbit, Washington, D.C.
- Outstanding Hospitality: Providence, Los Angeles, CA
- Outstanding Wine and Other Beverages Program: Kato, Los Angeles, CA
- Outstanding Bar: Scotch Lodge, Portland, OR
- Best New Bar: Loma, Providence, RI
- Outstanding Professional in Beverage Service: Lee Campbell, Borgo, New York, NY
- Outstanding Professional in Cocktail Service: Kevin Diedrich, Pacific Cocktail Haven, San Francisco, CA
- Best Chef: California - Dave Beran, Seline, Santa Monica, CA
- Best Chef: Great Lakes (IL, IN, MI, OH) - Jacob Potashnick, Feld, Chicago, IL
- Best Chef: Mid-Atlantic (DC, DE, MD, NJ, PA, VA) - Jesse Ito, Royal Sushi & Izakaya, Philadelphia, PA
- Best Chef: Midwest (IA, KS, MN, MO, NE, ND, SD, WI) - Loryn Nalic, Balkan Treat Box, Webster Groves, MO
- Best Chef: Mountain (CO, ID, MT, UT, WY) - Penelope Wong, Yuan Wonton, Denver, CO
- Best Chef: New York State - Hooni Kim, Meju, Queens, NY
- Best Chef: Northeast (CT, MA, ME, NH, RI, VT) - Evan Hennessey, Stages, Dover, NH
- Best Chef: Northwest and Pacific (AK, HI, OR, WA) - Ryan Roadhouse, Nodoguro, Portland, OR
- Best Chef: South (AL, AR, FL, LA, MS, PR) - Serigne Mbaye, Dakar NOLA, New Orleans, LA
- Best Chef: Southeast (GA, KY, NC, SC, TN, WV) - Taylor Montgomery, Montgomery Sky Farm, Leicester, NC
- Best Chef: Southwest (AZ, NM, NV, OK) - Sarah Thompson, Casa Playa, Las Vegas, NV
- Best Chef: Texas - Evelyn Garcia and Henry Lu, JŪN, Houston, TX

=== Lifetime Achievement ===
- Nancy Silverton

=== Humanitarian of the Year ===
- No Us Without You LA, Damián Diaz and Othon Nolasco

=== Impact Award Honorees ===
- Coalition for Humane Immigrant Rights (CHIRLA)
- Jon Bon Jovi Soul Kitchen
- Senator Ben Ray Luján
- ReFED
- Southern Smoke Foundation

=== Book Awards ===
- Baking and Desserts: Baking and the Meaning of Life: How to Find Joy in 100 Recipes by Helen Goh
- Beverage with Recipes: Soju Party: How to Drink (and Eat!) Like a Korean by Irene Yoo
- Beverage without Recipes: Wine Pairing for the People: The Communion of Wine, Food, and Culture from Africa and Beyond by Cha McCoy with Layla Schlack
- Food Issues and Advocacy: Eating Behind Bars: Ending the Hidden Punishment of Food in Prison by Leslie Soble, Alex Busansky and Aishatu Yusuf
- General: By Heart: Recipes to Hold Near and Dear by Hailee Catalano
- International: Kin: Caribbean Recipes for the Modern Kitchen by Marie Mitchell
- Literary Writing: The Last Sweet Bite: Stories and Recipes of Culinary Heritage Lost and Found by Michael Shaikh
- Professional and Restaurant: Cook Like A King: Recipes from My California Chinese Kitchen by Melissa King and JJ Goode
- Reference, History, and Scholarship: Nile Nightshade: An Egyptian Culinary History of the Tomato by Anny Gaul
- Single Subject: The Japanese Art of Pickling & Fermenting: Preserving Vegetables and Family Traditions by Yoko Nakazawa
- U.S. Foodways: Umma: A Korean Mom's Kitchen Wisdom and 100 Family Recipes by Sarah Ahn and Nam Soon Ahn
- Vegetable-Focused Cooking: Comida Casera: More Than 100 Vegan Recipes, from Traditional to Modern Mexican Dishes by Dora Ramírez
- Visuals: MUMBAI: A Journey Through Its Kitchens, Streets, and Stories by Sri Bodanapu, Rushina Munshaw Ghildiyal, and Bhavya Pansari, with Nandini Thirani
- Emerging Voice in Books: Ozoz Sokoh, Chop Chop: Cooking the Food of Nigeria
- Book Awards Hall of Fame: Sallie Ann Robinson

=== Broadcast Media Awards ===
- Audio Programming: Heard Podcast: Become a Better Chef, "Lessons Learned"
- Audio Reporting: Buzzkill, "A post-pollinator world"
- Commercial Media: The Theory of Spice
- Documentary Visual Media: Raoul's, A New York Story
- Docuseries Visual Media: Chef's Table: Legends
- Instructional Visual Media: Pati's Mexican Table
- Lifestyle Visual Media: Duck Camp Dinners, The Texas Tour
- Social Media Account: Michael Ligier
- Travel Visual Media: Tucci in Italy
- Emerging Voice in Broadcast Media: Nasim Lahbichi, lahbco
- Broadcast Media Hall of Fame: Pati Jinich

=== Journalism Awards ===
- Beverage: "Spiritual Awakening: Ukraine's black currant brandy tradition was nearly lost to history. Now, one distiller is bringing it back," by Craig Sauers, Wine Enthusiast
- Columns and Newsletters: "The Cruel American Food Aid Crisis"; "A Tufts Student Abducted, Before Iftar"; "Immigrant Restaurant Workers Are Not Criminals," by Ryan Sutton, The Lo Times
- Craig Claiborne Distinguished Criticism Award: "The Great Salt Shake Up"; "The Worst Sandwich Is Back"; "Elon Musk’s Utterly Mundane Vision of Dining," by Ellen Cushing, The Atlantic
- Dining and Travel: "Rising Up: Hong Kong Looks Inward to Reinvent Itself," by Francis Lam, Condé Nast Traveler
- Feature Reporting: "Caught! A historic, family-run restaurant in Biloxi, Mississippi, made its name selling freshly caught seafood. Then the feds showed up with an extraordinary accusation: The fish were a fraud." by Boyce Upholt, Food & Environment Reporting Network and Inc. Magazine
- Food Coverage in a General Interest Publication: Roads & Kingdoms
- Foodways: "The hunt for the bean pie street sellers of legend, and how this dessert is a symbol of liberation for many Black Muslims," by Ahmed Ali Akbar, Chicago Tribune
- Health and Wellness: "The MAHA Trend in Groceries Will Backfire"; "Brace Yourself for Watery Mayo and Spiky Ice Cream"; "The Cleaner Way to Get Ripped," by Yasmin Tayag, The Atlantic
- Home Cooking: "Going Green," by Elizabeth Mervosh, Food & Wine
- Investigative Reporting: "California's Child Farmworkers: Exhausted, Underpaid and Toiling in Toxic Fields"; "Lax Oversight, Few Inspections Leave Child Farmworkers Exposed to Toxic Pesticides," by Robert Lopez, Capital & Main and Los Angeles Times
- Jonathan Gold Local Voice Award: "These street vendors used their aguas frescas to fight tear gas at anti-ICE protests"; "Follow the red sauce to Burbank’s best Italian deli"; "After the Eaton fire, Bernee restaurant closed for good. This weekend it’s reborn as Betsy," by Stephanie Breijo, Los Angeles Times
- MFK Fisher Distinguished Writing Award: "Schmear Campaign," Lauren Collins, The New Yorker
- Narrative Photography: "The hunt for life-giving 'country food' in the Canadian Arctic," by Monica Herndon, The Philadelphia Inquirer
- Personal Essay: "Intuitive Eating: On Poison, Pleasure, and Trust," by Erica Berry, Orion Magazine
- Personal Essay with Recipes, "The Blueberry Oatmeal That Got Us Through Grief, Then Birth," by Hali Bey Ramdene, Bon Appétit
- Profile: "No Papers, Just Peaches," Sithara Ranasinghe, Cake Zine
- Emerging Voice in Journalism: Jasmine Michel
