= Robynne =

Robynne is a feminine form of the given name Robert. Notable people with the name include:

- Robynne Maii (fl. from 2013), Hawaiian chef and restaurateur
- Robynne Quiggin (fl. from 2000), Indigenous Australian lawyer and social justice advocate
- Robynne Tweedale (born 1996), British figure skater, e.g., paired with Joseph Buckland and Steven Adcock
