= Vince Nguyen =

Chef

- Occupations: Chef; restaurateur

Vince Nguyen is an American chef in Portland, Oregon. He opened the Vietnamese restaurant Berlu.

== Early life ==
Nguyen was raised in Southern California.

== See also ==
- James Beard Foundation Award: 2020s
- List of chefs
