= Grey Sweater =

Restaurant in Oklahoma City, Oklahoma, U.S.

- Interactive map of Grey Sweater

Restaurant information
- Location: 100 NE 4th St, Oklahoma, Oklahoma City, 73104, United States
- Coordinates: 35°28′18″N 97°30′33″W
- Website: www.greysweaterokc.com

Grey Sweater is a restaurant in Oklahoma City, in the U.S. state of Oklahoma. The business earned Andrew Black a James Beard Foundation Award in the Best Chef: Southwest category.

Chef Black also owns The Black Walnut (est. 2019) and Gilded Acorn (est. 2022) in Oklahoma City.

== See also ==
- James Beard Foundation Award: 2020s
