= Yoli Tortilleria =

Bakery in Kansas City, U.S.

- Interactive map of Yoli Tortilleria

Restaurant information
- Food type: Mexican tortilla bakery
- Location: Kansas City, Missouri, United States
- Coordinates: 39°05′35″N 94°35′33″W

Yoli Tortilleria is a Mexican tortilla bakery in Kansas City, Missouri, in the United States. The business earned a James Beard Foundation Award in the Outstanding Bakery category.

== See also ==
- James Beard Foundation Award: 2020s
- List of bakeries
- List of Mexican restaurants
