= Dora Ramírez =

- Born: Ciudad Acuña, Mexico
- Education: The Culinary Institute of America (New York)
- Occupations: chef; recipe developer; photographer; cookbook author
- Writing career
- Subject: Plant-based/Vegan cookbooks
- Notable works: Comida Casera: More Than 100 Vegan Recipes, from Traditional to Modern Mexican Dishes (2025)
- Notable awards: James Beard Foundation Award
- Website: dorastable.com

Dora Ramírez is a Mexican chef, cookbook author, and photographer who specializes in plant-based/vegan Mexican cuisine. Her cookbook, Comida Casera: More Than 100 Vegan Recipes, from Traditional to Modern Mexican Dishes, won the 2026 James Beard Foundation Award.

== Early life and education ==
Ramírez was born and raised in Ciudad Acuña, Mexico. Her family owned and operated the "Los Tacos Grill" restaurant, and she grew up eating all of her meals and working there after school. Her time in the restaurant did not spark an interest in cooking, however. Instead, after graduating from high school, she spent a year in Mexico City on a "spiritual quest", as a missionary. It was there that she developed an interest in cooking while working with nuns in the kitchen.

She then left the mission and joined The Culinary Institute of America (New York), graduating in 2006.

== Career ==
After graduation, Ramírez worked in hotel restaurants. She quit working after the birth of her first child, and thought her professional career was over. After seven years as a stay-at-home mother, she started a recipe blog, which led to work as a cooking teacher and personal chef. Eventually she turned to a vegan/plant-based diet after health issues led her to watch the 2011 documentary Forks Over Knives. When her mother also began to experience chronic health problems, Ramírez tried to convince her to switch to a plant-based diet. In order to do so, she started to reinvent family dishes in response to her mother's question: "Can’t you make this more Mexican?" She then "rebranded" her recipe blog to "vegan Mexican," and started to work with "an organization looking for a vegan bilingual food photographer and recipe developer."

=== Cookbook ===
In her first cookbook, Comida Casera: More Than 100 Vegan Recipes, from Traditional to Modern Mexican Dishes, Ramírez "veganizes her family recipes, traditional Mexican recipes and partnered with Mexico’s indigenous cooks to share their naturally plant-based recipes." It won the 2026 James Beard Foundation Award, a first for the San Antonio food industry.

== Awards and honors ==
Year	Awards and Honors	Event
2026	James Beard Foundation Award	James Beard Foundation Award: Vegetable Focused Cooking

== Cookbook ==
- Comida Casera: More Than 100 Vegan Recipes, from Traditional to Modern Mexican Dishes. Balance, 2025. ISBN 978-0306832819.
