= Warda Pâtisserie =

Bakery in Detroit, Michigan, U.S.

- Interactive map of Warda Pâtisserie

Restaurant information
- Coordinates: 42°21′1″N 83°3′41″W

Warda Pâtisserie is a bakery in Detroit, Michigan. The business earned Warda Bouguettaya a James Beard Foundation Award in the Best Pastry Chef category.

== See also ==
- James Beard Foundation Award: 2020s
