= South Philly Barbacoa =

Restaurant in Philadelphia, Pennsylvania, U.S.

Coordinates: 39.93534°N 75.15878°W

- Interactive map of South Philly Barbacoa

Restaurant information
- Location: Philadelphia, Pennsylvania, United States
- Website: www.barbacoaphilly.com

South Philly Barbacoa is a Mexican restaurant in the Italian Market in Passyunk Square, Philadelphia, Pennsylvania. The business earned Cristina Martinez a James Beard Foundation Award in the Best Chef: Mid-Atlantic category.

== See also ==
- James Beard Foundation Award: 2020s
