= Christina Nguyen =

American chef and restaurateur

- Education: Self-taught
- Years active: 2014–present
- Spouse: Birk Grudem
- Culinary career
- Cooking style: Venezuelan street food, Southeast Asian street food
- Current restaurant(s): Hola Arepa, Minneapolis (2014–present); Hai Hai, Minneapolis (2018–present)
- Award(s) won: James Beard Foundation Award, Best Chef: Midwest 2024

Christina Nguyen is an American chef and restaurateur. In 2024, she won the James Beard Foundation Award for Best Chef: Midwest.

== Early life ==
Nguyen's parents, who both grew up in Saigon, Vietnam, immigrated separately in 1975 to the United States as refugees. They met as students at the University of Minnesota. Nguyen has a brother.

Nguyen is self-taught.

== Career ==
Nguyen opened a food truck, Hola Arepa, in 2014. She opened a bricks-and-mortar restaurant also called Hola Arepa, which serves Venezuelan street food, in Minneapolis.

Nguyen opened Hai Hai in Minneapolis, which serves Southeast Asian street foods, in the late 2010s. The restaurant had previously been a night club. National Geographic said it had 'rocketed to prominence as a "new-school” Asian-inspired restaurant. Its menu is almost entirely unlike any of its peers—it’s filled with under-the-radar dishes you can’t order anywhere else, and evolves constantly'.

== Recognition ==
Nguyen won the James Beard James Beard Foundation Award for Best Chef: Midwest in 2024. She had been nominated for the award several times and had been a finalist for the award previously.

== Personal life ==
Nguyen is married to Birk Grudem.
