= Richard Hart (baker) =

British baker and author

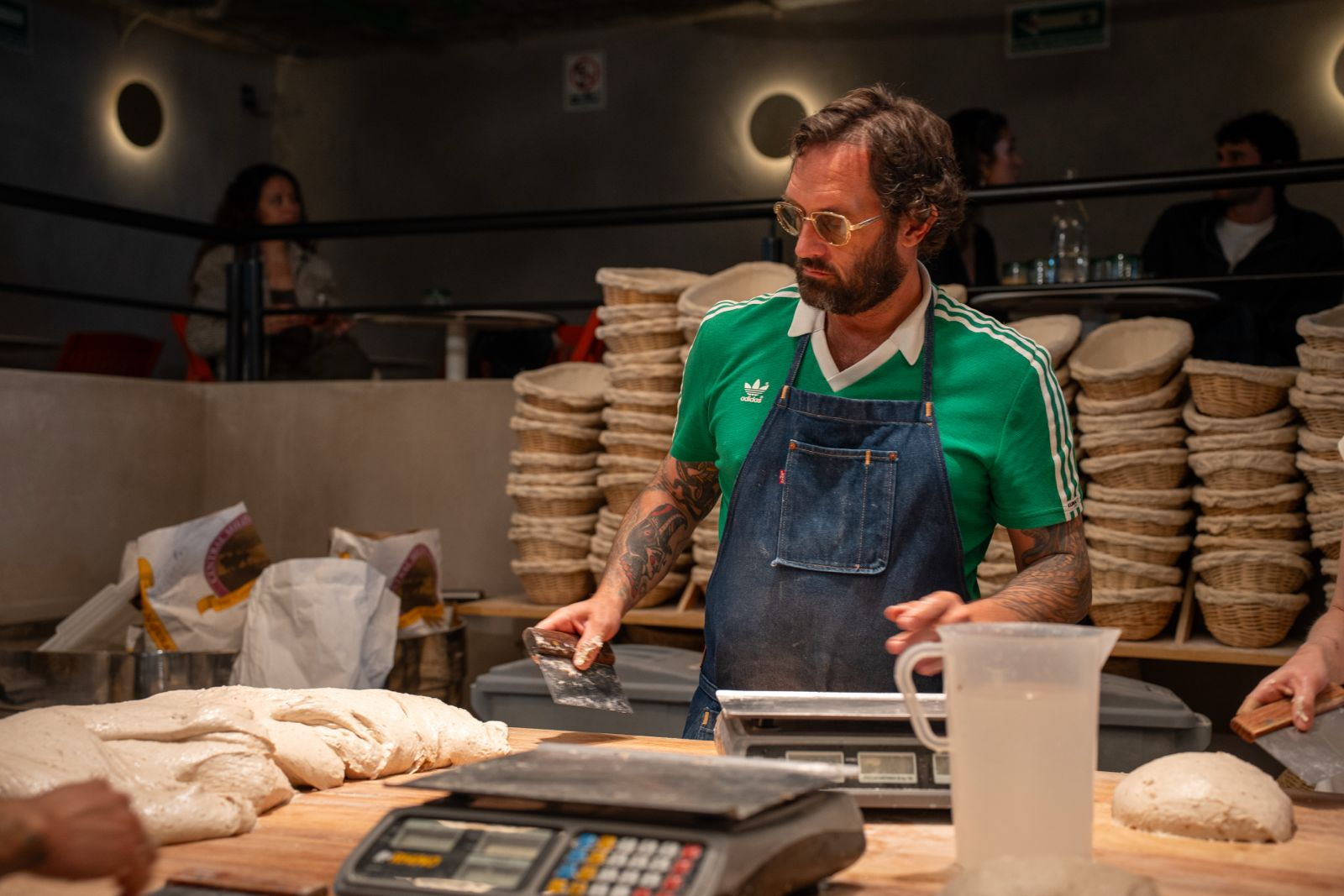
- Born: 1977 (age 48–49); London
- Occupation: Baker
- Website: richardhartbaker.com

Richard Hart (London, 1977) is a baker and an author. His book Richard Hart Bread: Intuitive Sourdough Baking won the 2025 James Beard Book Award in the category bread.

== Career ==
=== California ===
Hart started his career as a chef in London where he worked with Gordon Ramsay. In 2007 he moved to the United States to work at Ubuntu. Hart wanted to specialize in bread and moved to Della Fattoria in Petaluma where he met Kathleen Weber. Then he moved to Tartine Bakery where he served as head baker for seven years.

=== Copenhagen: Hart Bageri ===
In 2018 he established Hart Bageri in Copenhagen with partner René Redzepi. Hart became one of Denmark's most popular bakers.

=== Mexico City: Green Rhino ===
Hart moved to Mexico City in 2023 with his spouse Henrietta Lovell, founder of the Rare Tea Company, where he set up Green Rhino in 2025. In a 2025 interview, he declared that Mexico "does not really have a bread culture" and describes tortas made with bolillo as a product of "horrendous industrial bread", which sparked strong reactions from users and defenders of traditional Mexican baking. In December, Hart apologized publicly for his comments.

In that same year, Hart announced the opening of a bakery at Claridge's in his native London.

== Awards ==
- 2025 James Beard Book Award for Richard Hart Bread: Intuitive Sourdough Baking, by Richard Hart and Laurie Woolever, with Henrietta Lovell.

== In popular culture ==
In The Bear season 2 Marcus travels to Copenhagen and gets inspired by Chef Luca; a bakery chef loosely inspired in Richard Hart's and René Redzepi's work.
