= Joanne Lee Molinaro =

American attorney, food blogger, and author

- Born: Joanne Lee; April 24, 1979 (age 47); Chicago, Illinois, U.S.
- Education: University of Illinois Urbana-Champaign (BA); University of Chicago (JD)
- Occupations: Attorney; Vegan/Plant-based food blogger; author; social media influencer
- Writing career
- Genre: Plant-based/Vegan cookbooks
- Notable works: The Korean Vegan Cookbook: Reflections and Recipes from Omma's Kitchen
- Notable awards: James Beard Foundation Award

YouTube information
- Channel: The Korean Vegan
- Subscribers: 1.41 million
- Views: 509 million
- Last updated: August 5th, 2026
- Website: thekoreanvegan.com

Joanne Lee Molinaro (born April 24, 1979) is an American attorney, author, and blogger who writes about vegan and plant-based food. Her cookbook, The Korean Vegan Cookbook: Reflections and Recipes from Omma's Kitchen (2021), won the 2022 James Beard Foundation Award.

== Early life, education, and early career ==
Molinaro was born on April 24, 1979, in Chicago, Illinois. Her parents were born in present-day North Korea, and escaped when they were young. She was raised in Skokie, Illinois, with her younger brother Jaesun. She earned her B.A. in English from the University of Illinois at Urbana-Champaign, and J.D. from the University of Chicago Law School.

Molinaro was previously a firm partner at Foley & Lardner LLP's office in Chicago, where she was a member of multiple practice groups in the firm, including Bankruptcy & Business Reorganizations. As a specialized practitioner in bankruptcy, she defended the liquidating trustee against almost $1 billion in claims in the second-largest Ponzi scheme case in United States history. She has also prosecuted frauds, avoidance actions, and breaches.

== Vegan career ==
Molinaro started her food blog, The Korean Vegan, in 2016, which consists of recipes that re-imagine traditional Korean meals through plant-based adaptations. She began posting to TikTok in 2020 under the same name, and sharing recipes along with personal stories that focus on how her family escaped North Korea and adjusted to life in the United States, how it feels to be a Korean woman living in the diaspora, her law journey, and her abusive first marriage. She also includes discussions on racism, sexism, and xenophobia. She has been featured in numerous publications, including CNN, CBS, The Atlantic, and the Food Network.

Her first cookbook, The Korean Vegan, won the James Beard Foundation Award: Vegetable Focused Cooking in 2022. The New York Times listed it as one of the best cookbooks of 2021, Runner's World named The Korean Vegan one of the "6 Best Vegan Cookbooks to Get More Plants in Your Diet" in 2022, and Food & Wine named it one of "the 20 Best Vegan Cookbooks for Every Type of Meal" in 2024.

Molinaro launched a vegan K-beauty brand in 2025. Her second cookbook, The Korean Vegan: Homemade, (2025) was nominated for a James Beard award in 2026.

== Awards and honors ==
VegNews listed Molinaro as one of the "37 Creative Chefs Crafting the Future of Vegan Food" in 2023, and named The Korean Vegan one of the "Top 100 Vegan Cookbooks of All Time" in 2024.

Year	Awards and Honors	Event
2023	Streamy Award	13th Streamy Awards: Creator Honor
2023	Food & Wine Game Changers for 2023	Food & Wine
2022	James Beard Foundation Award	James Beard Foundation Award: Vegetable Focused Cooking for The Korean Vegan Cookbook: Reflections and Recipes from Omma's Kitchen.
2026	Finalist (nominated)	James Beard Foundation Award: Vegetable Focused Cooking for The Korean Vegan: Homemade: Recipes and Stories from My Kitchen.

== Cookbooks ==
- The Korean Vegan Cookbook: Reflections and Recipes from Omma's Kitchen (Penguin Publishing Group, October 2021, ISBN 9780593084274)
- The Korean Vegan: Homemade: Recipes and Stories from My Kitchen (Penguin Publishing Group, October 2025, ISBN 9780593541296)

== Personal life ==
Molinaro resides in Chicago and California, and has run several half and full marathons.

Shortly after graduating from law school, Molinaro married her first husband. While his name is unknown to the public, she has described the marriage as emotionally abusive. They have since divorced. On July 21, 2018, she married Chicago-born concert pianist and music professor Anthony Molinaro in Rome.
