= Hannah Che =

American pianist and writer

- Born: Ann Arbor, Michigan, U.S.
- Education: B.M, M.M. Shepherd School of Music, Rice University; Guangzhou Vegetarian Culinary School, Guangdong, China
- Occupations: food writer; cookbook author; pianist
- Writing career
- Subject: Plant-based/Vegan cookbooks
- Notable work: The Vegan Chinese Kitchen
- Notable awards: James Beard Foundation Award

Hannah Che is an American plant-based/vegan chef, cookbook author, and food writer. Her cookbook, The Vegan Chinese Kitchen, won the 2023 James Beard Foundation Award.

== Early life and education ==
Che was born in Ann Arbor, Michigan, to immigrant parents from China. When she was 9, her father's work took them to Shenzhen, China for three years before returning to the United States. She trained as a pianist at Shepherd School of Music, Rice University, receiving both a B.M. and M.M. She is also a graduate of the Guangzhou Vegetarian Culinary School in China, where she studied vegetarian cooking.

== Career ==
Che states that after reading Eating Animals by Jonathan Safran Foer, she "chose to shift to plant-based eating for health, environmental, and ethical reasons." She then began to study "other culinary traditions, like plant-based Thai and Mediterranean cuisine." She states that she learned that "plant-based eating is a long-standing tradition in Chinese cuisine."

She created the recipe blog, "The Plant-Based Wok," and began working in restaurants. She worked as a cook in American Michelin-starred restaurants, was a wok chef at Din Tai Fung, and developed "a vegan Chinese tasting menu pop-up called Surong" in Portland, Oregon. She currently lives in Dali, Yunnan, China.

== Book ==
The New York Times and The Washington Post named her first cookbook, The Vegan Chinese Kitchen (2022), one of the Best Cookbooks of 2022, and the Food Network listed it as one of the “10 Best New Vegan Cookbooks” for 2023. VegNews listed it as one of the "Top 100 Vegan Cookbooks of All Time" in 2024.

It won the 2023 James Beard Foundation Award and 2023 International Association of Culinary Professionals Julia Child First Book Award.

== Awards and honors ==
Year	Awards and Honors	Event
2023	James Beard Foundation Award	James Beard Foundation Award: Vegetable Focused Cooking
2023	IACP	Julia Child First Book Award, Presented By The Julia Child Foundation for Gastronomy and the Culinary Arts

== Cookbook ==
- The Vegan Chinese Kitchen. Clarkson Potter, 2022. ISBN 978-0593139707.
