= Sly Fox Den Too =

Restaurant in Charlestown, Rhode Island, U.S.

- Interactive map of Sly Fox Den Too

Restaurant information
- Coordinates: 41.42761°N 71.64648°W

Sly Fox Den Too was an Indigenous restaurant in Charlestown, Rhode Island. The menu included three-sisters succotash, venison sandwiches, and smoked fish. The business earned Sherry Pocknett a James Beard Foundation Award in the Best Chef: Northeast category. Sly Fox Den Too closed in January 2025.

== See also ==
- James Beard Foundation Award: 2020s
