= Country Bird Bakery =

Bakery in Tulsa, Oklahoma, U.S.

- Interactive map of Country Bird Bakery

Restaurant information
- Location: Tulsa, Oklahoma, United States
- Coordinates: 36.156480°N 95.967405°W

Country Bird Bakery, founded in 2022, is a bakery in Tulsa, Oklahoma, the United States.

== History ==
Country Bird Bakery was founded by Cat Cox in 2022. In June 2025, Cox was awarded the Outstanding Pastry Chef or Baker in the 2025 James Beard Foundation Restaurant and Chef Awards.

== Reception ==
In 2024, the business was included in The New York Times's list of the 22 best bakeries in the U.S.

== See also ==
- List of bakeries
