= Bar Leather Apron =

Bar in Honolulu, Hawaii, U.S.

- Interactive map of Bar Leather Apron

Restaurant information
- Established: January 2016
- Owners: Justin Park; Tom Park
- Location: 745 Fort Street, Suite 127A, Honolulu, Hawaii, 96813, United States
- Coordinates: 21°18′28″N 157°51′49″W
- Seating capacity: 30
- Reservations: Required
- Head bartender: Justin Park
- Website: barleatherapron.com

Bar Leather Apron is a cocktail bar in Honolulu, Hawaii, United States. It was founded by Justin Park, a mixologist, and Tom Park, a shoe retailer and opened in January 2016. Modeled on small bars in Japan, it serves variations on classic cocktails in a space that holds about 30 people. Playboy named it one of the nation's best new bars in its first year, and it has since appeared on the North America's 50 Best Bars list. In 2023, it won the James Beard Foundation Award for Outstanding Bar, the first national James Beard Award won by a Hawaii business.

== History ==
Bar Leather Apron was founded by Justin Park and Tom Park (no relation), both Hawaiian business owners. Justin Park was a mixologist and owned a restaurant in Honolulu's Chinatown, while Tom Park owned a shoe store in Waikīkī. The bar opened to the public in January 2016. The bar's primary focus, according to the founders, was to offer twists on classic cocktails. It was modeled after hidden speakeasies in Japan, primarily those in the Osaka region, and only has space for around 30 people inside at a time. In order to manage the small space, the bar initially required reservations by email.

In 2021, the bar collaborated with chef Colin Hazama to create a new food menu. The following year, Justin and Tom Park opened a second bar, Bar Maze.

== Recognition ==
Bar Leather Apron received positive reviews locally upon its opening, with reviewers highlighting the aesthetic and the creativity of the drinks. It also received mild criticism for the cost of the cocktails (at the time of opening, most cocktails cost between $18 and $20). In its first year of operation it was named one of the "Best New Bars in America" by Playboy. In 2020 it was nominated for The Spirits Business "Spirited Awards." In 2022 it was ranked 42nd on The World's 50 Best Bars list.

In 2023, Bar Leather Apron was the only Hawaii restaurant to make the finals of the James Beard Foundation Awards. It won the Outstanding Bar award and became the first Hawaii institution to win a national James Beard Award.

== See also ==
- James Beard Foundation Award: 2020s
- List of restaurants in Hawaii
