= The Deer and the Dove =

Restaurant in Decatur, Georgia, U.S.

Coordinates: 33°46′28″N 84°17′42.5″W

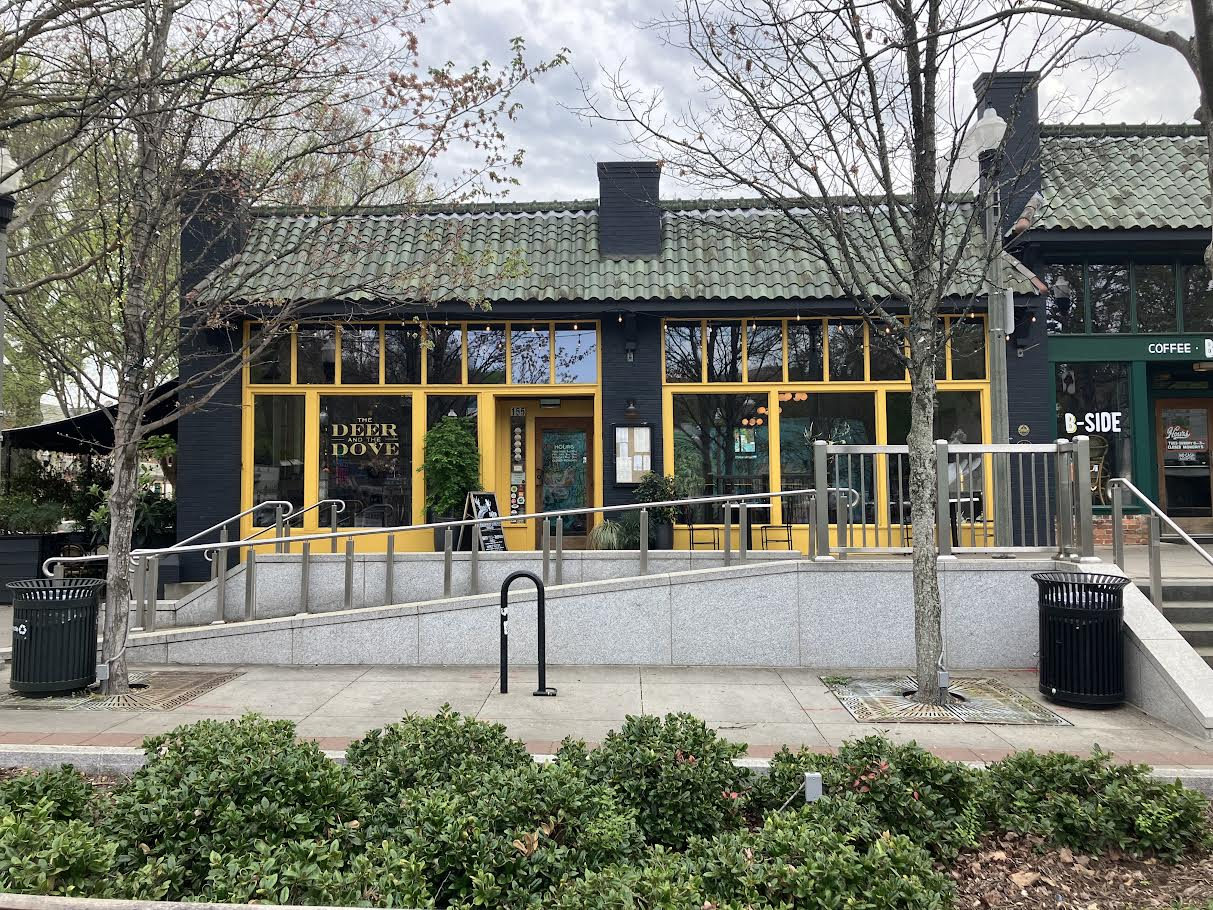
- Interactive map of The Deer and the Dove

Restaurant information
- Location: Decatur, Georgia, United States

The Deer and the Dove is a restaurant in Decatur, Georgia, United States. The business earned Terry Koval a James Beard Foundation Award in the Best Chef: Southeast category.

== See also ==
- James Beard Foundation Award: 2020s
