= Daniel Leader =

American bread baker

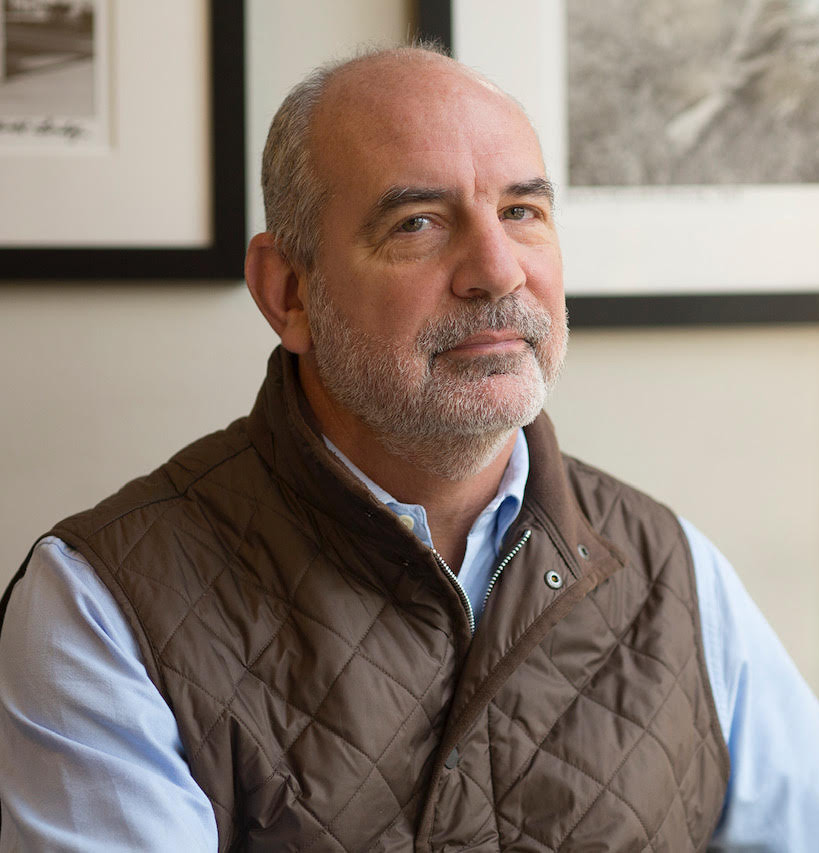
- Education: University of Wisconsin; Culinary Institute of America
- Occupations: Artisan Bread Baker & Author
- Notable work: Bread Alone; Local Breads; Living Bread; Simply Great Breads
- Awards: James Beard Foundation Award in the "Baking and Desserts" book category (2020)

Daniel Leader is an American artisan bread baker. He is the founder of Bread Alone Bakery, an influential bakery in organic and artisan bread making.

== Education ==
Leader studied philosophy at the University of Wisconsin. He then went on to the Culinary Institute of America in Hyde Park, New York. Upon graduating from the CIA Leader worked in several high end restaurants in New York Ccity including Le Veau d'Or, The Palace, La Grenouille, Raoul's, The Water Club.

In 1983, he founded his bakery in Boiceville, New York. The bakery went on to expand to several other New York locations, Woodstock in 1993, Rhinebeck in 2000, and Kingston in 2015. Bread Alone breads can also be found at hundreds of markets in the Hudson Valley, New York City and the tristate area.

He has been on the board of the New York State Agriculture Commissioner's Organic Food Advisory Committee. Leader is also on the advisory board of the Bank of Green County and the Development board of SUNY New Paltz. He has taught at The French Culinary Institute, The Culinary Institute of America and The Institute of Culinary Education.

His books Bread Alone and Local Breads both won the prestigious IACP award for best baking book.

His book, Living Bread: Tradition and Innovation in Artisan Bread Making, was the 2020 James Beard Foundation Award winner in the "Baking and Desserts" book category.

== Books ==
- Living Bread: Tradition and Innovation in Artisan Bread Making with Lauren Chattman Avery 2019
- Simply Great Breads: Sweet and Savory Yeasted Treats from America's Premier Artisan Baker with Lauren Chattman Taunton Press, 2011
- Panini Express with Lauren Chattman (Taunton Press)
- Local Breads: Sourdough and Whole-Grain Recipes from Europe's Best Artisan Bakers W. W. Norton & Company 2007
- Bread Alone with Judith Blahnik William Morrow Cookbooks, 1993
