= Jesse Ito =

Japanese Korean American Chef and Restaurateur

- Education: Rutgers School of Business – Camden
- Occupations: Cook, restaurateur
- Awards: James Beard Foundation Award (2026)

Jesse Ito (born circa 1989) is a Japanese Korean American chef and restauranteur. In 2026, Ito was awarded the James Beard Award for Best Chef in the Mid-Atlantic region.

== Early Life and Education ==
Ito was born circa 1989 to Massaharu Ito and Yeonghui Ito. Ito's parents immigrated to the United States in the 1970s. His parents operated a sushi restaurant in South Jersey called Fuji that opened in 1979. Previously, Ito's father Massaharu Ito worked at Sagami, a Japanese restaurant located in Collingswood, New Jersey. Ito had worked at Fuji throughout his childhood and early adulthood with his family and learned how to make sushi from his father.

In 2012, Ito graduated from Rutgers School of Business–Camden with a degree in marketing.

== Career ==
In 2015, Ito and his parents sold Fuji in order to start a new business. Ito opened his restaurant Royal Sushi & Izakaya on September 23, 2016.

In 2017 and 208, Ito was a semifinalist for the James Beard Award for Rising Star Chef of the Year. In 2019, Ito was a finalist for the James Beard Award for Rising Star Chef of the Year but did not win. Ito, along with the other finalists, received a one-on-one makeover session with stylist Tan France that was filmed as promotional content for the awards. In 2020, Ito was a semifinalist again for the James Beard Award for Rising Star Chef of the Year.

Ito was a finalist for the James Beard Award for Best Chef: Mid-Atlantic in 2022, 2023, 2024, and 2025. In 2024, Ito was the only chef from the Philadelphia area to be named a finalist that year.

In 2025, Ito opened another restaurant called "dancerobot" with Justin Bacharach, who was the chef at Royal Sushi & Izakaya.

In 2026, Ito finally won the James Beard Award for Best Chef in the Mid-Atlantic region.
