= Nicola Lamb =

British pastry chef and author

Nicola Lamb is a British pastry chef and cookery book author.

Lamb trained with Dominique Ansel, Yotam Ottolenghi, and Little Bread Pedlar.

In May 2024, Ebury Press published Sift: The Elements of Great Baking. Later in 2024, an Americanized version was published in the US and Canada. In November 2024, it was The Times and Sunday Times food book of the year. Eater.com called it "a Deep, Delicious Dive Into the How and Why of Baking".

Lamb runs "Kitchen Projects", a baking newsletter.

Lamb's recipes and writing have been featured in Serious Eats, The Guardian, Olive, Vogue Magazine, and ES Magazine. She continues to host sell-out pastry parties with her pop-up bakery, lark! and has collaborated with chefs including Verena Lochmuller of Ottolenghi Test Kitchen, Toklas Bakery, Farro, Lannan, Soft & Swirly, and Kossoffs.

In 2025, Lamb’s debut book Sift: The Elements of Great Baking was awarded the James Beard Foundation Book Award in the Baking and Desserts category.
