= Jim Embry =

American activist

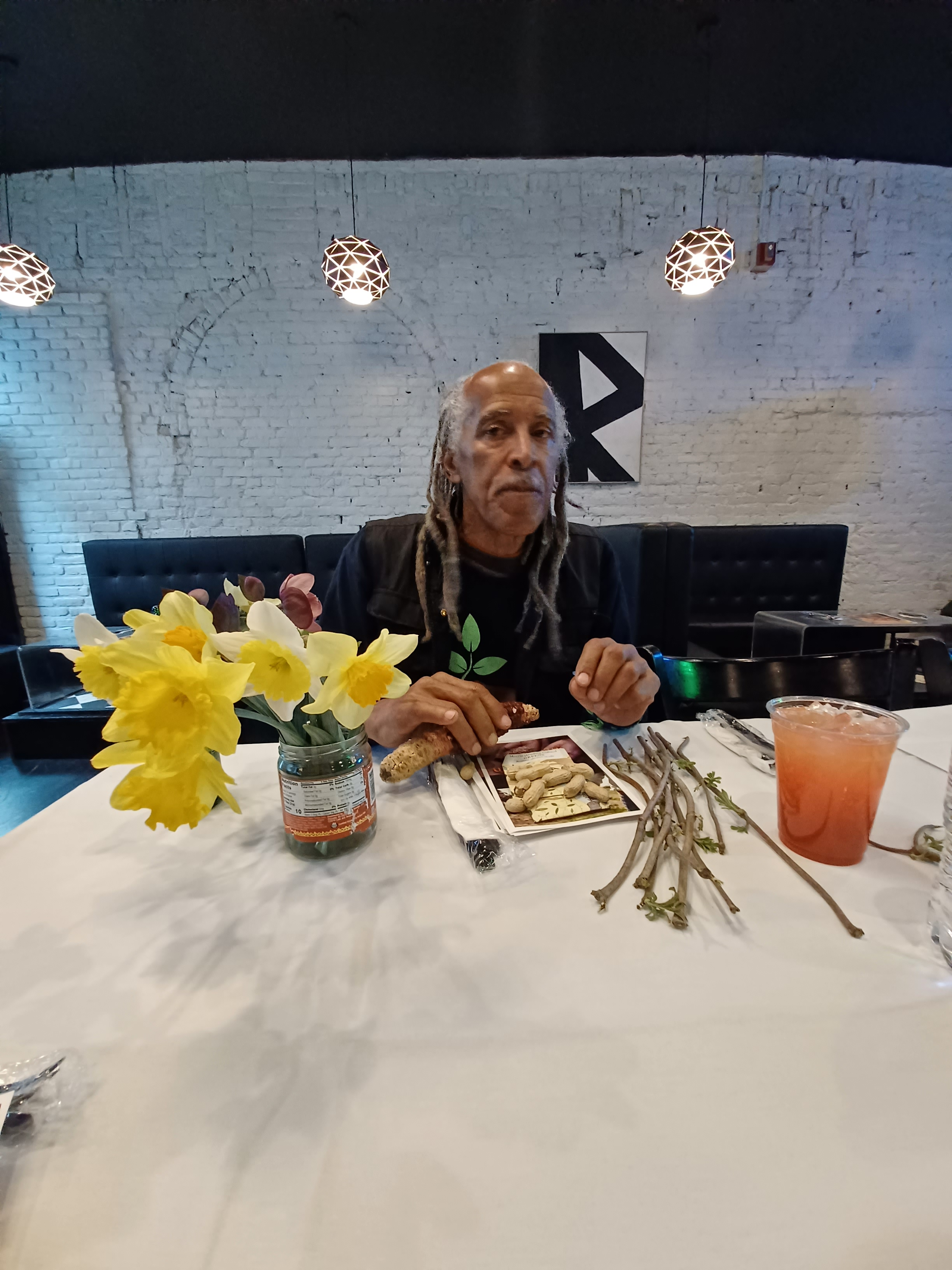
- Born: James Gilbert Embry; April 23, 1949 (age 76); Richmond, Kentucky
- Occupations: Educator, farmer, eco-activist, public speaker
- Website: http://sustainlex.org

Jim Embry (born James Gilbert Embry; April 23, 1949, in Richmond, Kentucky) is an American civil rights activist, environmental advocate, educator, and founder of the Sustainable Communities Network. With a career spanning over five decades, he has been involved in social justice, sustainable agriculture, and local food systems. In addition to his activism, he is a public speaker, writer, photographer, and scuba diver. In 2006, he founded the Sustainable Communities Network, a nonprofit organization focused on building environmentally and socially resilient communities, where he continues to serve as director.

== Early life ==
Embry comes from an African American activist family. He is the grandson and great-grandson of farmers and community activists. His ancestors were enslaved Africans that were brought to Kentucky in the 1800s.

In April 1968, Embry attended Dr. Martin Luther King Jr.'s funeral and served as funeral marshal.

== Education ==
1974 – Bachelor of Science, Zoology, University of Kentucky

== Career ==
On March 5, 1964, as a teenager, Embry attended the march on Frankfort, Kentucky, a call for legislation to end discrimination, and segregation. It was an interracial protest with around 10,000 Kentuckians. Martin Luther King Jr. and Jackie Robinson participated, along with other civil rights activists and the folk singers Peter, Paul, and Mary.

In 1967, he attended the University of Kentucky. While attending the University of Kentucky, he was involved with the Black Student Union. He participated in what were called "bitch-ins". Embry says the "bitch-in" gatherings were where students met and had discussions of issues such as the Vietnam War and the killings in Cambodia. They had a student newspaper, the Kentucky Kernel. In a 1978 oral history interview, he mentioned that at the Black Student gatherings, they talked about student representation on the University of Kentucky Board of Trustees. He mentioned also that they advocated for banning the song "Dixie" from being played at football games and other campus events.

In 2001, Embry moved to Detroit to be the Director of the James and Grace Lee Boggs Center to Nurture Community Leadership. In Detroit, his work included urban agriculture and food justice.

In 2018, he was a founding member of the worker co-operative Wild Fig Bookstore.

Embry's work is local, national, and International in advocating for sustainable communities. He participates in international forums such as the World Social Forum in Italy and Terra Madre/International Slow Food Gatherings as a six-time US delegate.

Embry studied organic farming in Cuba.

Embry is a member of the Black Farmers and Urban Growers conference. He is the state governor of Slow Food USA for Kentucky. He is a member of Black Soil, Good Foods Cooperative, and other food justice organizations. As a writer and photographer, Embry has contributed articles and photographs to We Are Each Other's Harvest, Sustainable World Source Book, Encyclopedia of Northern Kentucky, Kentucky African American Encyclopedia, Latino Studies, Biodynamics Journal, African American Heritage Guide, Stella Natura, and other publications.

Embry's photographs have appeared in exhibitions, books, hospitals, galleries, and magazines.

== Awards ==
- 2009 Chrysalis House Outstanding Service award, women healing from drug abuse
- 2014 Environmental Commission award for garden project for women experiencing domestic violence
- 2018 Honored at the North American Association for Environmental Education Conference (NAAEE) the Rosa Parks and Grace Lee Boggs Award for leadership in environmental justice, ecological education and advocacy
- 2018 Snail Blazer Award Slow Food Nations
- Audrey Grevious Award by Carter G. Woodson Academy
- 2023 James Beard Leadership Awards

== See also ==
- "Dr. George Washington Carver & the Food and Environmental Justice Movement". Food Justice Exhibit at WVU.
- "We are the Seeds of our Ancestors' Dreams". Ancestral Vibrations Guide our Connection to the Land. 15 October 2019.
- "The Relevance of the Legacy of George Washington Carver". Political Ecology.
