= Sky Haneul Kim =

South Korean Chef

- Education: Johnson & Wales University
- Awards: James Beard Foundation Award (Best Chef: Northeast (CT, MA, ME, NH, RI, VT), 2025); James Beard Foundation Award (Semifinalist, 2024)

Sky Haneul Kim is a South Korean chef and James Beard Award winner. Kim was awarded the Best Chef in the Northeast region in 2025.

== Early Life and Education ==
Kim grew up in South Korea. She recounts cooking at a young age with her grandparents to help prepare food for ceremonial rites, also known as jesa, for their ancestors. At first, Kim pursued being a food stylist. Kim would later recount that she started cooking classes a way to improve her food styling skills.

In 2014, Kim graduated from Johnson & Wales University.

Kim is married to Chris Pfail, who is also a chef. In 2025, Pfail was working at the restaurant Oberlin, which was a finalist for the 2025 James Beard Award for Outstanding Restaurant. Pfail graduated from Johnson & Wales University in 2013.

== Career ==
After she graduated from Johnson & Wales University, Kim worked as an intern and later an employee at the defunct Providence restaurant Birch. Kim met Ben Sukle during her time and Birch and helped him and his co-owener Bethany Caliaro open the restaurant Oberlin. She worked in variety of different restaurants in New York City and Portland, Oregon before returning to Rhode Island. In 2023, Kim returned to Providence to be a chef at Gift Horse, another one of Sukle and Caliaro's restaurants. That same year, Gift Horse was listed as one of “the best new restaurants in America” by Esquire.

While at Gift Horse, Kim was a named as a semifinalist for the 2024 James Beard Foundation's Emerging Chef Award. Later that year, Gift Horse and Kim appeared on The New York Times' "America's Best Restaurants" list.

In June 2025, Kim won the James Beard Award for the Best Chef in the Northeast region.

In October of 2025, Kim and her husband decided to move to South Korea for the birth of their daughter. Kim and Pfail stated that they decided to move to be closer to Kim's family and to utilize South Korea's parental support system, including postnatal care. Kim and Pfail also noted that the competitive housing market in the United States was another factor to their decision.
