= Chai Pani =

Restaurant in Asheville, North Carolina, U.S.

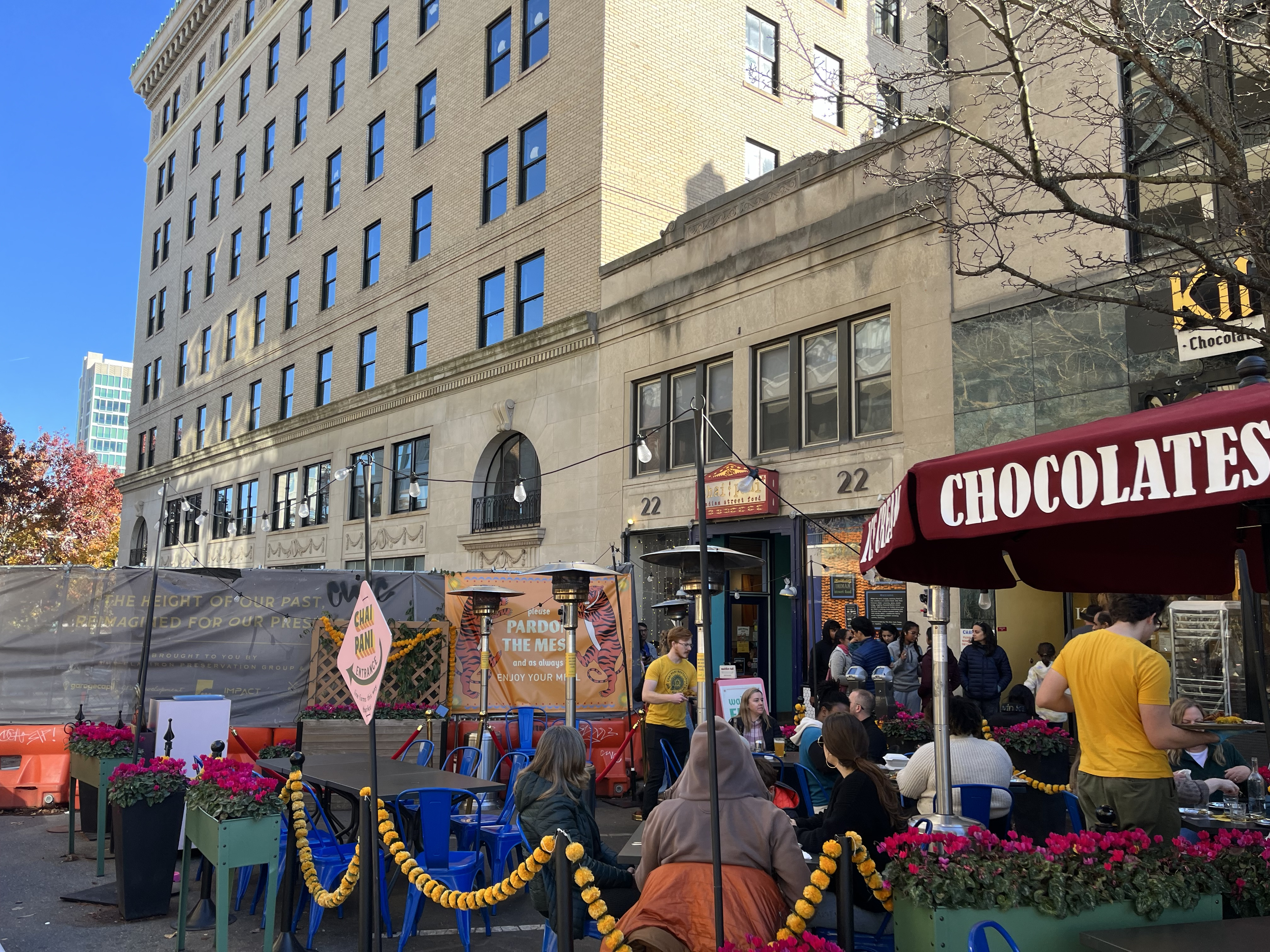
- Interactive map of Chai Pani

Restaurant information
- Established: 2009
- Owners: Meherwan and Molly Irani
- Head chef: Meherwan Irani
- Food type: Indian street food
- Location: 22 Battery Park Ave, Asheville, North Carolina, Buncombe, North Carolina, 28801, United States
- Coordinates: 35.5950°N 82.5554°W
- Website: www.chaipani.com

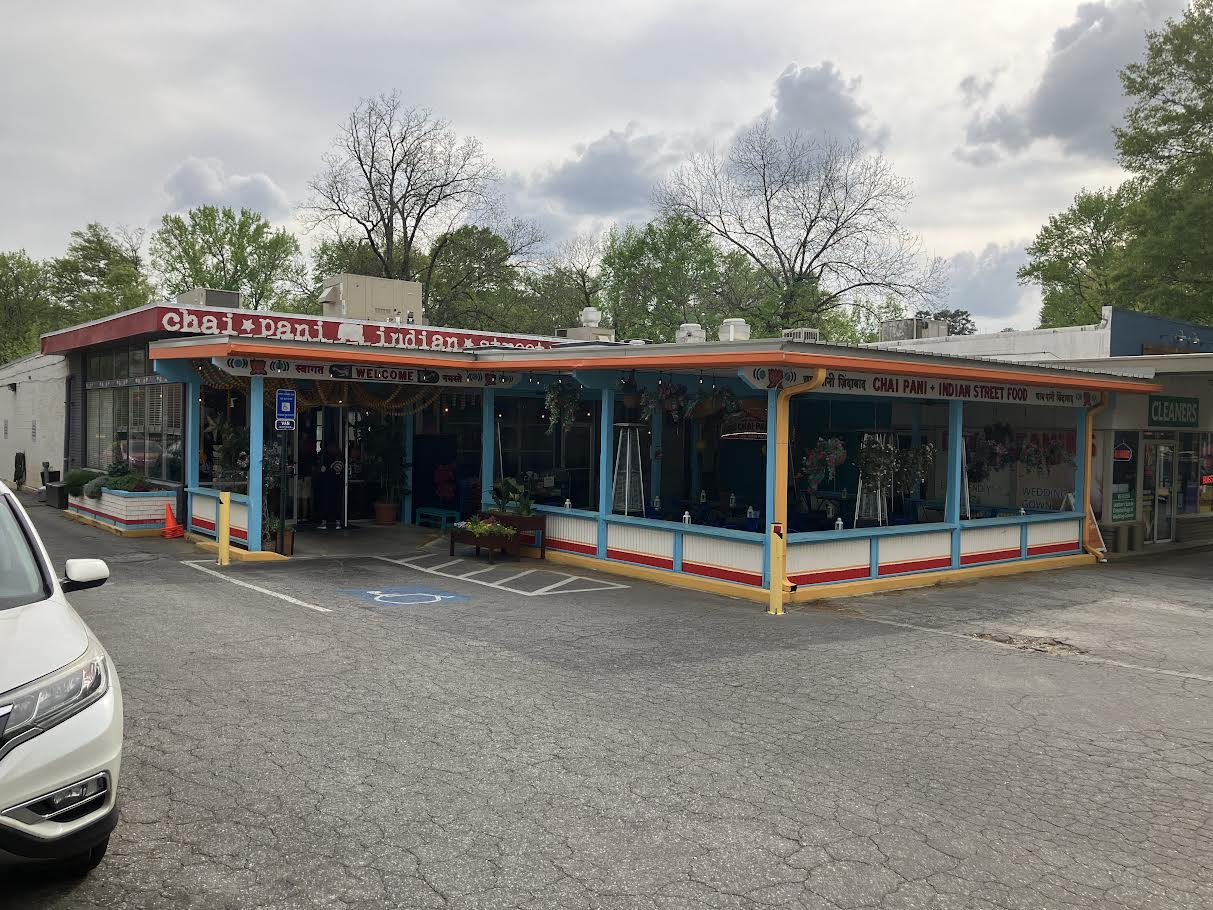
Front View of Decatur Location

Chai Pani is an Indian street food restaurant based in Asheville, North Carolina, and the 2022 winner of the James Beard Foundation Award for "Outstanding Restaurant".

== History ==
It was founded in 2009 by chef Meherwan Irani and his wife Molly. They opened a second location in Decatur, Georgia in March 2013, which first copied the original's menu but now focuses on the cuisine of India's Deccan Plateau, where Meherwan spent his childhood.

== See also ==
- List of Indian restaurants
