= Sherry Pocknett =

Indigenous chef

- Born: 1960 (age 65–66)
- Culinary career
- Current restaurant
- Sly Fox Den Too

Sherry Pocknett (born 1960) is a Mashpee Wampanoag chef and caterer. She was the owner of the Sly Fox Den Too restaurant in Charlestown, Rhode Island. In 2023, Pocknett received the James Beard Award for Best Chef in the Northeast. She is the first Indigenous woman to be honored by the James Beard Foundation. Sly Fox Den Too closed in January 2025.

== Life ==
Pocknett grew up on Cape Cod; she is the daughter of Native American rights advocate and Mashpee Wampanoag Chief Sly Fox, Vernon Pocknett. She grew up cooking with her family who from the early 1970s until 2000, operated and owned The Flume Restaurant in Mashpee on Cape Cod. Her uncle, Chief Flying Eagle, Earl Mills, Sr. was a chef, while her grandmother, Delscena Hendricks, served as master baker and chef. Prior to opening her restaurant, Pocknett worked as a caterer, handling many tribal social events, including the annual powwow, and worked as food and beverage director at the Mashantucket Pequot Museum and Research Center in Connecticut. Pocknett has two daughters, Jade and Cheyenne Pocknett-Galvin.

== Career ==
Pocknett opened Sly Fox Den Too in June 2021 in Charlestown, RI. The restaurant specialized in Eastern Woodland Indigenous cuisine and was named after Pocknett's father. The "too" in the name was added due to Pocknett planning to open a flagship location in Preston, Connecticut that will include a living Native American Museum and oyster farm. At Sly Fox Den Too, Pocknett utilized seasonal, indigenous, and foraged ingredients and Indigenous culinary practices.

In 2022, Sherry Pocknett received an Artist2Artist Fellowship grant from the Art Matters Foundation for Sly Fox Den.
