= Robynne Maii =

Hawaiian chef and restaurateur

Robynne Maii, along with her husband Chuck Bussler are the owners of Fête, which is a restaurant in Honolulu’s Chinatown. Maii is also the chef.

== Biography ==
Maii graduated from the Iolani School, then attended Middlebury College, where she studied English and modern dance. She returned to Hawaii to attend the culinary program at Kapiʻolani Community College, turning down a job offer in the process. She worked for a pastry chef after graduating but left to get a master’s degree at New York University. While in New York, she worked for two years at Gourmet (magazine) before moving on to develop a culinary program at one of the community colleges in Brooklyn in the City University of New York system. Maii returned to Hawaii and opened Fête in 2016.

== Awards and honors ==
She is the 2022 winner of the James Beard Award for Best Chef in the Northwest and Pacific. She is the first woman of Hawaiian ancestry to win and the first Hawaiian since 2003.

== Publications ==
- The New American Mosaic Cookbook for Students , 2013
