= Hamada Shaqoura =

Palestinian food blogger

- حمادة شقورة
- Occupations: Food blogger and internet personality
- Known for: Cooking for displaced children in the Gaza war
- Children: 2
- Awards: James Beard Award for Emerging Voice in Broadcast Media (2025), Time 100 Next (2024)

Instagram information
- Page: Hamada Sho
- Followers: 675 thousand (23 July 2026)

TikTok information
- Page: hamadashoo

Hamada Shaqoura (Arabic: حمادة شقورة), also known as Hamada Sho, is a Palestinian food blogger from Gaza City. He is known for posting social media videos of himself cooking and distributing meals for displaced children during the Gaza war. In his videos, he stares intensely at the camera without speaking or smiling. Shaqoura was recognized with the Time 100 Next list in 2024 and a James Beard Award for Emerging Voice in Broadcast Media in 2025. Business Insider created a short documentary about him, The Man Who Feeds Gaza's Children (2024), which won a News and Documentary Emmy. For several months in 2025, Shaqoura was unable to cook or distribute food due to the Israeli blockade of Gaza and ensuing famine. Time published his essay “I Can No Longer Feed Kids in Gaza”. By the end of the year, he had resumed cooking and posting to social media.

== Social media career ==
For several years before the Gaza war, Shaqoura promoted restaurants in Gaza through his social media marketing business. Shaqoura has praised Gazan restaurants for striving to create high quality food despite the 17 year blockade of Gaza.

=== Gaza war ===
During the Gaza war, Shaqoura was displaced from his home in northern Gaza to refugee camps in the south. His house and recording studio were destroyed. Food, gas, and potable water were very limited due to the intensification of the Israeli blockade and their attacks on sanitation infrastructure. After several months, he grew tired of his meals based on aid packages and resolved to cook more creatively.

In conjunction with aid organizations like Watermelon Relief, Shaqoura began cooking large batches of food for displaced children and posting videos of the process on social media. Based largely on canned food from aid packages, Shaqoura cooked dishes like chicken curry, pizza wraps, burgers, tacos, and caramel apples. He improvised meals with whatever ingredients he could find, like pizza crust from tortillas and mayonnaise from milk, cheese, and vinegar. Shaqoura is known for cooking while frowning at the camera without speaking in his videos. He says his facial expression represents how he and Palestinians feel about the conditions in Gaza, telling CBS News: "The situation does not call for smiling. What you see on screen will never show you how hard life is here." His videos include footage of Shaqoura distributing food to smiling children, who often respond by saying: "zaki", which means "delicious" in Palestinian Arabic. Shaqoura has stated that his motivation was to bring joy to children by recreating their favorite dishes and offering them some variety in their diet. He has also stated that he wanted to show Palestinian resilience through his videos.

Israel instituted a total blockade of Gaza in March 2025, making it more difficult for Shaqoura to access food and forcing Watermelon Relief to close its kitchen. Due to the ensuing Gaza Strip Famine and Israeli attacks on aid distribution sites, Shaqoura was unable to cook large batches of food and did not post cooking videos for several months. Children are especially vulnerable to the impacts of war. In 2024, an estimated 90% of children in Gaza were experiencing severe food insecurity. By July 2025, 16.5% of children under 5 in Gaza City were suffering from acute malnutrition.

Shaqoura stated that he typically ate bread twice a week. In July 2025, he stated that he was helping to deliver drinking water in hard to reach areas. In his Time essay, "I Can No Longer Feed Kids in Gaza", and his The Drift essay, "The Silence in My Kitchen", Shaqoura wrote about the starvation in Gaza and encountering children on the street who asked him when he would cook again.

By October 2025, access to food had improved in Gaza and he resumed cooking and posting videos.

=== Recognition ===
Shaqoura's videos have millions of views and some have gone viral. As of July 2024, he had 111,000 TikTok followers; by June 2025 he had more than 600,000 followers on Instagram. He was featured on the 2024 Time 100 Next list and won a 2025 James Beard Award for Emerging Voice in Broadcast Media. Shaqoura's acceptance speech was pre-recorded in front of a destroyed house. The Man Who Feeds Gaza's Children (2024), a video about Shaqoura created by Business Insider, won a News & Documentary Emmy Award and a Webby Award. In 2026, Business Insider announced Dear Nizar, Dear Maryam, a full-length documentary narrated by Shaqoura.

== Personal life ==
Born around 1992, Shaqoura is from Gaza City. He was married shortly before the Gaza war. His son and daughter were born during the war.
