= Masako Morishita =

Japanese American chef

Masako Morishita is a Japanese executive chef based in Washington, D.C.. She was named as the James Beard Foundation's 2024 Emerging Chef.

== Early life ==
Morishita was born in Kobe, Japan. Her family has worked in the restaurant business for a century. Her family's restaurant, Morishita Liquor and Bar, is run by her mother and father. Morishita's grandmother previously ran and was a cook at Morishita Liquor and Bar.

In 2013, she traveled to the United States as an exchange student in Poplar, Wisconsin.

== Career ==
Morishita was a member of the Washington Redskins cheerleading squad from 2013 to 2018. She was the team's first non-American born captain.

In 2019, Morishita filed a lawsuit against her then ex-boyfriend chef Andrew Chiou and the business Momo Yakitori, which is an LLC legally under Chiou's name, for $66,000. Morishita's attorney stated Morishita was entitled to damages regarding the salary she was allegedly owed; however, Chiou claims that Morishita was never actually an employee at the restaurant. Also in 2019, Morishita opened her first solo pop-up, Otabe. In 2021, Maxwell Park, a Washington, D.C. wine bar, commissioned Morishita for several dishes for tastings and eventually hired her as executive chef. She worked at Maxwell Park until 2022.

After leaving Maxwell Park in 2022, she started working as executive chef at Perry's, a forty-year old sushi restaurant located in the Adams Morgan neighborhood. At Perry's, she started a new Japanese breakfast service. She is also the first Japanese woman to hold the executive chef position in Perry's history.

In 2023, Morishita was named at "Chef of the Year" by D.C. Eater.

In 2024, she was named as the James Beard Foundation's Emerging Chef. She was also nominated as a finalist by the Restaurant Association Metropolitan Washington (RAMW) in its "Rising Culinary Star of the Year" category.

She is also a member of the United States Department of State's American Culinary Corps. As a culinary ambassador, she was chosen by Vice President Kamala Harris and Secretary of State Antony J. Blinken to serve as a guest chef for the State Luncheon hosted during the State Visit of Prime Minister of Japan Fumio Kishida in April 2024.
