= Penelope Wong (chef) =

Asian American Chef

- Education: University of Northern Colorado
- Occupation: Cook
- Awards: James Beard Foundation Award (Best Chef: Mountain (CO, ID, MT, UT, WY), 2026)

Penelope Wong (born circa 1976) is a chef and James Beard Award winner. She was nominated for a James Beard Award four times and is the first Asian American woman from Colorado to win the James Beard Award for Best Chef in the mountain region.

== Career ==
From 1998 to 2018, Wong worked as a waiter and later their first and youngest female head chef at the Glenmore Country Club located in Englewood, Colorado

In late 2019, Wong opened her own food truck called "Yuan Wonton." Wong ran her food truck throughout the COVID-19 pandemic. During the pandemic, Wong and her husband ran a donation-based program called "Doctor’s Orders initiative" that delivered their food to hospital workers. In 2021, Wong was a part of a fundraising campaigned called "Better Together," which was organized after the 2021 Atlanta Spa Shootings and raised $10,000 for the AAPI Community Fund and The Asian American Foundation.

In 2023, Wong opened Yuan Wonton's brick and mortar store in Denver's Park Hill neighborhood. That same year, Westworld named Wong as a person to watch. Wong was a named as a semifinalist for the for the 2023 James Beard Award for Best Chef: Mountain, which covers the region of Colorado, Idaho, Montana, Utah, and Wyoming.

In 2024, Wong's Yuan Wonton was named one of the best restaurants in America by The New York Times. That same year, Wong was a finalist for the James Beard Award for Best Chef: Mountain.

In 2025, Wong was again a finalist for the James Beard Award for Best Chef: Mountain. In 2026, Wong won the James Beard Award for Best Chef: Mountain. She became the first Asian woman from Colorado to win the award. Wong won the award over fellow Coloradan chef Johnny Curiel, whose restaurant Alma Fonda Fina already won a Michelin star. Also in 2026, Wong was chosen by United and Chef's Table as one of then chefs to create new and exclusive inflight meals for United's international business class menu.

== Personal Life and Education ==
Wong was born circa 1976. Wong is a first-generation Asian American. Her parents were both from Thailand and her grandparents have Chinese heritage. Her parents owned a restaurant called "Chinatown Restaurant," which was located in North Denver and was open for almost 25 years. Wong married to Rob Jenks in 2011. Wong has a daughter and son.

Wong graduated from the University of Northern Colorado and earned a degree in psychology.
