= Susan Bae =

Pastry Chef

- Occupation: Pastry chef
- Awards: James Beard Foundation Award (2026)

Susan Bae is a Korean American pastry chef. Bae won the James Beard Award in 2026 for Outstanding Pastry Chef or Baker. She was nominated for the same award in 2024 and 2025.

In 2010, Bae graduated from Le Cordon Bleu Institute located in Pasadena, California.

In 2015, she worked as the opening pastry chef for Kevin Meehan's seasonal restaurant Kali, located in Los Angeles, California. Kali would later become a One Star MICHELIN restaurant while Bae was there. Bae's meringue gelato at Kali was also written about in Dining LA magazine's Spring 2018 issue. She would later work at other Los Angeles restaurant such as Providence and Spago. After Los Angeles, Bae moved to Texas and worked at The Fairmont Hotel in Austin.

In 2020, Bae became the co-owner and head pastry chef of the Vietnamese restaurant, Moon Rabbit, located in Washington D.C. Kevin Tien is the restaurant's head chef and co-owner. Bae stated that Tien had actually reached out to her through instagram to start the restaurant. Moon Rabbit was originally located at The Wharf but later moved to Penn Quarter in 2024.

In 2025, Bae was a finalist for the RAMMY award for Pastry Chef or Baker of the Year by the Restaurant Association Metropolitan Washington. That same year, the World's 50 Best Restaurants named Bae the winner of the North America's Best Pastry Chef Award 2025, which was sponsored by Valrhona.

In 2024 and 2025, Bae was named as a James Beard Award finalists for Outstanding Pastry Chef or Baker. On January 21, 2026, she was named as a semifinalist again for the James Beard Award for Outstanding Pastry Chef or Baker. On June 15, 2026, Bae won the James Beard Award for Outstanding Pastry Chef or Baker. She was also the only chef from the Washington D.C. area to win the award in 2026.
