= Punch (website) =

Media website covering drinking culture

- Founded: 2013
- Country of origin: US
- Owners: Random House LLC (2013); Penguin Random House LLC (2013–2021); Vox Media Inc. (2021–2026); PMX Global, LLC (since 2026)
- Founders: Talia Baiocchi; Aaron Wehner
- Editors: Talia Baiocchi (editor-in-chief) Chloe Frechette (deputy editor) Jess Mayhugh (managing editor)
- Website: https://www.punchdrink.com

Punch is an online media website covering drinks, drinking culture, and nightlife. The website was founded by Talia Baiocchi and Aaron Wehner in 2013. The site has been recognized six times by the James Beard Foundation Awards.

Vox Media acquired Punch in 2021 as a companion site to Eater. In 2026, Penske Media Corporation, the largest shareholder of Vox Media, agreed to acquire a number of the company's brands, consolidating its existing publishing portfolio into a new subsidiary, PMX, comprising over 25 titles, thereby strengthening its position as the largest digital media publisher.

== History ==
The drinks and nightlife site Punch is a brand of the digital media company Vox Media. It covers drinking culture and home bartending, offering feature stories and guides alongside a cocktail recipe database with over 2,500 recipes. The property earns revenue via advertising, sometimes displaying content generated by Vox Creative.

Punch was founded in 2013 by current editor-in-chief Talia Baiocchi and Aaron Wehner, with Baiocchi serving as the site’s editor-in-chief. The site was initially focused around wine, spirits, cocktails, and nightlife. In August 2021, Punch was acquired by Vox Media as a companion brand to Eater, expanding coverage to include social videos. In 2023, Punch launched Pre Shift, a newsletter for the hospitality industry, in collaboration with Eater.

== Organization ==
In 2013, Leslie Pariseau joined Punch as the site's founding deputy editor, and later, features editor. In 2023, Jess Mayhugh joined as Punch’s managing editor; and in November 2024, Chloe Frechette was named executive editor. Talia Baiocchi was named the GM of Punch as well as Eater, Thrillist, and PS — Vox Media’s lifestyle editorial brands — in November 2024.

== Reception ==
Punch has been described by The Wall Street Journal as "a hip online magazine devoted to wine and cocktails."

The brand's content has been nominated for six and won three James Beard Foundation Awards.
