= Berlu =

Vietnamese restaurant in Portland, Oregon, U.S.

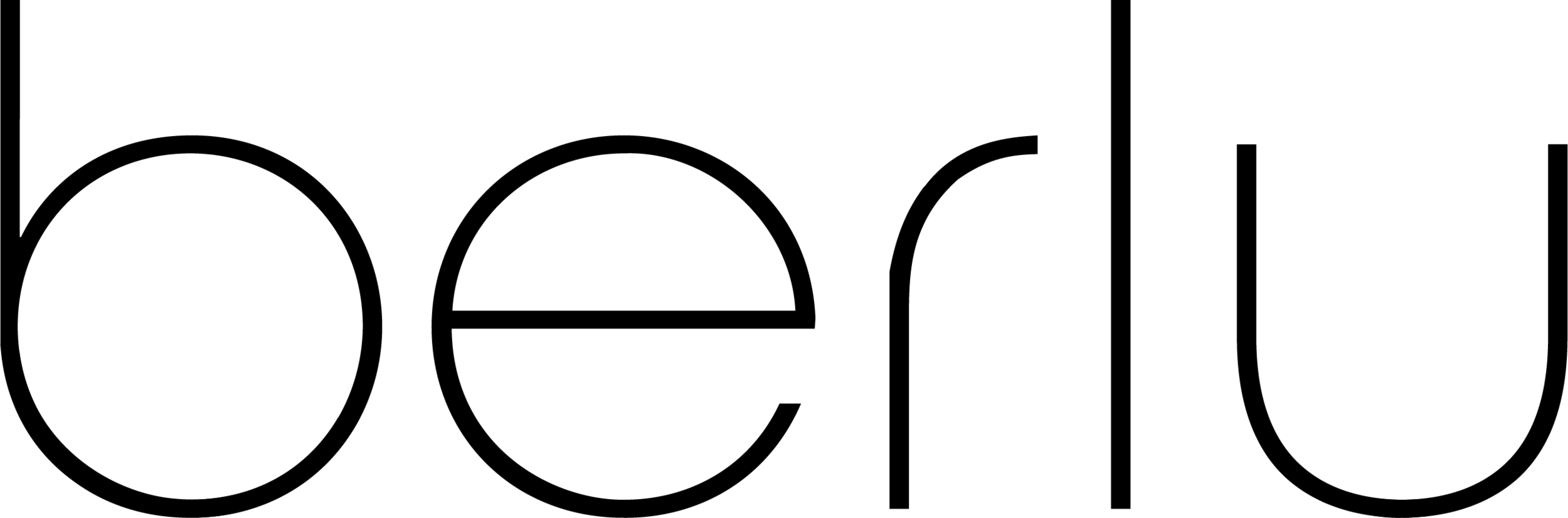

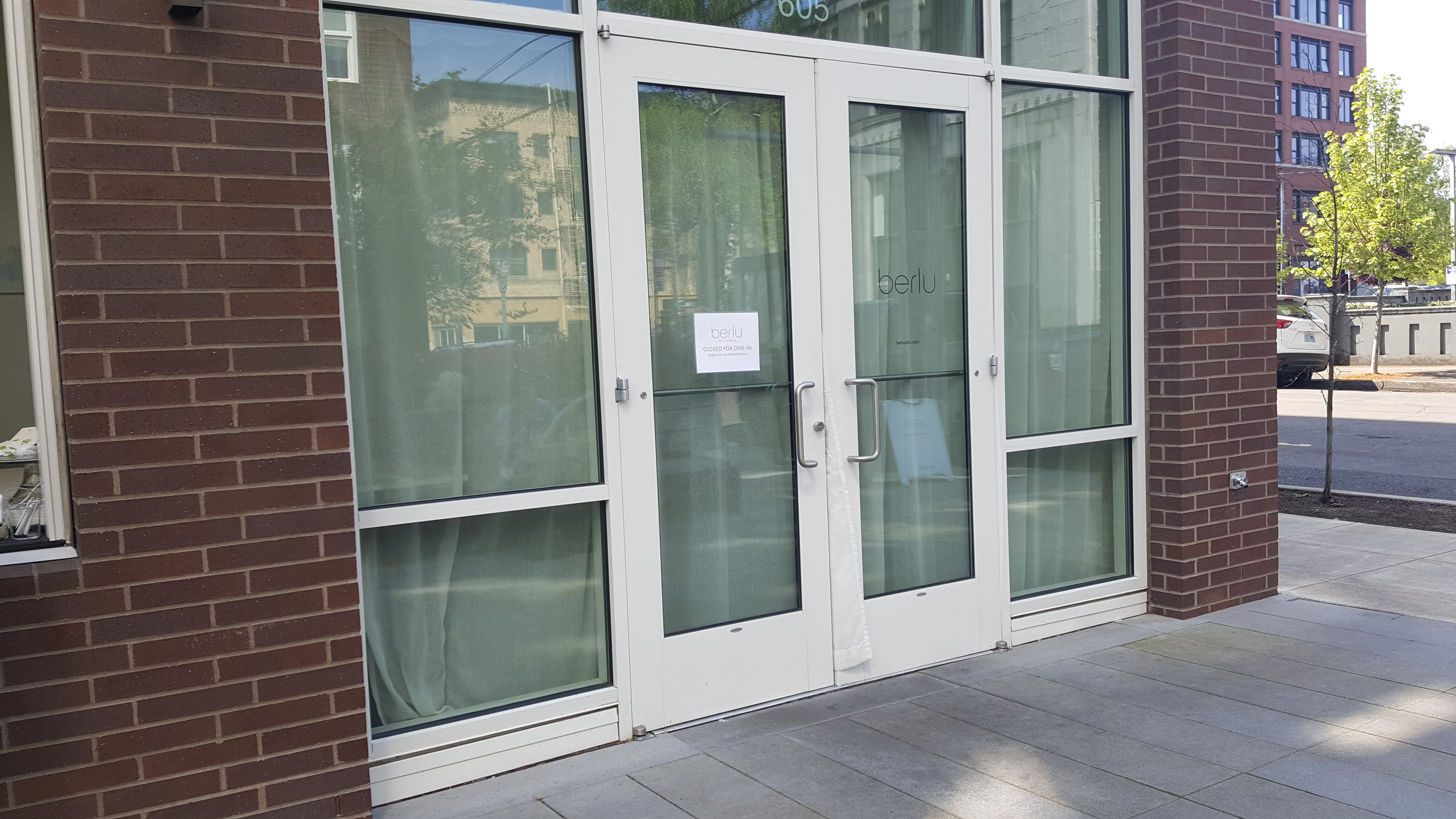
- The restaurant's exterior in 2022
- Interactive map of Berlu

Restaurant information
- Established: June 2019
- Owner: Vincent Nguyen
- Food type: Vietnamese
- Location: 605 Southeast Belmont Street, Portland, Oregon, 97214, United States
- Coordinates: 45.5168°N 122.6596°W
- Website: berlupdx.com

Berlu Bakery, or simply Berlu, is a Vietnamese restaurant and bakery in Portland, Oregon, United States. The restaurant opened in 2019.

== Description ==
Berlu is a Vietnamese restaurant in southeast Portland's Buckman neighborhood.

== History ==
The restaurant opened in June 2019. Jorge Rico has been the sous chef. Berlu hosted an ice cream pop-up in the space in 2022, as well as a pop-up at The Hideout Chai Bar in New York City in 2023. Later in the year, chef Vincent Nguyen announced plans to end the restaurant's tasting menu, opting to transition from a fine dining establishment into Berlu Bakery, effective January 2024.

Berlu Bakery closed temporarily in October 2024, intending to reopen at a larger location in 2025. To commemorate Lunar New Year, the bakery operated as a pop-up at Best Friend's on February 2.

== Reception ==
The restaurant earned Nguyen a James Beard Foundation Award nomination in the category Best Chef: Northwest and Pacific in 2022. He won in the same category in 2023. Waz Wu included Berlu in Eater Portland's 2023 list of "Portland’s Primo Special Occasion Restaurants for Vegans and Vegetarians". Michelle Lopez and Janey Wong included Berlu Bakery in the website's 2025 overview of the Portland's best bakeries. Michael Russell included the Bún Berlu in The Oregonian's list of Portland's 25 best dishes of 2025. Writers for Portland Monthly included the bánh bò nướng in a 2025 list of the city's "most iconic" dishes.

== See also ==
- List of bakeries
- List of Vietnamese restaurants
