= List of bakeries =

A list of bakery chain brands

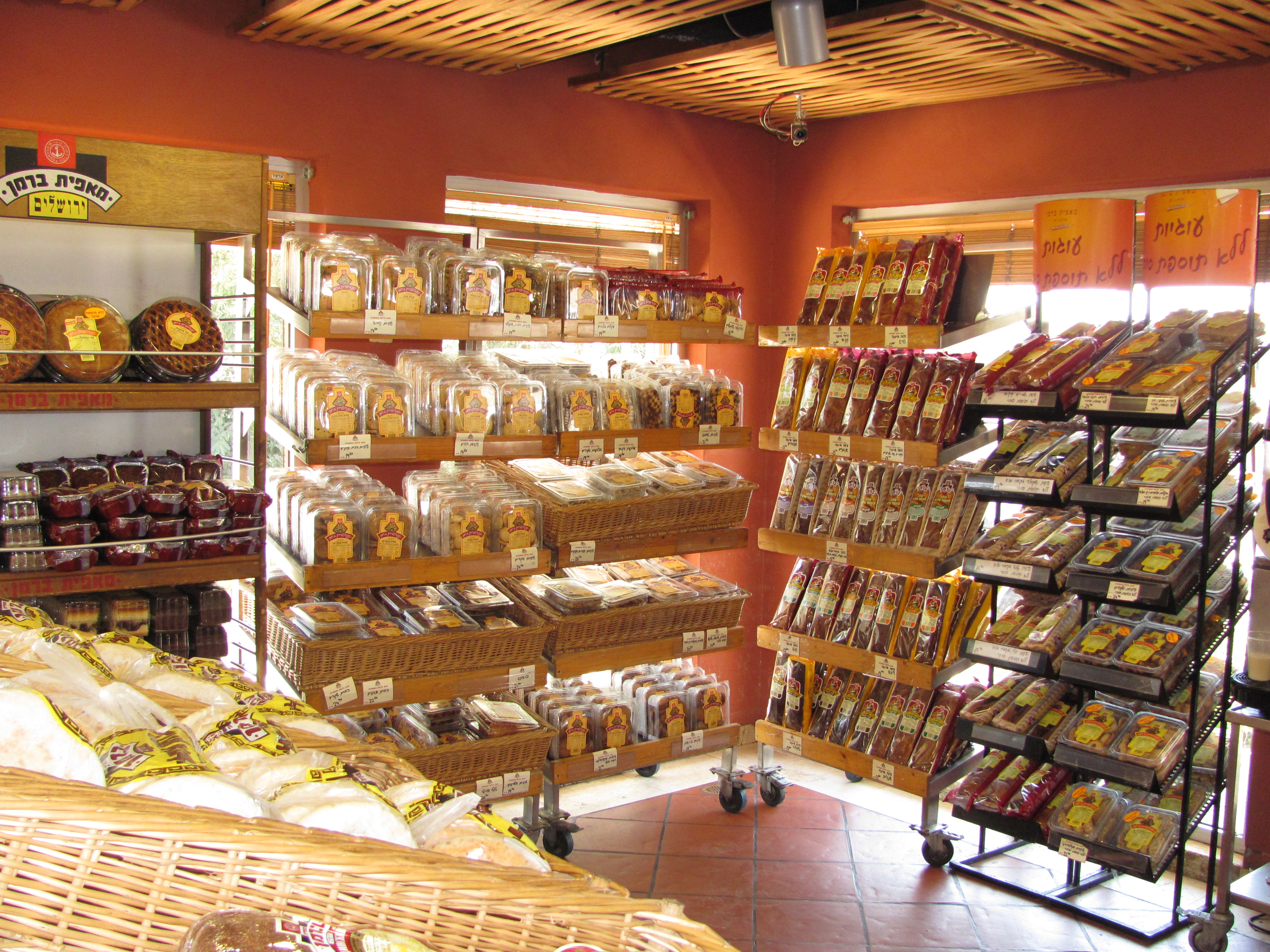
Breads, cakes and patisserie for sale at the Berman's Bakery retail bread shop in Givat Shaul, Jerusalem

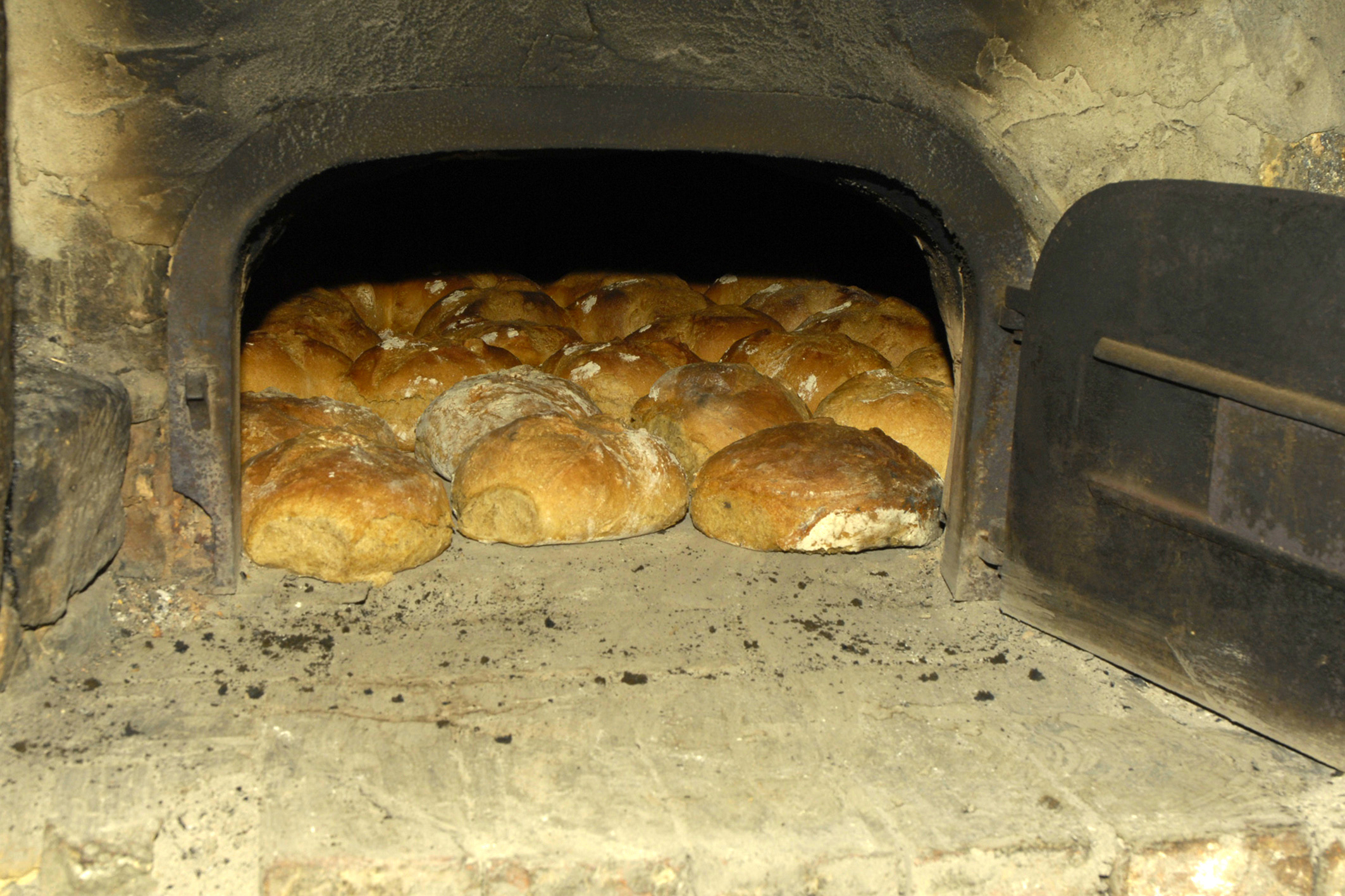
Bread baking in a traditional oven

This is a list of notable bakeries. A bakery is an establishment that produces and sells flour-based food baked in an oven such as bread, cakes, pastries, and pies. Some retail bakeries are also cafés, serving coffee and tea to customers who wish to consume the baked goods on the premises.

== Worldwide ==
- Le Pain Quotidien – global chain of bakery-cafés operating in many countries around the world. It sells organic bread and cakes in a homey, rustic style.
- Muffin Break – independent company which operates small coffee shops throughout the UK, Australia and New Zealand and India
- Wonder Bread – name of a brand of bread. It is sold in North American stores and produced by three distinct companies: in Canada by Weston Bakeries Limited, a subsidiary of George Weston Limited, in the United States by Flowers Foods, in Mexico by Grupo Bimbo and in Pakistan.

== By country ==
=== Australia ===
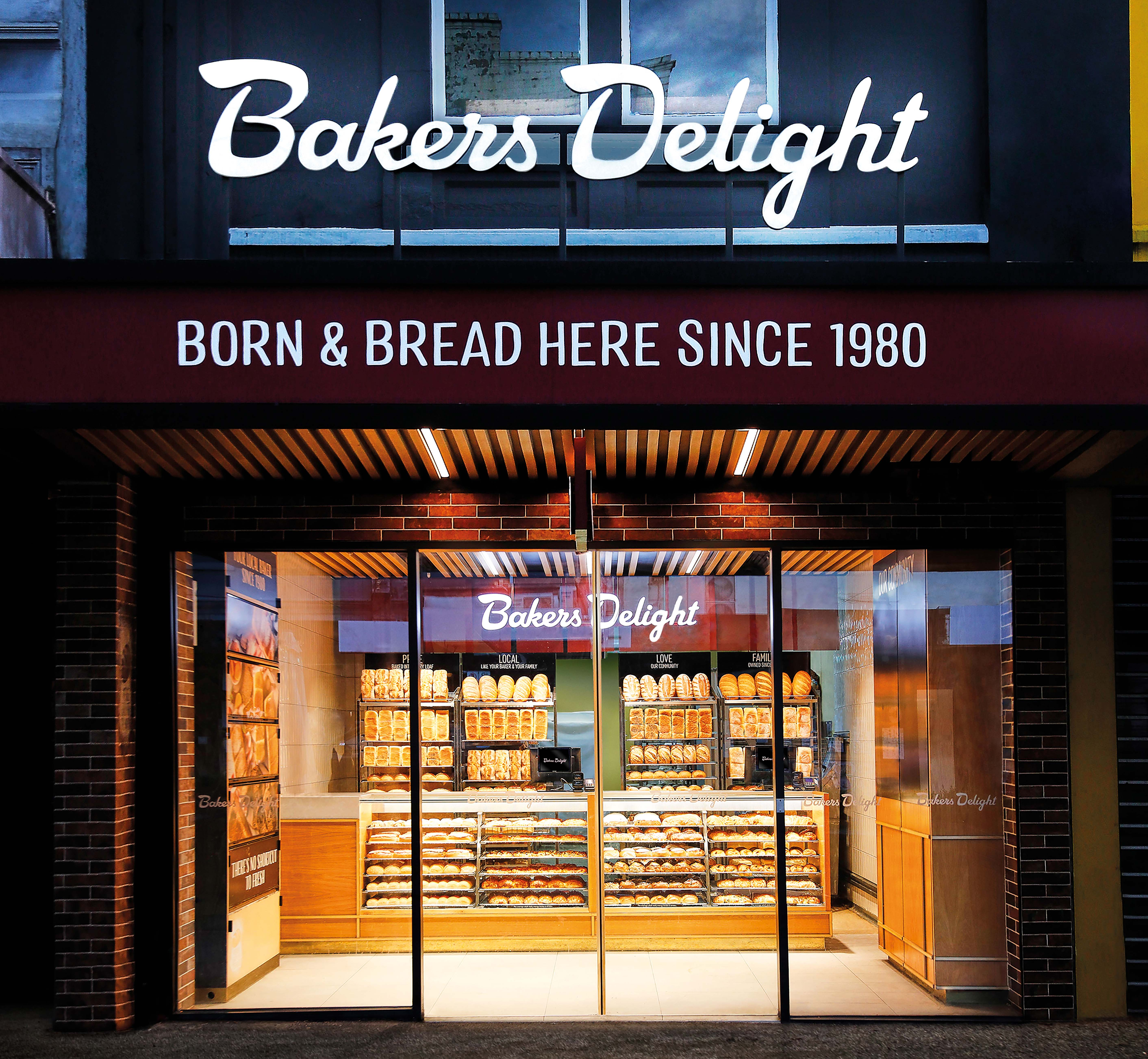
Bakers Delight

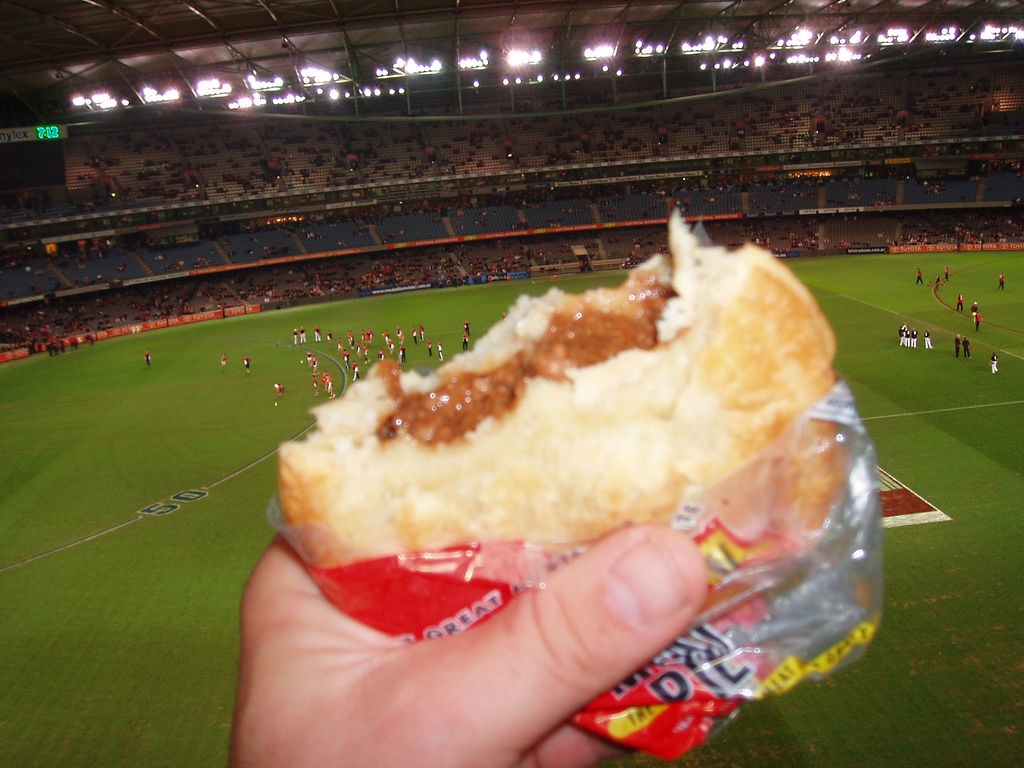
A Pattie's Foods' Four'N Twenty meat pie

- Bakers Delight
- Banjo's Bakery Cafe
- Balfours
- Breadtop
- Brooklyn Boy Bagels
- Brumby's Bakeries
- Goodman Fielder
- Michel's Patisserie
- Mrs Mac's Pies
- Patties Foods (previously Patties Bakery)
- Pie Face
- Quality Bakers
- Tip Top Bakeries

=== Bangladesh ===
- Cooper's
- Prince of Wales bakery
- Tasty Treat

=== Canada ===
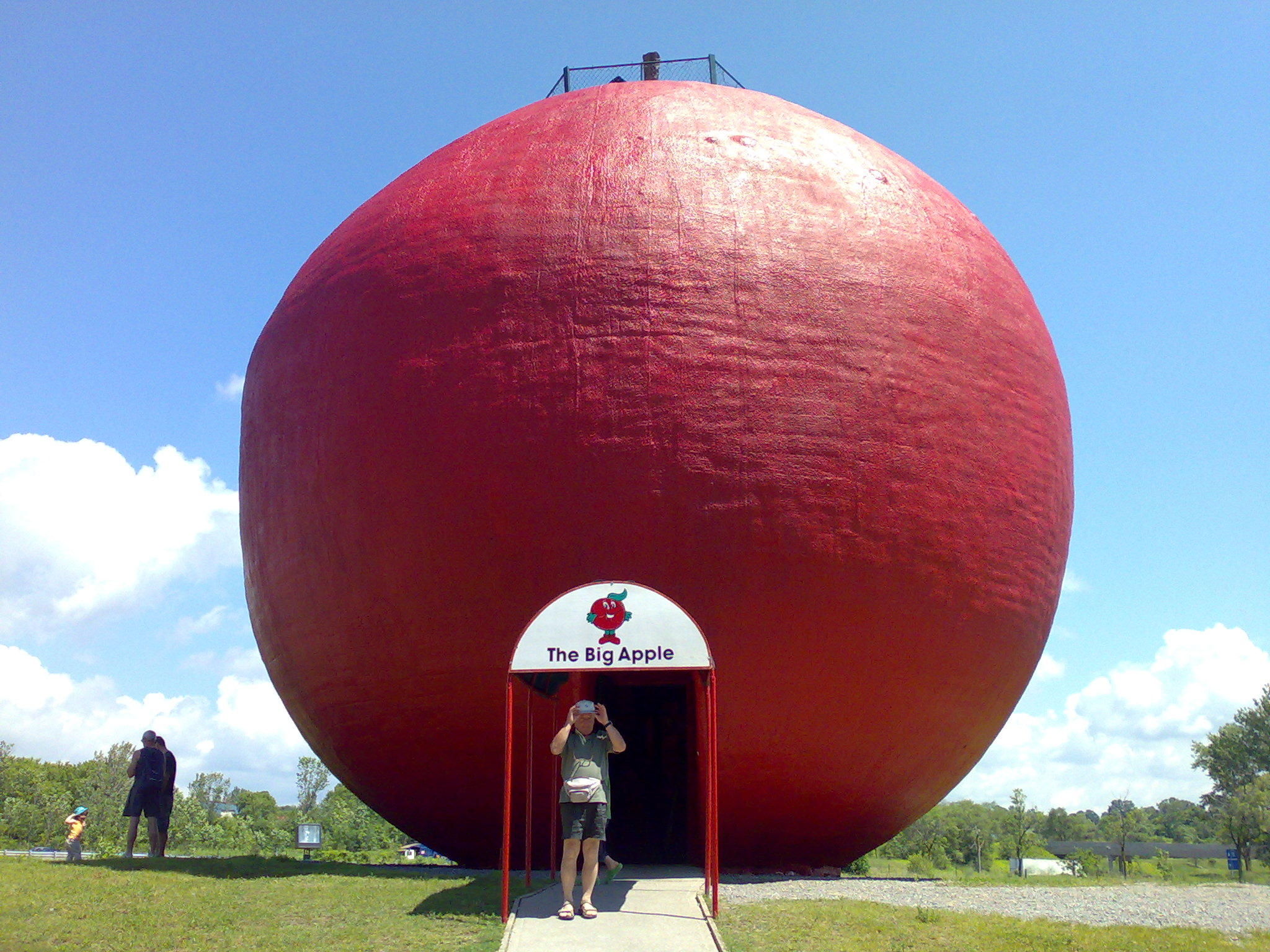
The big apple roadside attraction at Big Apple in Colborne, Ontario

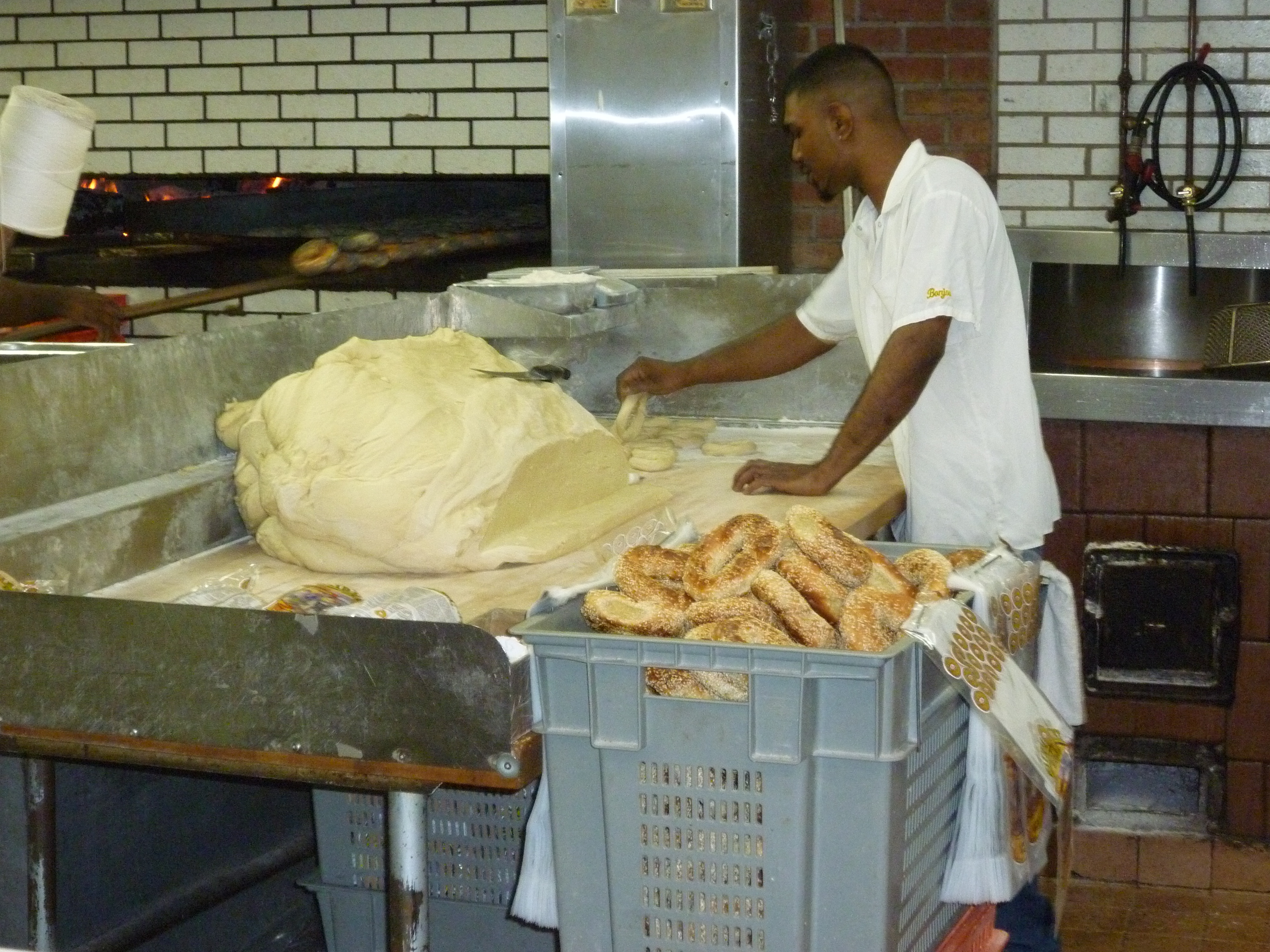
A huge mass of bagel dough ready to be rolled and prepared at Fairmount Bagel in Montreal, Quebec, Canada

- ACE Bakery
- Big Apple
- Canada Bread
- COBS Bread
- Country Style
- Fairmount Bagel
- George Weston Limited
- Michel's Bakery Café
- Multi-Marques
- Première Moisson
- St-Viateur Bagel
- Vachon Inc.

=== Chile ===
- Castaño

=== China ===
==== Hong Kong ====
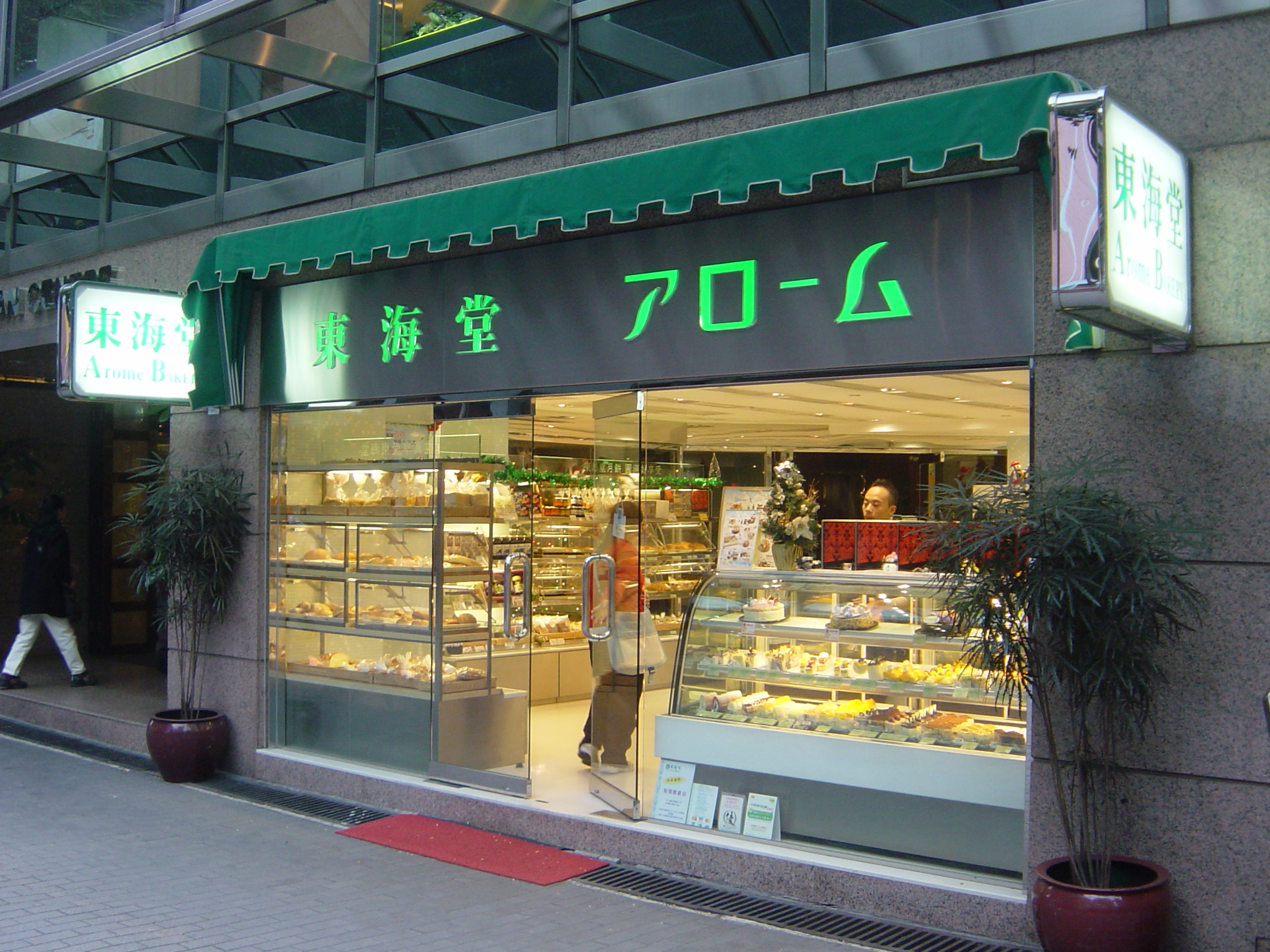
An Arome Bakery store in Tsim Sha Tsui, Kowloon, Hong Kong

- Arome Bakery
- Kee Wah Bakery
- La Rose Noire
- Maxim's Catering
- Saint Honore Cake Shop

=== Colombia ===
- Grupo Nutresa

=== France ===
- Biscuits Fossier
- Délifrance
- Groupe Holder
- Maison Kayser
- Paul

=== Germany ===
- Coppenrath & Wiese
- Bahlsen

=== India ===
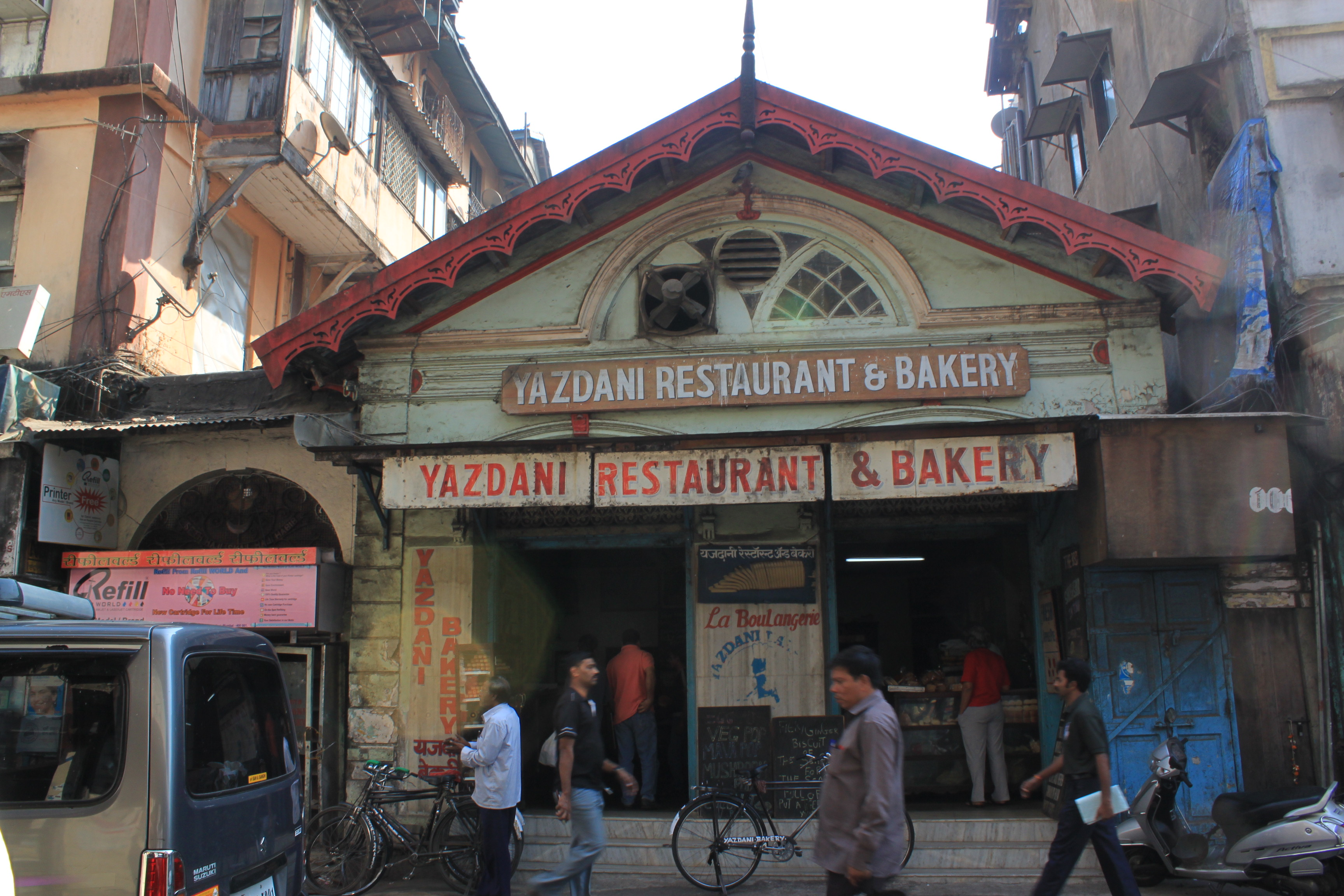
Yazdani Bakery in Mumbai, India

- Ghantewala
- Karachi Bakery
- Mangharam Biscuit
- Monginis
- Nahoum & Sons
- Parle Products
- Yazdani Bakery

=== Indonesia ===
- Holland Bakery
- Kino Food
- Mayora Indah
- Roti Bunz

=== Ireland ===
- Pat the Baker

=== Israel ===
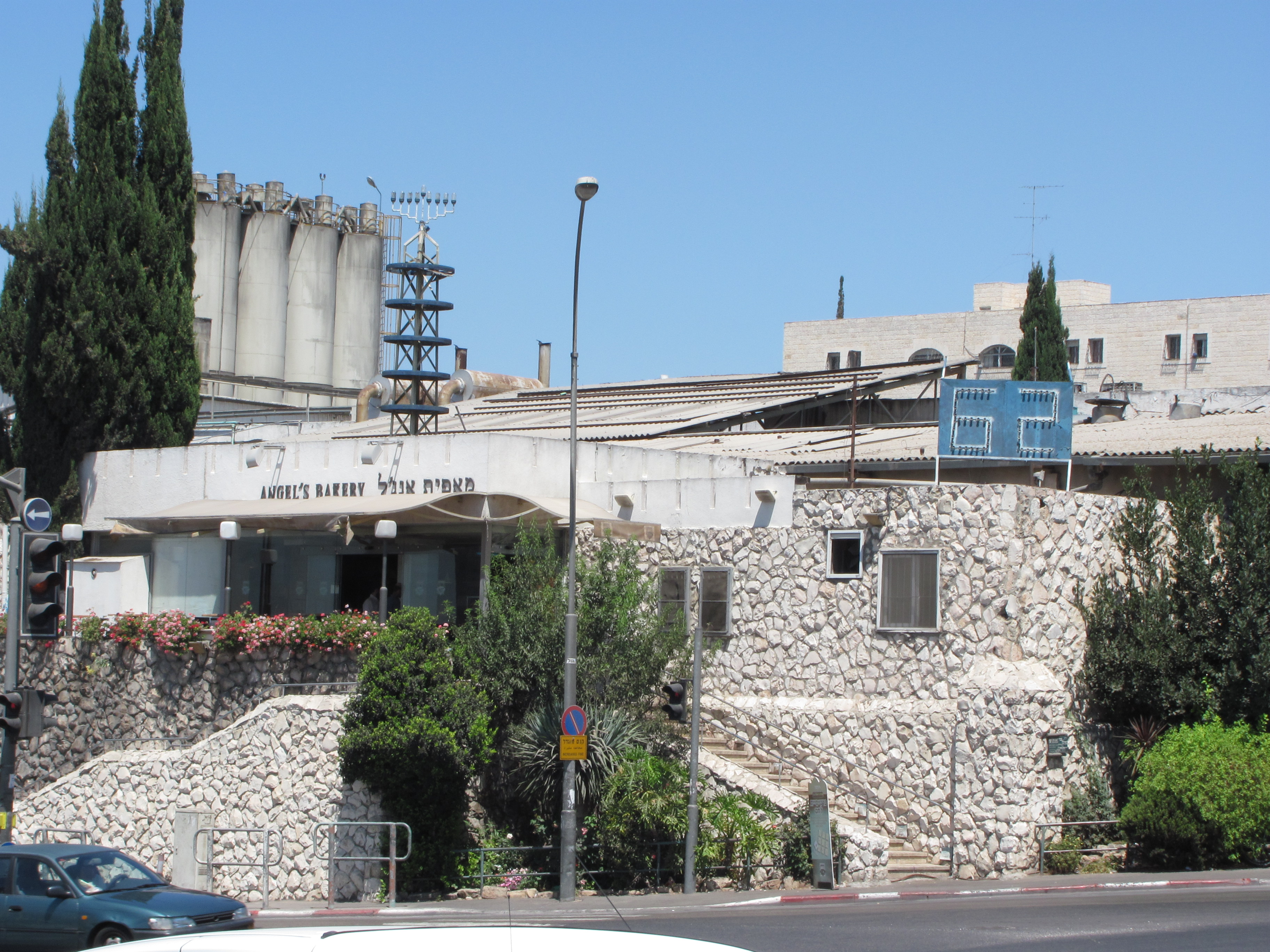
The landmark Angel Bakeries factory store in Givat Shaul, Jerusalem, Israel. The light board with the number "62" indicates 62 years since the establishment of the State of Israel.

- Angel Bakeries
- Berman's Bakery
- Holy Bagel
- Roladin
- Saidels Bakery

=== Italy ===
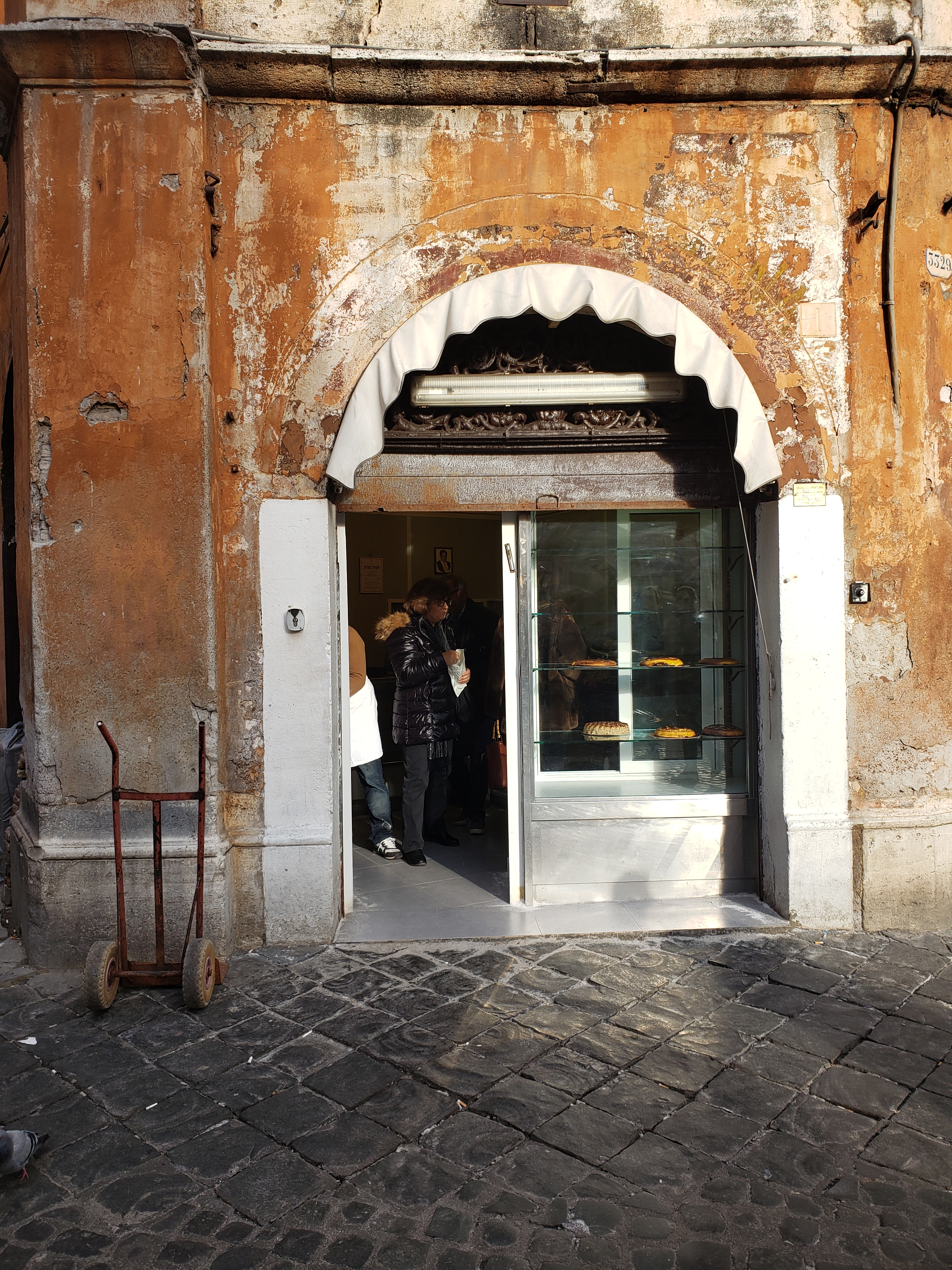
Pasticceria Boccione in Rome

- Bauli
- Pasticceria Boccione

=== Japan ===
- DONQ
- Italian Tomato
- Kimuraya Sohonten (ja:木村屋總本店)
- Takaki Bakery
- Yamazaki Baking

=== Malaysia ===
- The Italian Baker
- Rotiboy
- Secret Recipe

=== Mexico ===
- Grupo Bimbo

=== Nepal ===
- Krishna Pauroti

=== New Zealand ===
- Jimmy's Pies

=== Philippines ===
- Goldilocks Bakeshop
- Max's Corner Bakery
- Monde Nissin
- Pan de Manila
- Red Ribbon
- Republic Biscuit Corporation
- San Miguel Food and Beverage
- Universal Robina

=== Singapore ===
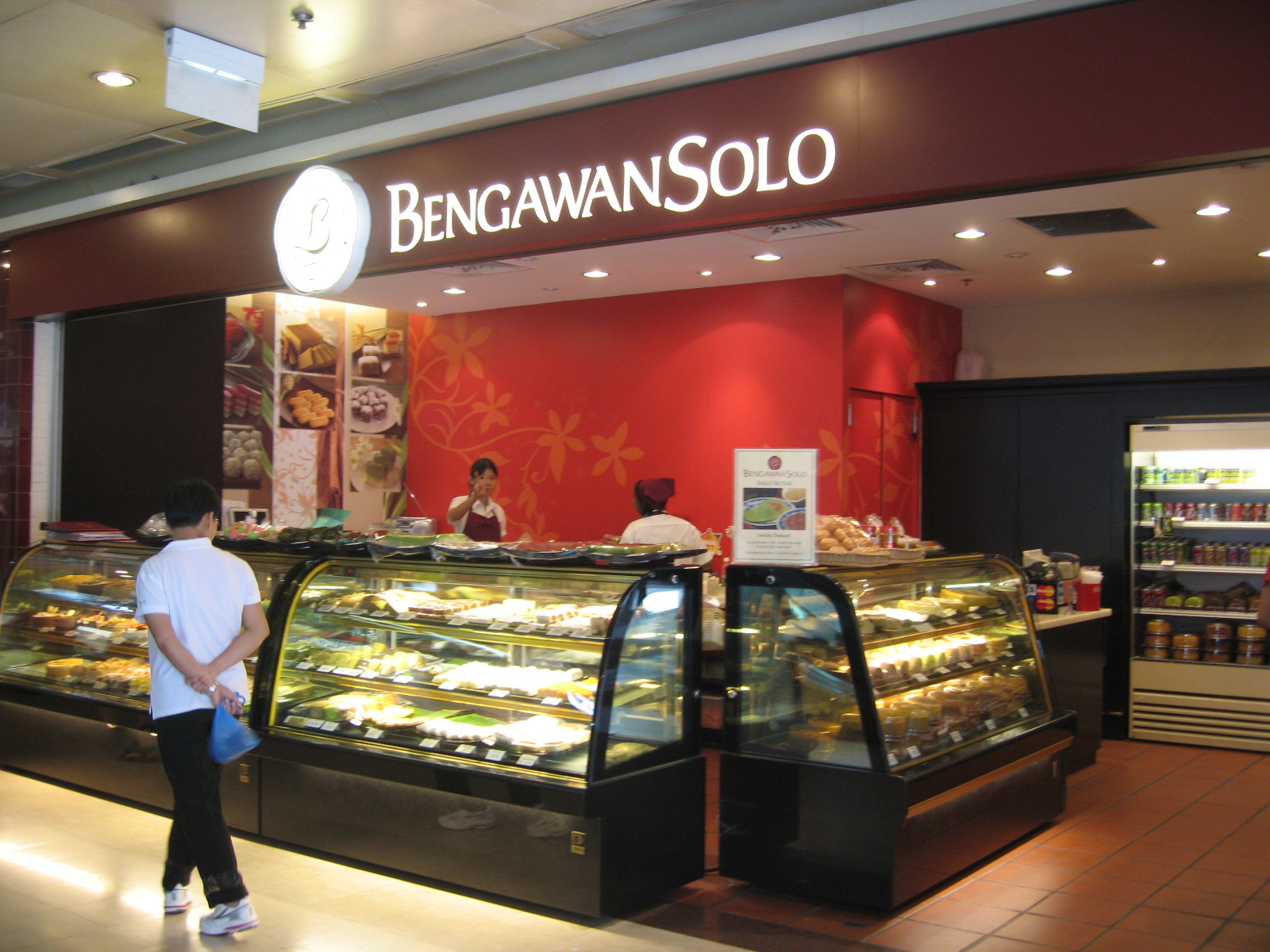
A Bengawan Solo store

- Bengawan Solo
- BreadTalk
- Gardenia Foods

=== South Korea ===
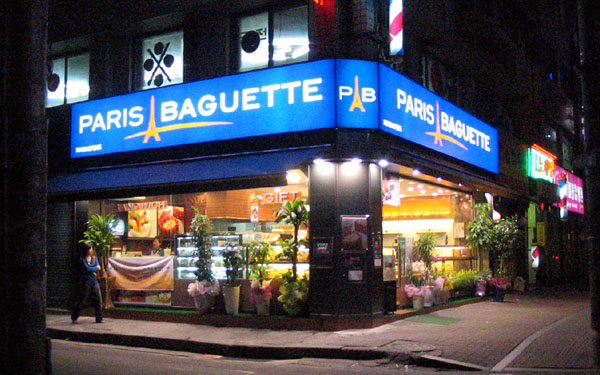
A Paris Baguette in Yeongdeungpo-gu, Seoul, South Korea

- Paris Baguette
- Sungsimdang
- Tous Les Jours

=== Switzerland ===
- Aryzta

=== Taiwan ===
- 85°C Bakery Cafe
- Sunmerry Bakery
- Wu Pao Chun Bakery

=== Ukraine ===
- Yarych Confectionery
- Lviv Croissants

=== United Kingdom ===
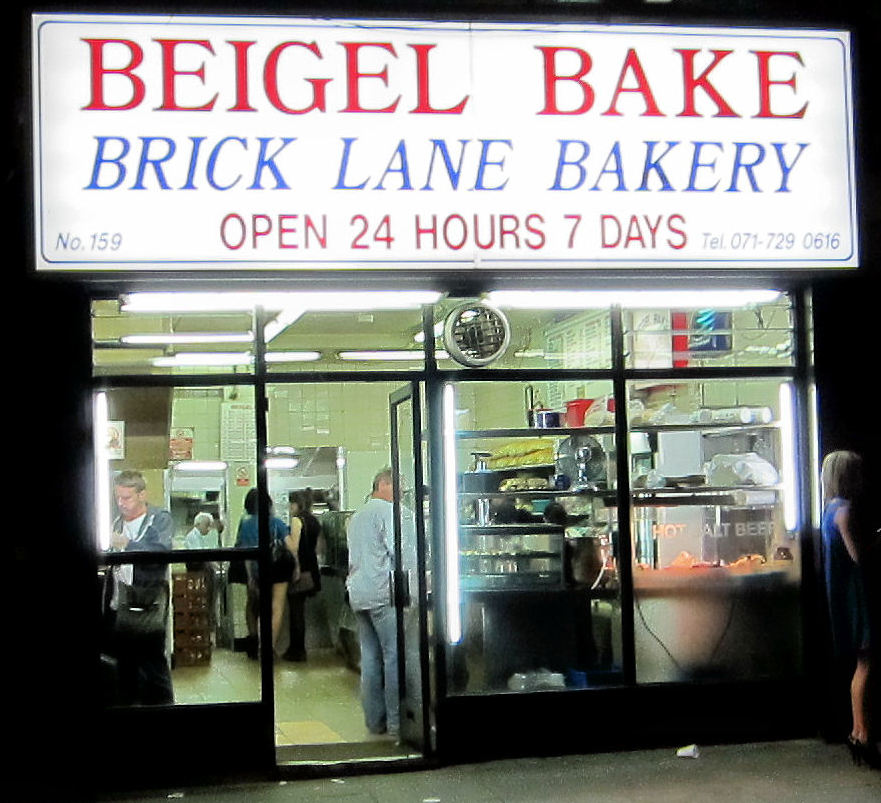
The front of Beigel Bake

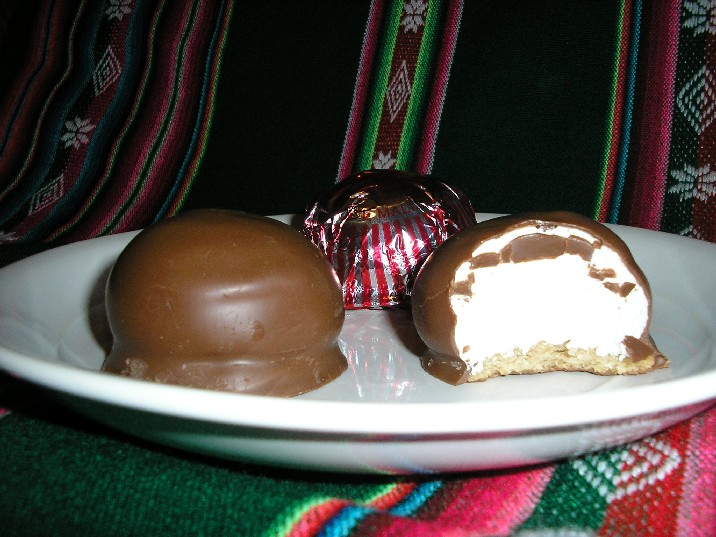
Two-and-a-half Tunnock's Tea Cakes

- AB Mauri
- Beigel Bake
- Brace's Bakery
- Bread Ahead
- Burton's Biscuit Company
- Cooks the Bakery
- Cooplands
- Druckers Vienna Patisserie
- Fox's Biscuits
- Galloways Bakers
- Ginsters
- Greggs
- Grodzinski Bakery
- Holland's Pies
- Hovis
- HR Bradfords
- Huntley & Palmers
- Irwin's Bakery
- Jus-Rol
- Krispy Kreme UK
- Lisboa Patisserie
- Millie's Cookies
- Mr Kipling
- New York Bagel
- Peek Freans
- Pork Farms
- Poundbakery
- Premier Foods
- Ryvita Company
- Sayers
- Tunnock's
- United Biscuits
- Walkers Shortbread
- Warburtons
- Warrens Bakery
- William Jackson Food Group
- Wrights Pies

=== United States ===
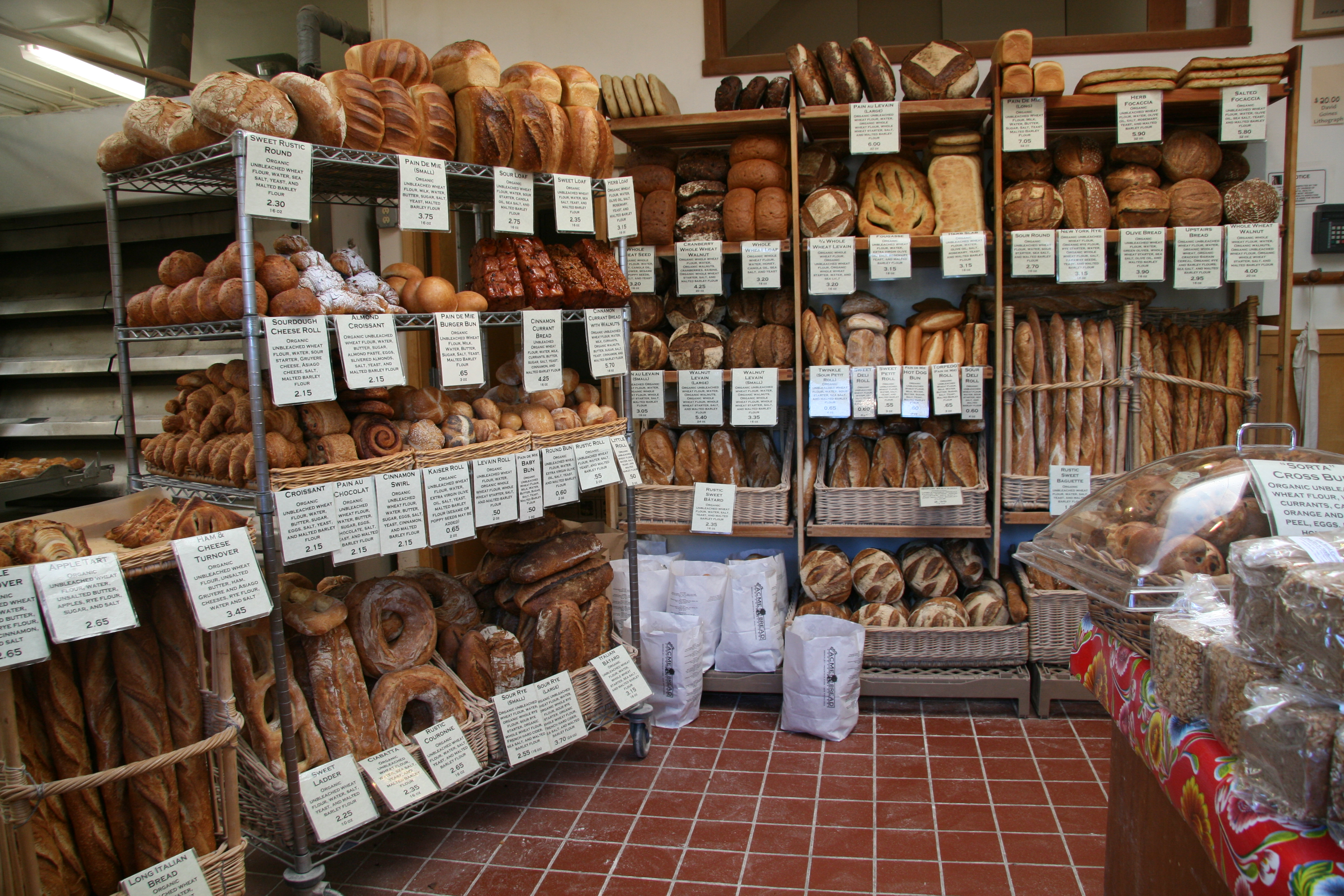
Breads at Acme Bread Company

Bonnie Blue Southern Market & Bakery

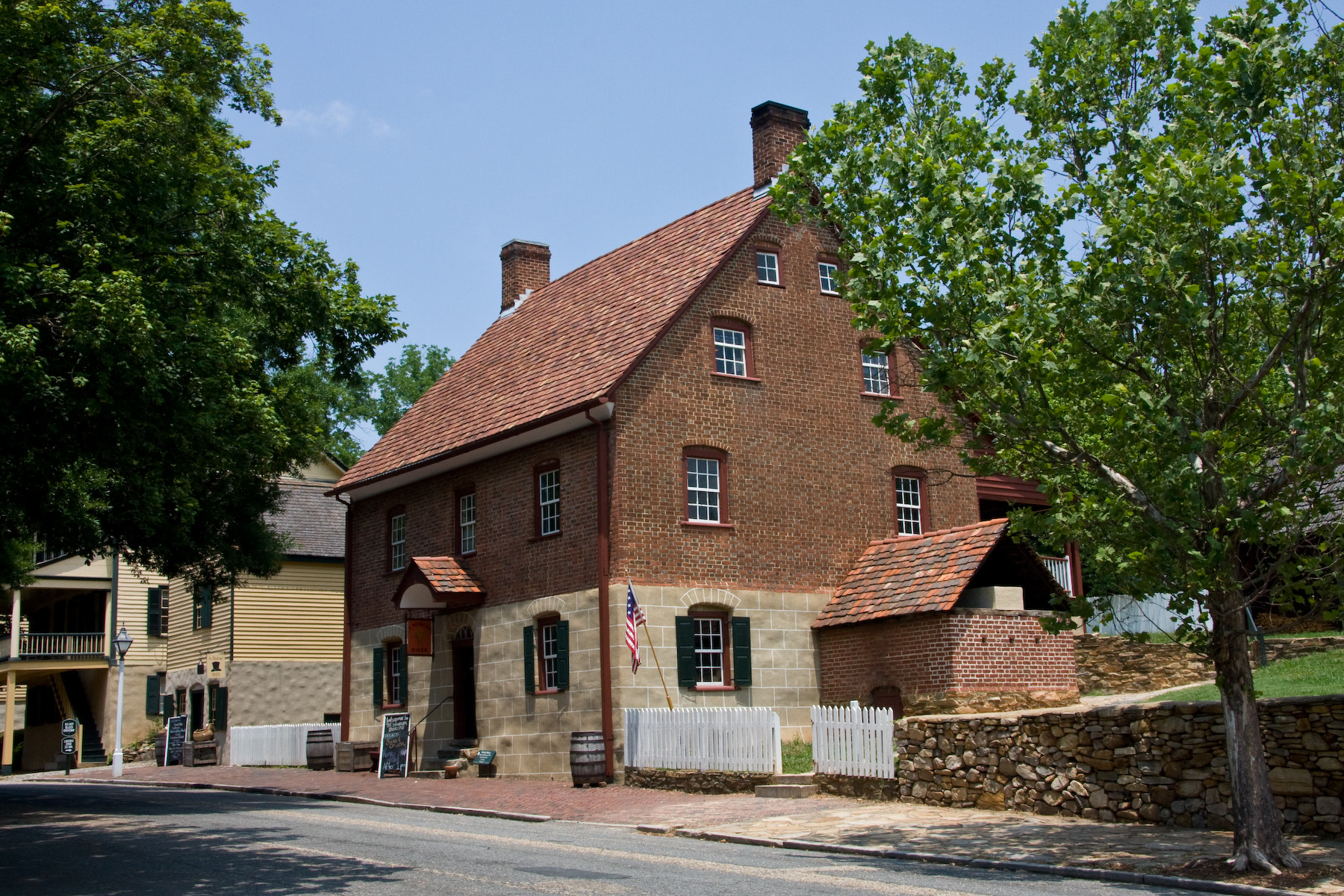
C. Winkler Bakery

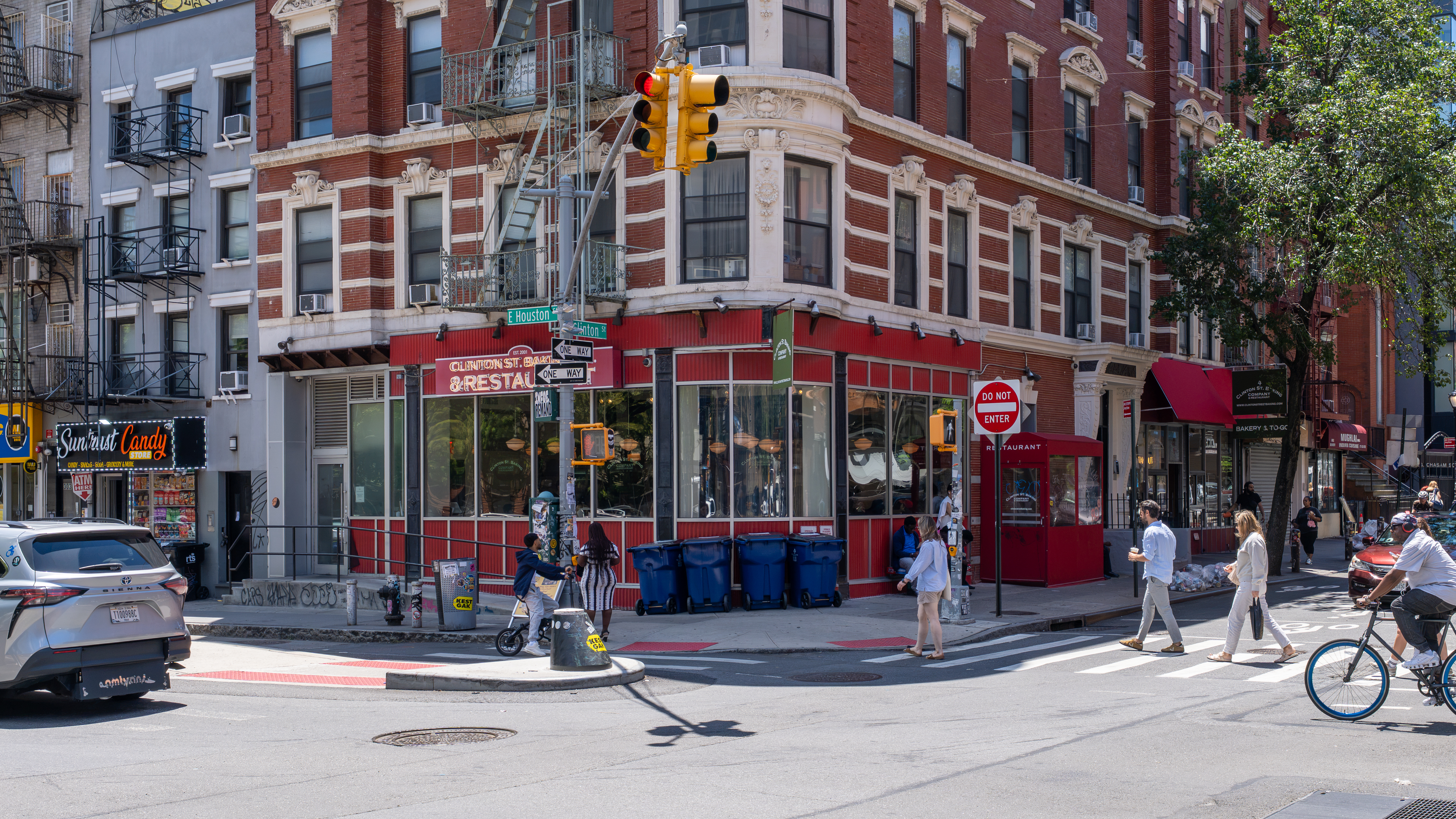
Clinton Street Baking Company & Restaurant

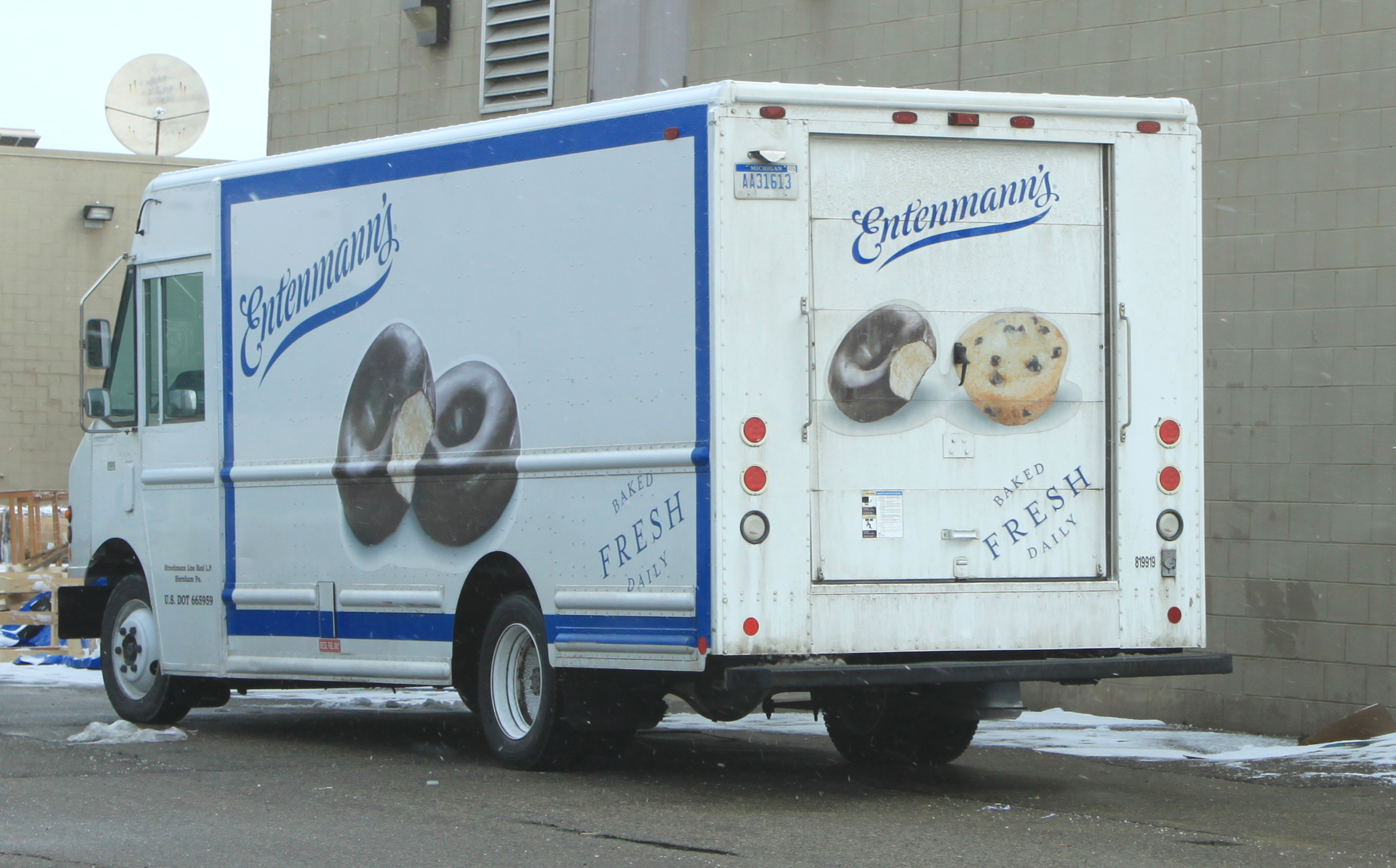
An Entenmann's delivery truck in Ypsilanti, Michigan

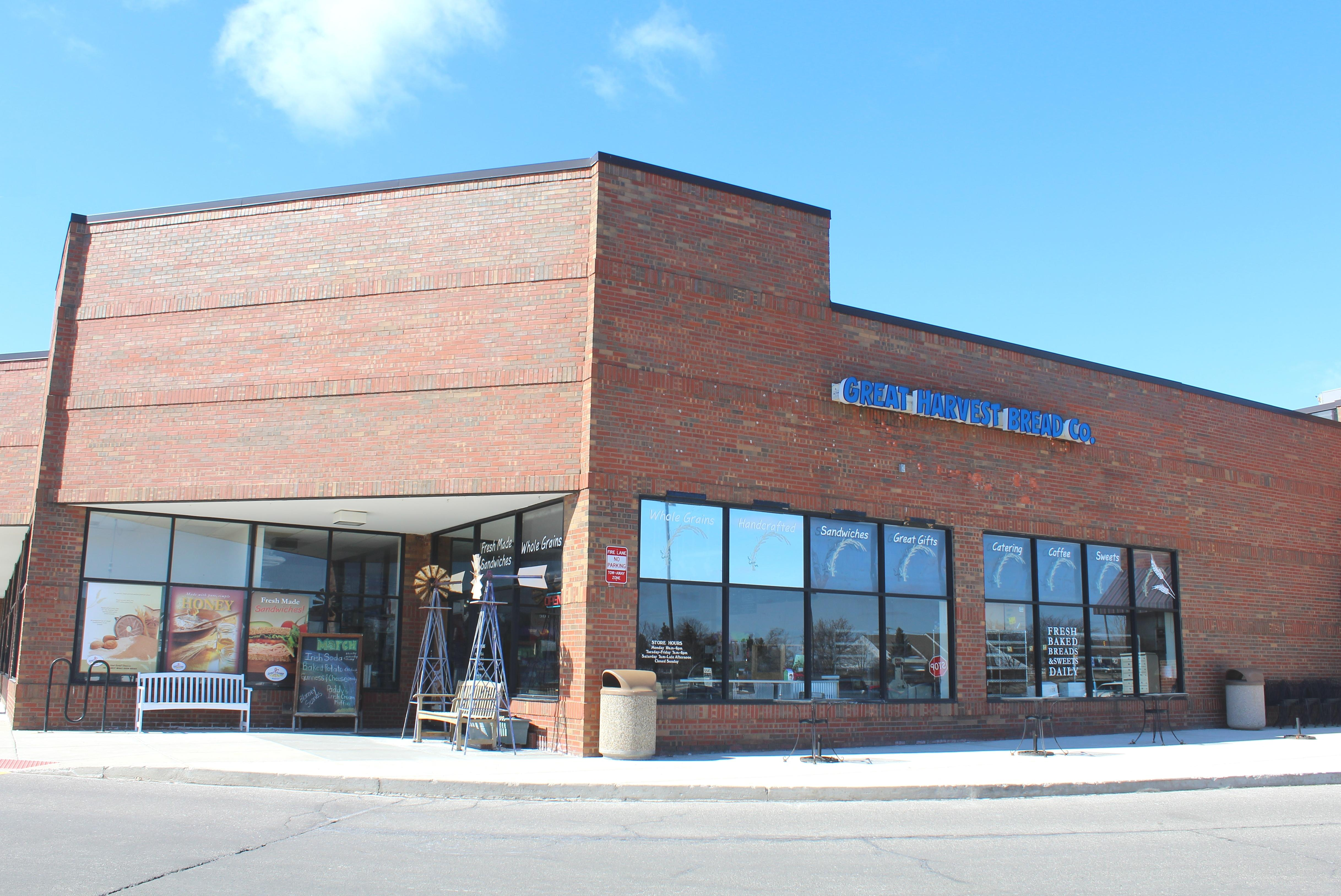
A Great Harvest Bread Company store in Ann Arbor, Michigan

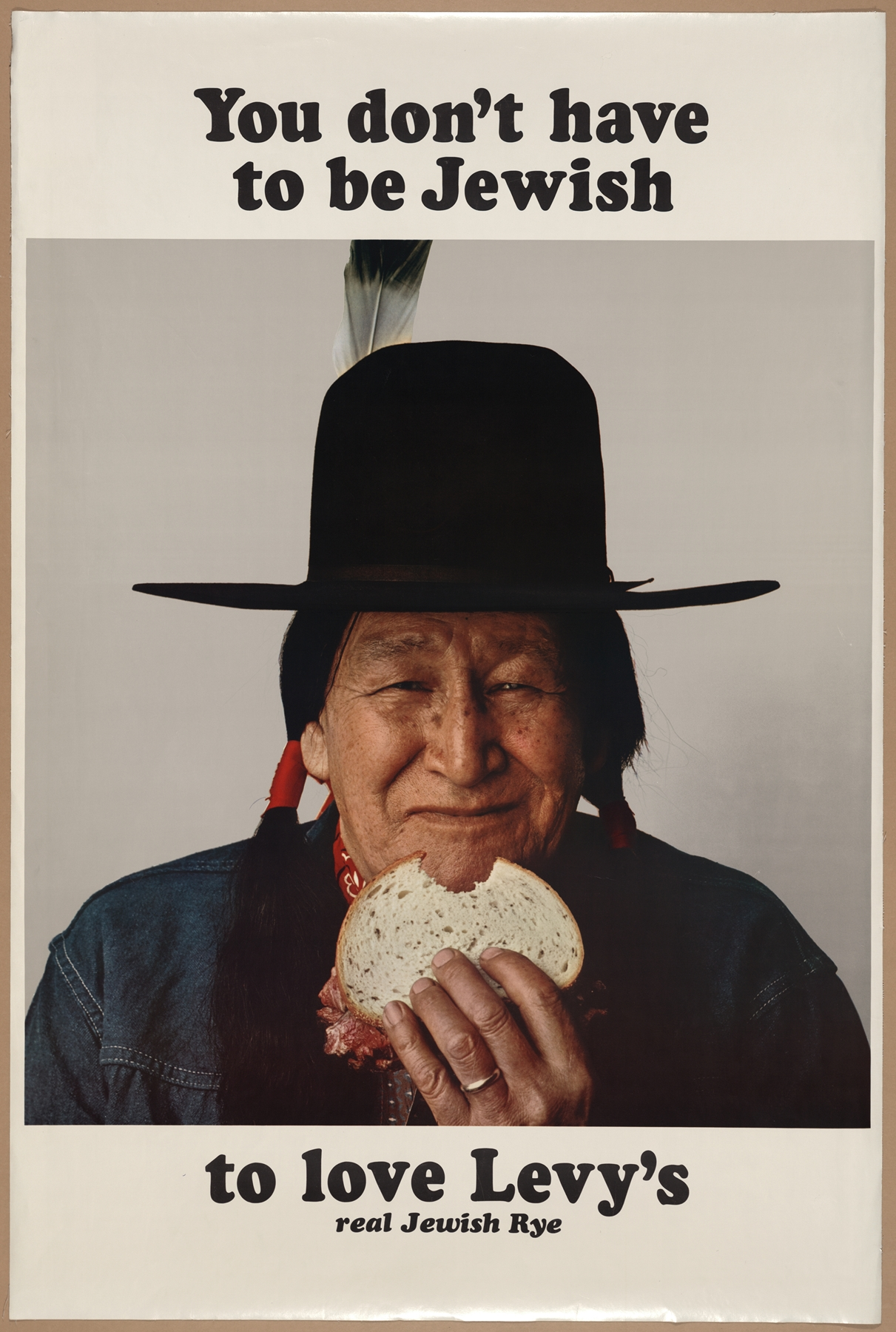
Henry S. Levy and Sons poster

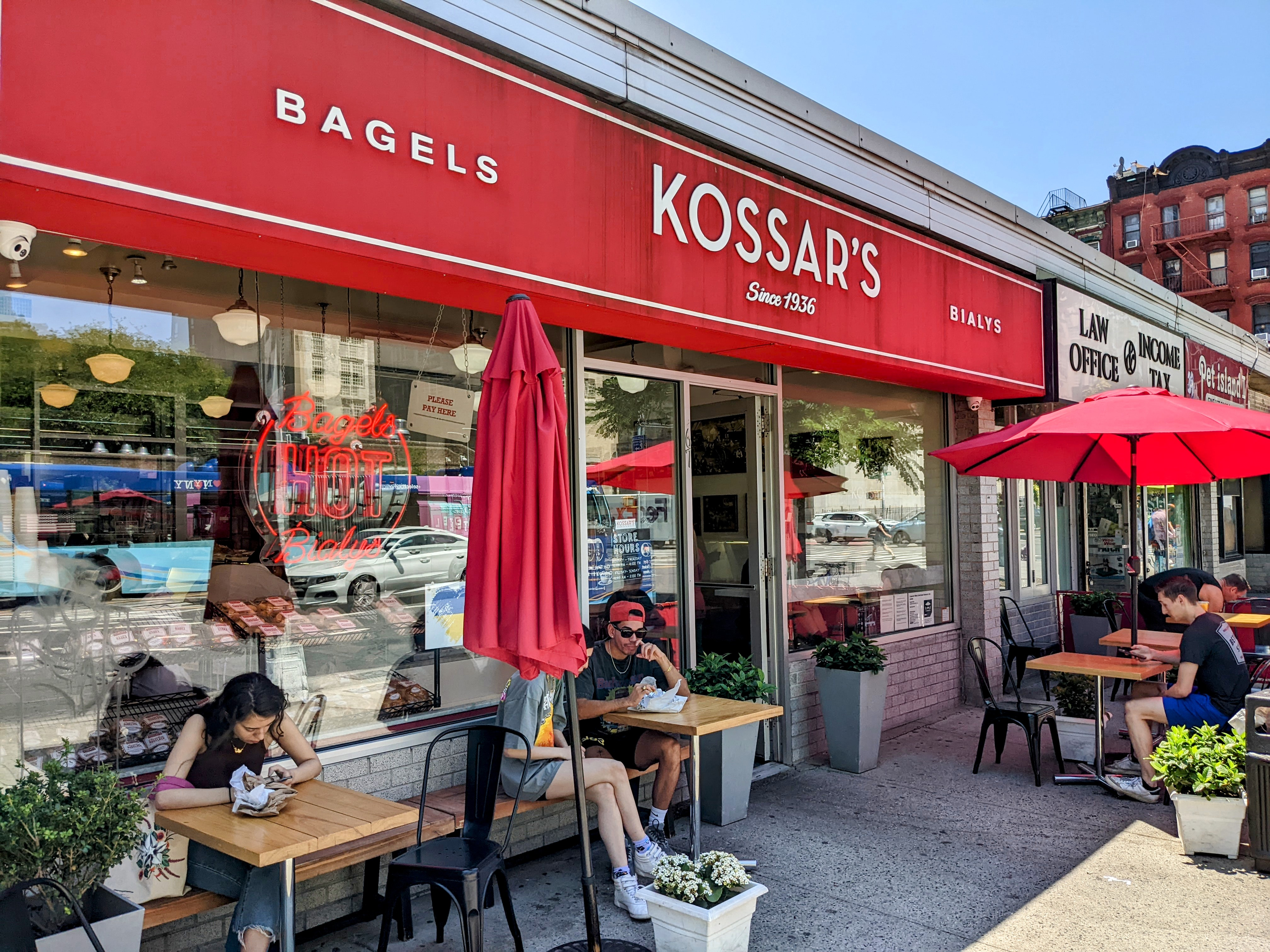
Kossar's Bialys

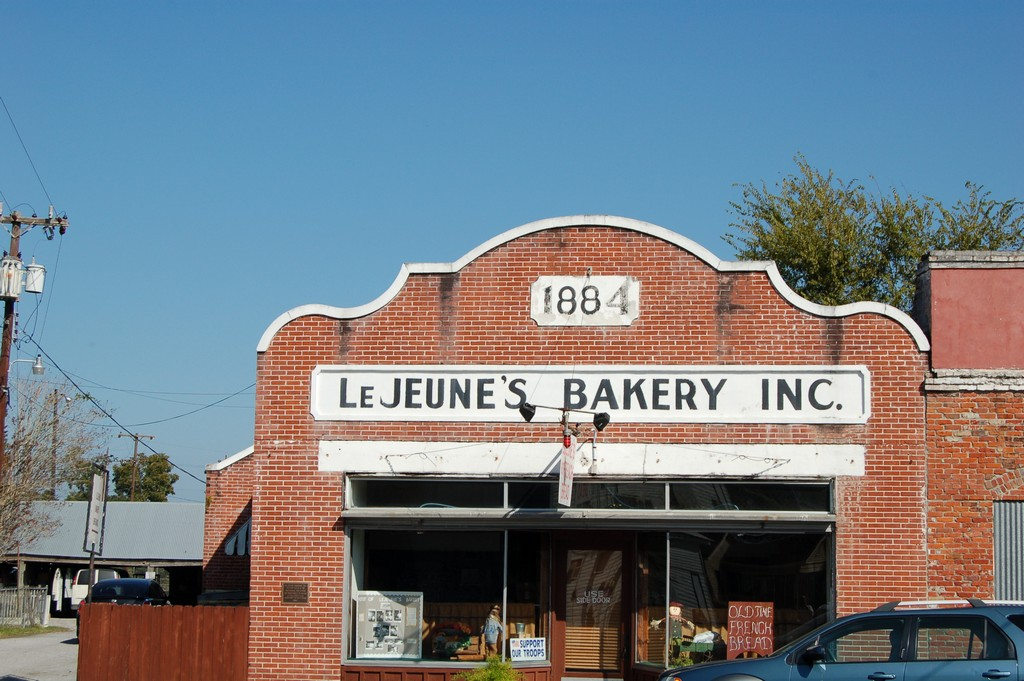
LeJeune's Bakery

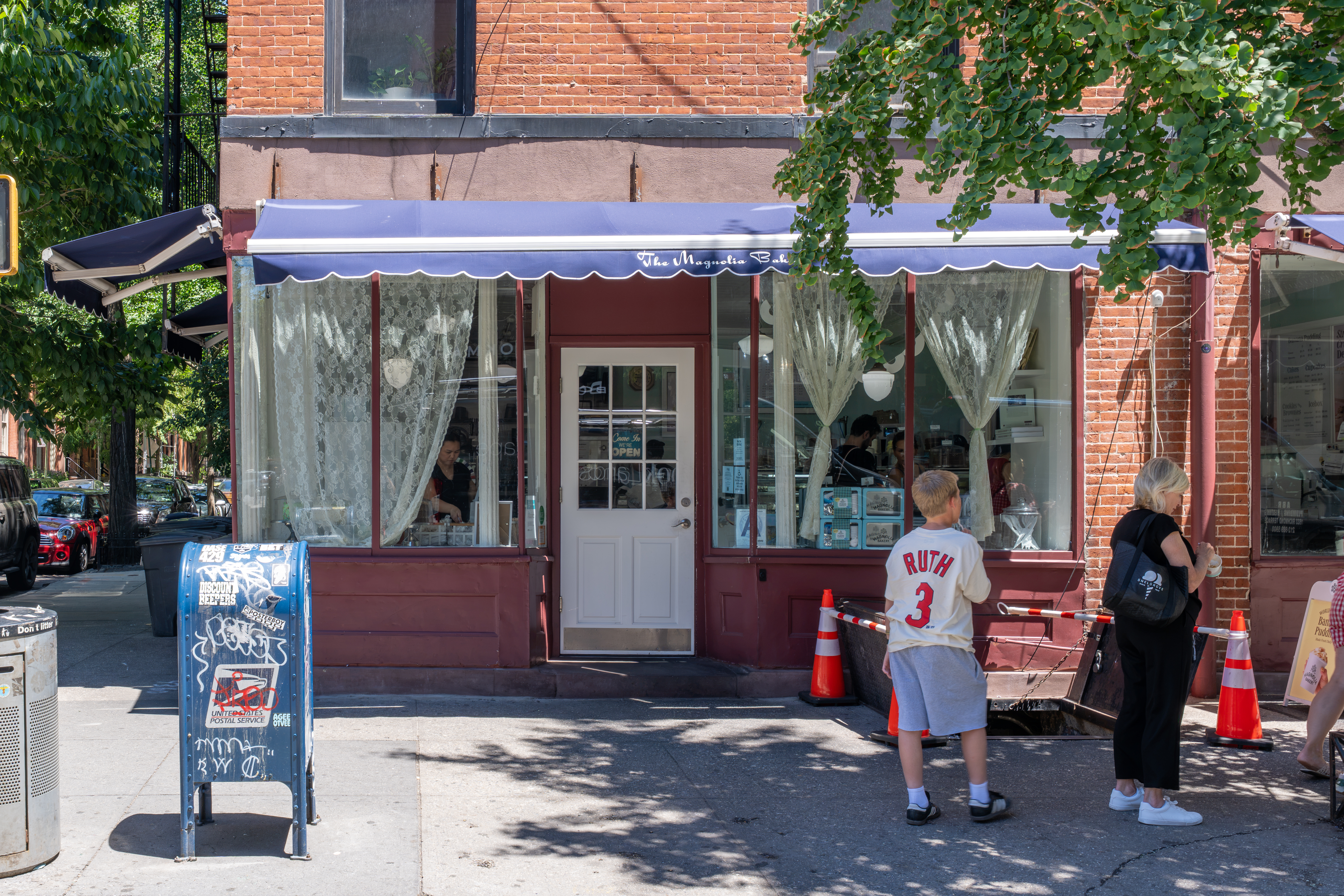
Magnolia Bakery

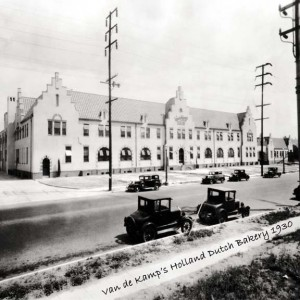
The former Van de Kamp's Holland Dutch Bakeries bakery in Los Angeles, California

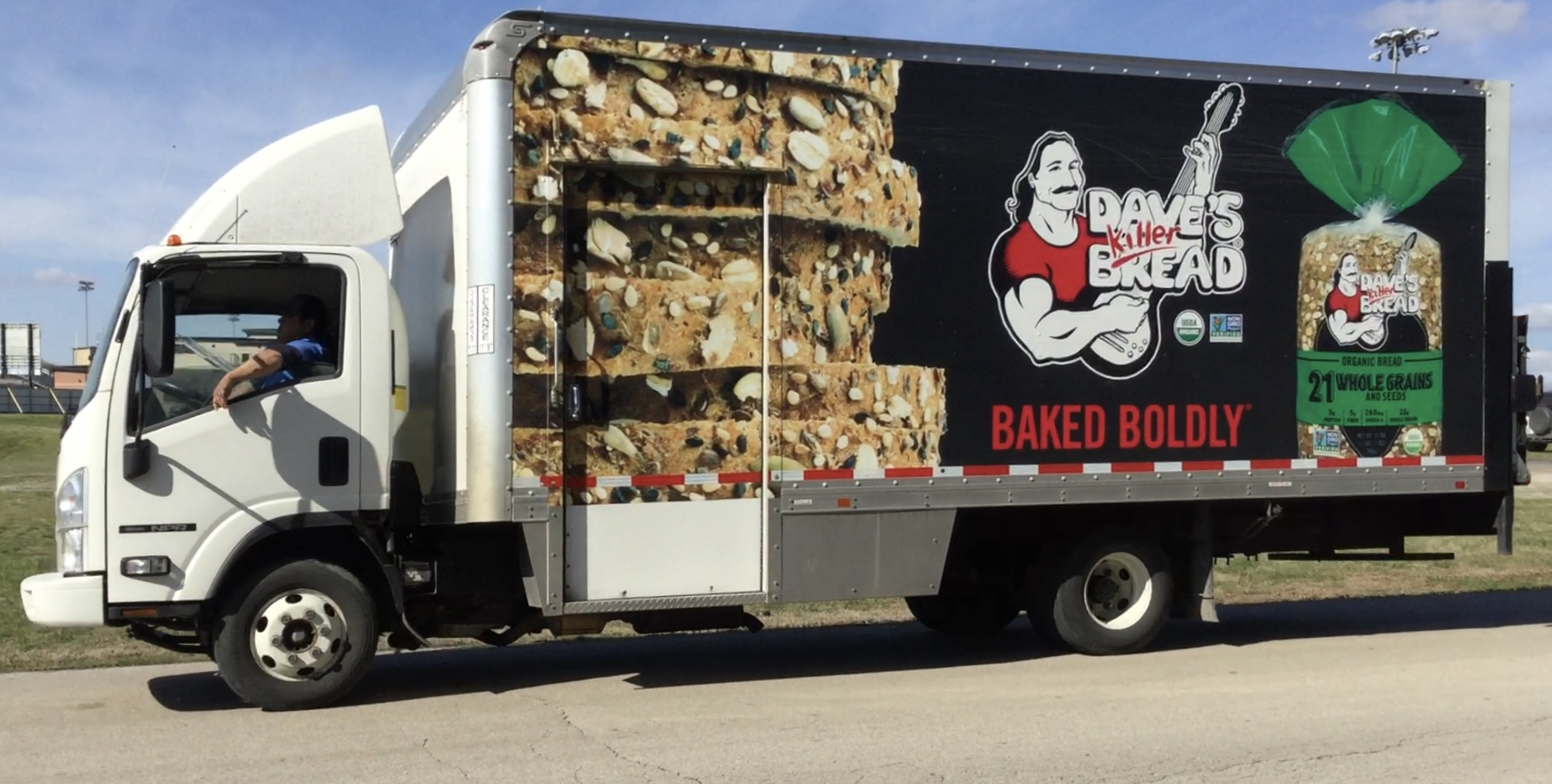
Dave's Killer Bread delivery truck in Oklahoma

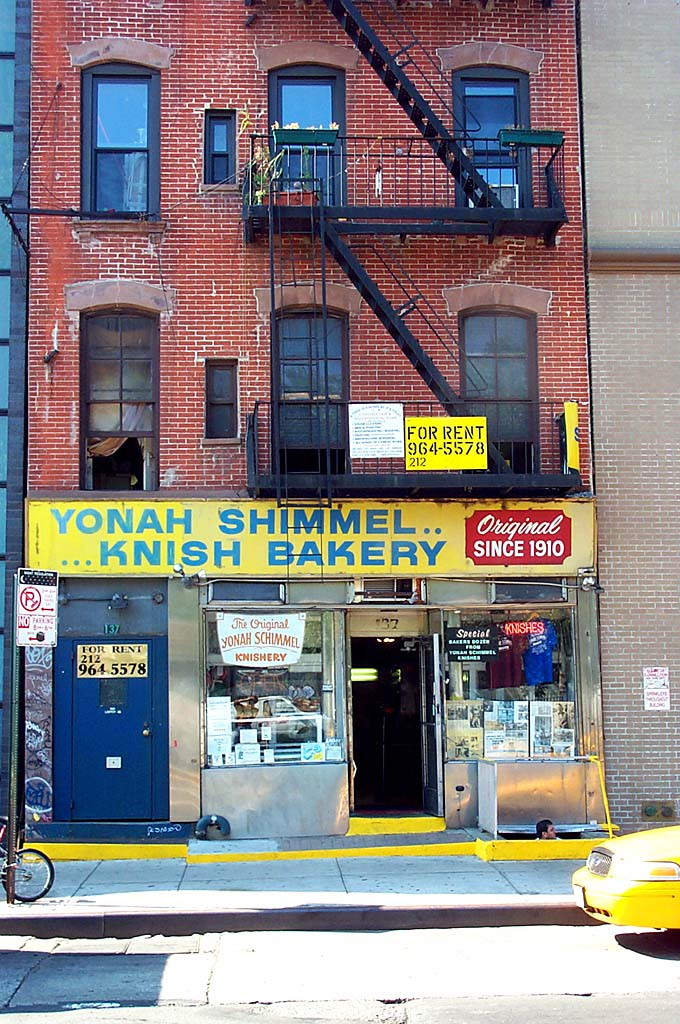
Yonah Shimmel's Knish Bakery in Manhattan, New York City

- Acme Bread Company
- Alessi Bakery
- An Xuyên Bakery
- Askatu Bakery
- Archway Cookies
- Arizmendi Bakery
- Arnold Bakery
- Atlanta Bread Company
- Au Bon Pain
- Auntie Anne's
- Ava Bakery
- Ayu Bakehouse
- Baked & Wired
- Baked by Melissa
- Bakers Bench
- Bakery Nouveau
- Bakeshop
- Bánh by Lauren
- Bella's Italian Bakery
- Ben's Bread Co.
- Berlu
- Big Apple Bagels
- Bimbo Bakeries USA
- Bipartisan Cafe
- Blackbird Bakery
- Blue Chip Cookies
- Bonnie Blue Southern Market & Bakery
- Boudin Bakery
- Bowery Bagels
- Breadsmith
- Brownberry
- Bruegger's
- The Burque Bakehouse
- Burry's
- C. Winkler Bakery
- Café du Monde
- Café Hagen
- Caracas Bakery
- Carlo's Bake Shop
- Cavanagh Company
- Champagne Poetry Patisserie
- Cinnabon
- Cinnaholic
- Cinnamon Works
- Clinton Street Baking Company & Restaurant
- Coco's Bakery
- Collin Street Bakery
- Comadre Panadería
- The Confectional
- Cookies by Design
- Corner Bakery Cafe
- Country Bird Bakery
- Country Club Bakery
- Crumbs Bake Shop
- Crumbville, TX
- The Crumpet Shop
- Cupcake Royale
- Czech Stop and Little Czech Bakery
- Dahlia Bakery
- Dancing Deer Baking Co.
- Dave's Killer Bread
- Dewey's Bakery
- Diane's Place
- Dong Phuong Oriental Bakery
- Dorsch's White Cross Bakery
- Dos Hermanos Bakery
- Elsasser Bakery
- Eltana
- Enrico Biscotti Company
- Entenmann's
- Erick Schat's Bakkerÿ
- Evergreen Butcher and Baker
- F. A. Kennedy Steam Bakery
- Farina Bakery
- Fat Cupcake
- Federal Pretzel Baking Company
- Flour & Flower
- Flowers Foods
- Franklin Cider Mill
- French Meadow Bakery
- Fuchs Bakery
- Fuji Bakery
- Georgetown Bagelry
- Georgetown Cupcake
- Goddess and the Baker
- Golden Gate Fortune Cookie Company
- Grand Central Bakery
- Great American Cookies
- Great Harvest Bread Company
- Greyston Bakery
- Gus's Pretzels
- Gusto Bread
- Heiner's Bakery
- Helen Bernhard Bakery
- Hello Robin
- Henry S. Levy and Sons
- HeyDay
- Honey Dew Donuts
- Hostess Brands
- Il Fornaio
- Insomnia Cookies
- JinJu Patisserie
- Joan's on Third
- Kanemitsu Bakery
- King's Hawaiian
- Kinnamōns
- Kiss My Bundt Bakery
- Koffeteria
- Kossar's Bialys
- Krispy Kreme
- La Bou
- La Brea Bakery
- La Parisienne French Bakery
- La Provence and Petite Provence
- La Segunda Bakery
- Lady M
- Lagniappe Bakehouse
- Le Fournil
- Le Macaron
- Le Panier
- Leidenheimer Baking Company
- LeJeune's Bakery
- Lender's Bagels
- Leonard's Bakery
- Levain Bakery
- Liguria Bakery
- Little T American Baker
- Loaf Lounge
- Loblolly Bakery
- Lou The French On The Block
- Lovejoy Bakers
- Lowrider Cookie Company
- Lundberg Bakery
- Lyndell's Bakery
- Lysée
- Machine Shop
- Macrina Bakery
- Magnolia Bakery
- Martin's Famous Pastry Shoppe, Inc.
- Mei Sum Bakery
- Mel the Bakery
- Milwaukie Pastry Kitchen
- Mondelez International
- Moonrise Bakery
- Mother's Cookies
- Mt. Bagel
- New Cascadia Traditional
- Nuvrei
- Old London Foods
- Orange & Blossom
- Orwasher's bakery
- Oxbow
- Oyatsupan Bakers
- Panera Bread
- Paradise Bakery & Café
- Pepperidge Farm
- Petunia's Pies & Pastries
- Pike Place Bakery
- Pinoyshki Bakery & Cafe
- Pipsqueak Bagels
- Piroshky Piroshky
- Pix Pâtisserie
- Publix
- R+M Dessert Bar
- Racine Danish Kringles
- Raised Doughnuts
- Regent Bakery and Cafe
- Rheinlander Bakery
- Rhino Foods
- Roeser's Bakery
- Rubinstein Bagels
- Saint Bread
- Saint Cupcake
- Schlotzsky's
- Schmidt Baking Company
- Sebastiano's
- Semifreddi's Bakery
- Spielman Bagels & Coffee
- Shipley Do-Nuts
- St. Honoré Boulangerie
- Stroehmann
- Sturgis Pretzel House
- Sugar Bakery & Cafe
- Sweetpea Baking Company
- Table Talk Pies
- Tabor Bread
- Tanaka
- Tartine
- Tastykake
- Tatte Bakery & Café
- Temple Pastries
- Thanh Son Tofu and Bakery
- Three Girls Bakery
- Townie Bagels
- Twisted Croissant
- Udi's Healthy Foods
- United States Bakery
- Vegan Treats Bakery
- Veniero's
- When Pigs Fly Bakery
- Yonah Shimmel's Knish Bakery
- Yummy House Bakery
- Zaro's Bakery
- ZU Bakery
- Zuckercreme

=== Vietnam ===
- Alimentos Polar
- Kinh Do Corporation

== By type ==
=== Bakery cafes ===
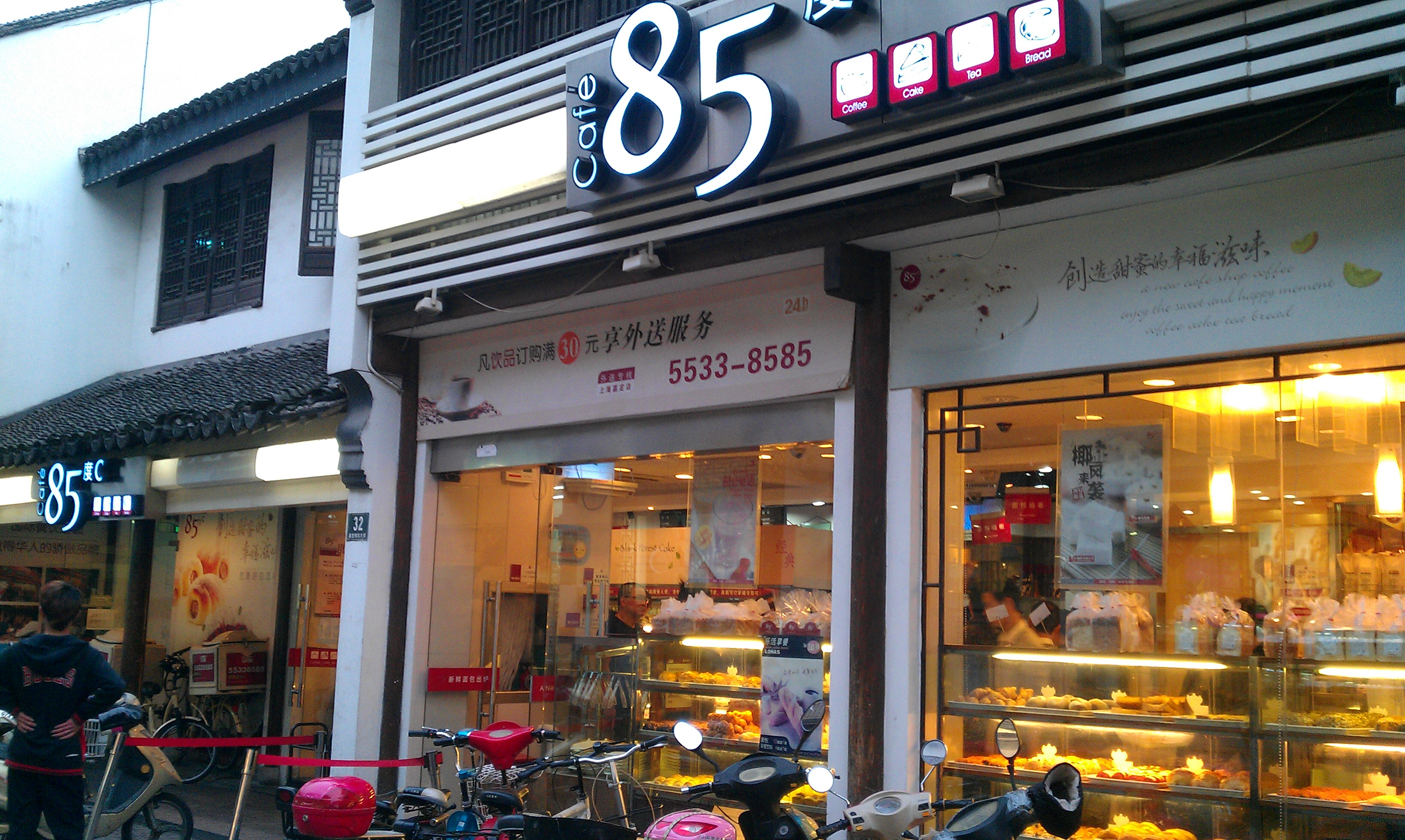
An 85C Bakery Cafe in Shanghai, China

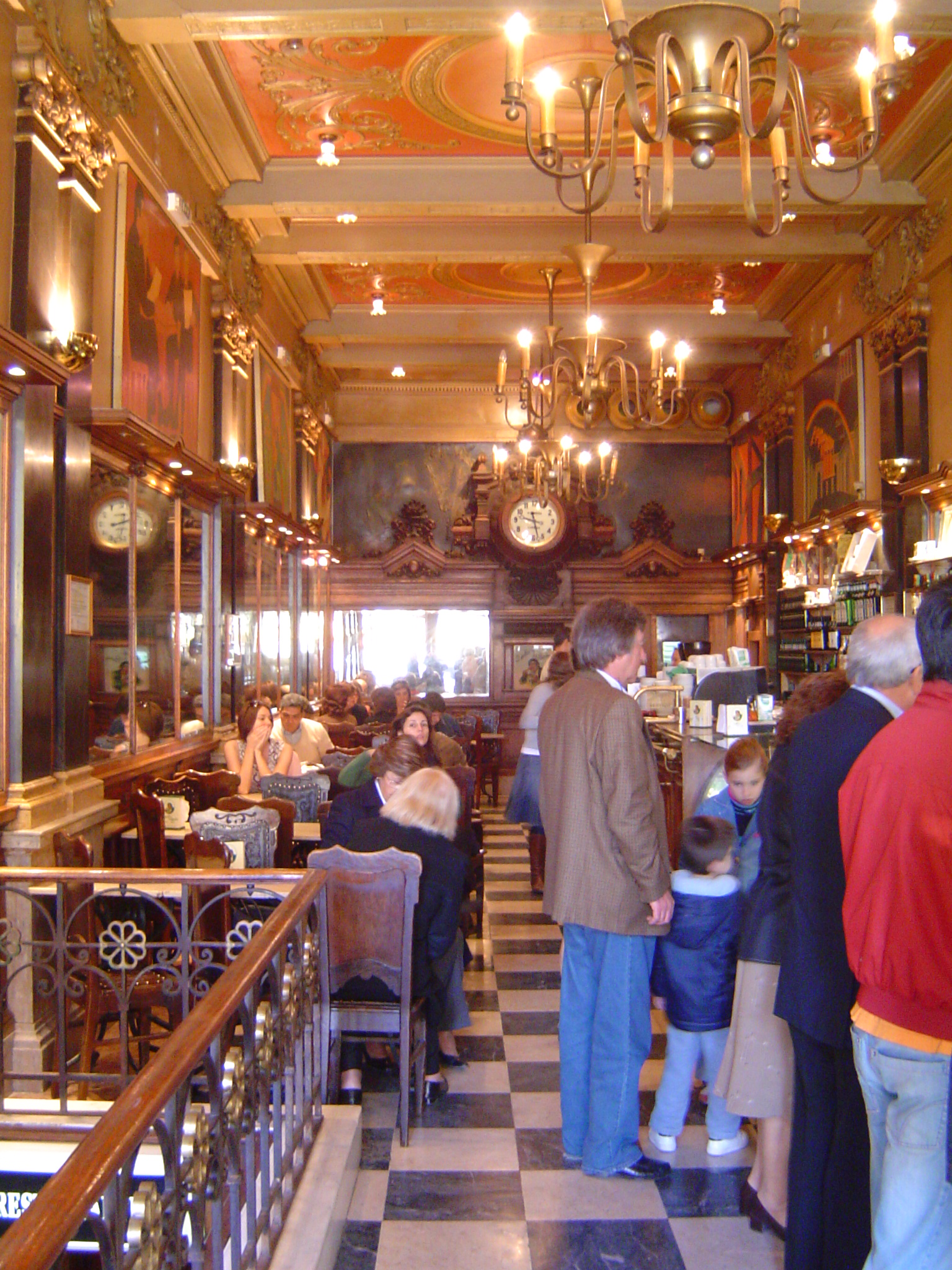
Customers at the Café A Brasileira in Lisbon, Portugal

This is a list of notable bakery cafés. Some retail bakeries are also coffeehouses, serving coffee and tea to customers who wish to consume the baked goods on the premises. A café, cafe, or "caff" may refer to a coffeehouse, bar, teahouse, diner, transport cafe, or other casual eating and drinking place, depending on the culture.

- 85°C Bakery Cafe – Taiwan-based retail food chain
- Atlanta Bread Company – Fast-food chain of the United States
- Au Bon Pain – American bakery and cafe chain
- Bakers Delight – Australian bakery chain franchise
- Big Apple Bagels – American franchised chain
- Blue Chip Cookies – American bakery chain
- Boudin Bakery – Californian baked good company
- Bread Ahead – British bakery chain
- Breadsmith – Wisconsin-based bakery franchise organization
- Brioche Dorée – French bakery franchise
- Bruegger's – Restaurant operator in the United States
- Café A Brasileira – Café in Lisbon, in the old quarter Chiado
- Café de la Paix – Parisian café
- Café du Monde – Café in New Orleans, Louisiana
- Café Landtmann – Traditional Viennese café in Innere Stadt, Austria
- Café Procope – Restaurant in Paris, France
- Cinnabon – American baked goods store chain
- Coco's Bakery – U.S. casual dining restaurant chain
- Corner Bakery Cafe – American chain of cafes
- Délifrance – International company specialising in French bakery products
- Dewey's Bakery – Bakeries of the United States
- Dôme – Australian chain of European-style café restaurants
- East Beach Cafe – Cafe in Littlehampton, West Sussex
- Einstein Bros. Bagels – American bagel and coffee chain
- Goldilocks Bakeshop – Bakery chain in the Philippines
- Gourmet Foods – Pakistani food manufacturer
- Greggs – Bakery chain in the United Kingdom
- Gus's – Cafe in Canberra, Australia
- Irani café – Iranian style of café in South Asia
- Italian Tomato – Japanese restaurant company
- Joan's on Third – Food store and restaurant in Los Angeles
- La Bou – Cafe chain in California
- La Brea Bakery – Bakery company based in Los Angeles, US
- La Madeleine – Restaurant chain in the United States
- Lady M – American cake and confectionery boutique chain
- Lagkagehuset – Danish bakery chain
- Le Pain Quotidien – International chain of bakery-restaurants
- Lee's Sandwiches – Vietnamese-American restaurant chain
- Les Deux Magots – Café in the 6th arrondissement of Paris
- Mmmuffins – Canadian restaurant chain
- Monginis – Indian bakery chain
- Montreal Arts Interculturels – Cultural organization in Montreal, Quebec, Canada
- Muffin Break – International cafe franchise
- Newk's Eatery – Restaurant chain in the United States
- OldTown White Coffee – Malaysian restaurant chain
- Original Pantry Cafe – Coffee shop and restaurant in Los Angeles, California
- Panera Bread – American restaurant chain
- Paradise Bakery & Café – Arizona based casual restaurant chain
- Paris Baguette – South Korean international bakery chain
- Paul – French bakery chain
- Perkins Restaurant and Bakery – American restaurant chain
- Pie Face – Australian fast food chain
- Red Ribbon Bakeshop – Filipino bakery chain
- Robin's Donuts – Canadian fast food chain
- Rotiboy – Malaysian multinational bakery chain
- Schlotzsky's – American restaurant franchise chain
- Tim Hortons – Canadian multinational coffeehouse and restaurant chain
- Top Pot Doughnuts – American doughnut cafe chain
- Upper Crust – Chain of baguette restaurants
- Veniero's – Italian bakery
- Yatala Pie Shop – Pie shop in Queensland, Australia

=== Kosher bakeries ===
- Angel Bakeries
- Berman's Bakery
- Grodzinski Bakery
- Yonah Shimmel's Knish Bakery

== See also ==
- Baker
- Fast casual restaurant
- List of baked goods
- List of coffeehouse chains
- List of doughnut shops
- List of food companies
- Lists of restaurants
- List of teahouses
- Pâtisserie
- Pie shop
- Types of restaurant
- List of butcher shops
