= Ava Bakery =

Restaurant in Phoenix, Arizona, U.S.

- Interactive map of Ava Bakery

Restaurant information
- Food type: Persian
- Location: 814 E. Union Hills Dr., Phoenix, Arizona, 85024, United States
- Coordinates: 33°39′22″N 112°03′45″W

Ava Bakery was a Persian bakery and restaurant in Phoenix, Arizona. It opened in October 2022. The menu included burgers and sandwiches, sangak and barbari breads, as well as a Persian breakfast with bread, butter, cheese, jam, and walnuts. In 2024, the bakery was a semifinalist in the Best New Restaurant category of the James Beard Foundation Awards. It was put up for sale in 2024 and has since closed.

== See also ==
- List of bakeries
- List of defunct restaurants of the United States
