= Gusto Bread =

Bakery in Long Beach, California, U.S.

- Interactive map of Gusto Bread

Restaurant information
- Location: 2710 East 4th Street, Long Beach, California, 90814, United States
- Coordinates: 33°46′18″N 118°09′35″W

Gusto Bread is a bakery in Long Beach, California, United States.

== Reception ==
In 2024, the business was included in The New York Times's list of the 22 best bakeries in the nation.

== See also ==
- List of bakeries
