= The Burque Bakehouse =

- Interactive map of The Burque Bakehouse

Restaurant information
- Established: 2015
- Location: 640 Broadway Blvd. SE, Albuquerque, Bernalillo County, New Mexico, 87102, United States
- Coordinates: 35°4′38″N 106°38′44″W

The Burque Bakehouse is a bakery in Albuquerque, New Mexico.

== See also ==
- List of bakeries
