= ZU Bakery =

Bakery in Portland, Maine, U.S.

- Interactive map of ZU Bakery

Restaurant information
- Location: 81 Clark Street, Portland, Maine, 04102, United States
- Coordinates: 43°38′54″N 70°15′52″W

ZU Bakery is a bakery located at 81 Clark Street in Portland, Maine, owned by Barak Olins.

The bakery won a James Beard Award in 2024 in the category of outstanding bakery.

== History ==
ZU Bakery was founded in 2000 by Barak Olins in his brother and sister-in-law's barn in Freeport, Maine. At this time ZU Bakery sold baked goods at the Brunswick Farmer's Market.

It moved to Clark Street in Portland's West End in 2022. There, the bakery uses wood-fired ovens to bake French-style pastries.

It won the James Beard Foundation Award for Outstanding Bakery in 2024, which honors a bakery for outstanding baked goods, atmosphere, and connection to community.

== Description ==
ZU Bakery specializes in bread loaves which Olins mills himself. In addition to traditional French-style pastries and breads, it bakes Irish scones and Italian biscotti.

The bakery prepares different items throughout the day, rather than preparing the bulk of their offerings before opening. Typically, pastries like croissants are ready earliest, then breads by midday, and savory goods like pizza in the afternoon.

== See also ==
- List of bakeries
