= Brooklyn Boy Bagels =

Australian bakery

- Industry: Food and beverage
- Founded: 2013
- Founder: Michael Shafran
- Headquarters: Marrickville, Australia
- Products: Bagels, bakery goods
- Owner: Michael Shafran
- Number of employees: 10-50
- Website: brooklynboy.com.au

Brooklyn Boy Bagels is a bakery and cafe in Sydney, Australia. The business specialises in New York-style bagels and other bakery goods. Their products have won several awards.

== History ==
Brooklyn Boy Bagels was founded in 2013 by Brooklyn-born food journalist Michael Shafran, the first baker to bring New York City bagels to Sydney, Australia. He wanted to emulate the authentic process in his hometown for making bagels, including boiling the dough.

The company has operated from a variety of locations, including Matraville, Marrickville, Circular Quay, and Surry Hills.

== Awards and recognition ==
Vogue magazine has rated Brooklyn Boy amongst the best bagels in Australia. Time Out magazine awarded the title of "Favourite Sandwich" to Brooklyn Boy in 2021. It was also declared the "Best Bagel in Sydney" in 2013.

== See also ==
- List of bakeries
- List of brand name breads
