= Diane's Place =

Bakery and restaurant in Minneapolis, Minnesota, U.S.

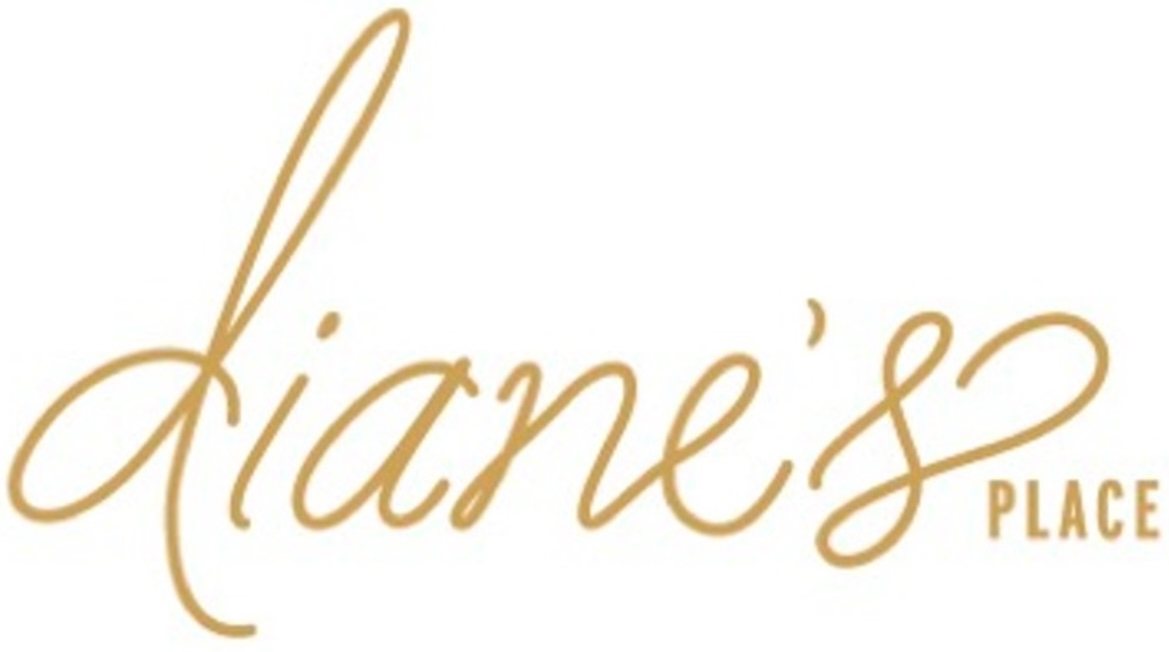
- Interactive map of Diane's Place

Restaurant information
- Owner: Diane Moua
- Head chef: Diane Moua
- Food type: Hmong American cuisine
- Location: 117 14th Avenue NE, Minneapolis, Minnesota, United States
- Coordinates: 45°0′5.5″N 93°16′13.3″W

Diane's Place is a restaurant in Minneapolis, Minnesota, United States. It opened in the spring of 2024 in the Food Building in Northeast Minneapolis. The restaurant is owned and operated by chef Diane Moua, who is a James Beard Award-nominated pastry chef. Diane's Place serves breakfast, brunch, lunch, and dinner, featuring dishes that blend Hmong American comfort food with culinary techniques that Moua has learned throughout her career. The menu includes traditional Hmong cuisine using ingredients partly sourced from Moua's parents' farm in Wisconsin.

Diane's Place has gained national recognition and was named Food & Wine magazine's 2025 Restaurant of the Year. The magazine praised the restaurant for its high level of service, hospitality, and the way it shares Hmong food traditions with the Minneapolis community. The restaurant also received a two-star review from the New York Times shortly before receiving this award. Diane Moua has been nominated for James Beard Awards in the categories Best Pastry Chef and Best Chef Midwest. The restaurant was named Minnesota Monthly's Best New Restaurant of 2024.

Moua named the restaurant after herself as a tribute to her family history and personal journey. Her parents, Hmong immigrants who arrived in the U.S. in 1982, have played a significant role in the establishment of the restaurant by providing fresh vegetables and support. The dinner menu features family-style Hmong dishes such as sour pork short ribs and Asian chicken noodle soup (khao piak sen). Moua adapts traditional dishes to make Hmong cuisine accessible to new audiences while preserving their essence.

== See also ==
- List of bakeries
