= Bánh by Lauren =

Bakery in New York City, U.S.

- Interactive map of Bánh by Lauren

Restaurant information
- Location: 42 Market Street, New York, New York, 10002, United States
- Coordinates: 40°42′44″N 73°59′39″W
- Website: banhbylauren.com

Bánh by Lauren is a bakery in the Two Bridges neighborhood of Manhattan in New York City.

In 2024, the business was included in The New York Times's list of the 22 best bakeries in the United States.

== See also ==
- List of bakeries
