= Loaf Lounge =

Bakery cafe in Chicago, Illinois, U.S.

- Interactive map of Loaf Lounge

Restaurant information
- Established: 2022
- Location: 2934 N. Milwaukee Ave., Chicago, Illinois, United States
- Coordinates: 41°56′4.5″N 87°43′0.1″W

Loaf Lounge is a bakery cafe in the Avondale neighborhood of Chicago, Illinois. It opened in 2022 and is owned by chefs Sarah Mispagel-Lustbader and Ben Lustbader.

== History ==
The cafe's origins date to 2020, when Mispagel-Lustbader and Lustbader developed its recipes as a pop-up at Superkhana International in Logan Square before opening the Avondale cafe. Mispagel-Lustbader was a consulting pastry chef for the FX television series The Bear and created the chocolate cake shown in the series.

== Reception ==
In 2023, Chicago magazine placed Loaf Lounge fifth on its list of the city's best new restaurants. In 2024, The New York Times included it in a list of 22 bakeries across the United States.

== See also ==
- List of bakeries
