= Loblolly Bakery =

Bakery in Hattiesburg, Mississippi, U.S.

- Interactive map of Loblolly Bakery

Restaurant information
- Location: Hattiesburg, Mississippi, United States
- Coordinates: 31.32527°N 89.33818°W

Loblolly Bakery is a bakery in Hattiesburg, Mississippi, United States. In 2024, the business was included in The New York Times's list of the 22 best bakeries in the nation.

== See also ==
- List of bakeries
