= Mel the Bakery =

Bakery in Hudson, New York, U.S.

- Interactive map of Mel the Bakery

Restaurant information
- Location: 324 Warren Street, Hudson, New York, 12534, United States
- Coordinates: 42°15′10″N 73°47′24″W

Mel the Bakery is a bakery in Hudson, New York.

== See also ==
- List of bakeries
