= DONQ =

French-style bakery chain in China

DONQ Boulangerie
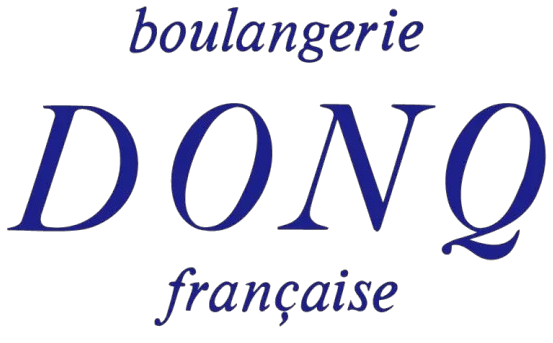

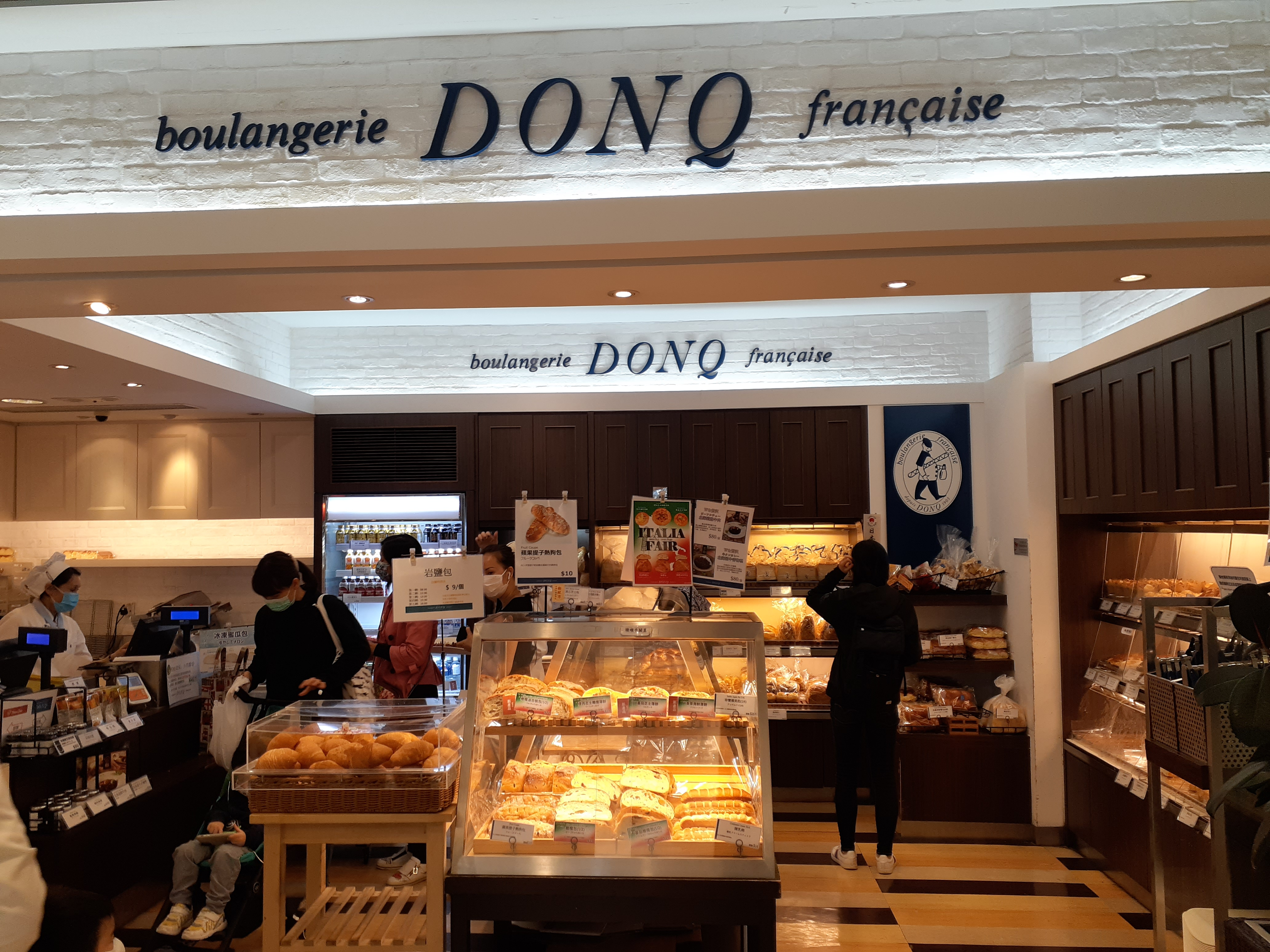
- DONQ in Hong Kong
- Industry: Bread, Cakes, Savouries
- Founder: Motojiro Fujii
- Headquarters: Japan
- Website: https://www.donq.co.jp

Established in 1905 in Kobe, Hyogo prefecture, DONQ Boulangerie is a French-style bakery chain which has expanded to over 140 outlets across Asia like: Singapore, Taiwan, Hong Kong, China (run by franchises) and Thailand. It expanded due to the popularity of its French-styled baking in Japan, such as their baguette, batard, croissants, and other pastries.

== History ==
DONQ was founded in 1905 in Kobe, Japan

DONQ has been part of Bakery Scan's bread identification scanner system trial since September 2012, a camera software that identifies the bread based on image recognition and lists the price on the cashier.

== Trademark ==
In Aug 2018, DONQ (Japanese bakery) filed their logo trademark 7 years after it was opposed by Don Q (a Puerto Rico-based rum maker company) who argued that the similarities in their name would cause confusion.

DonQ Boulangerie
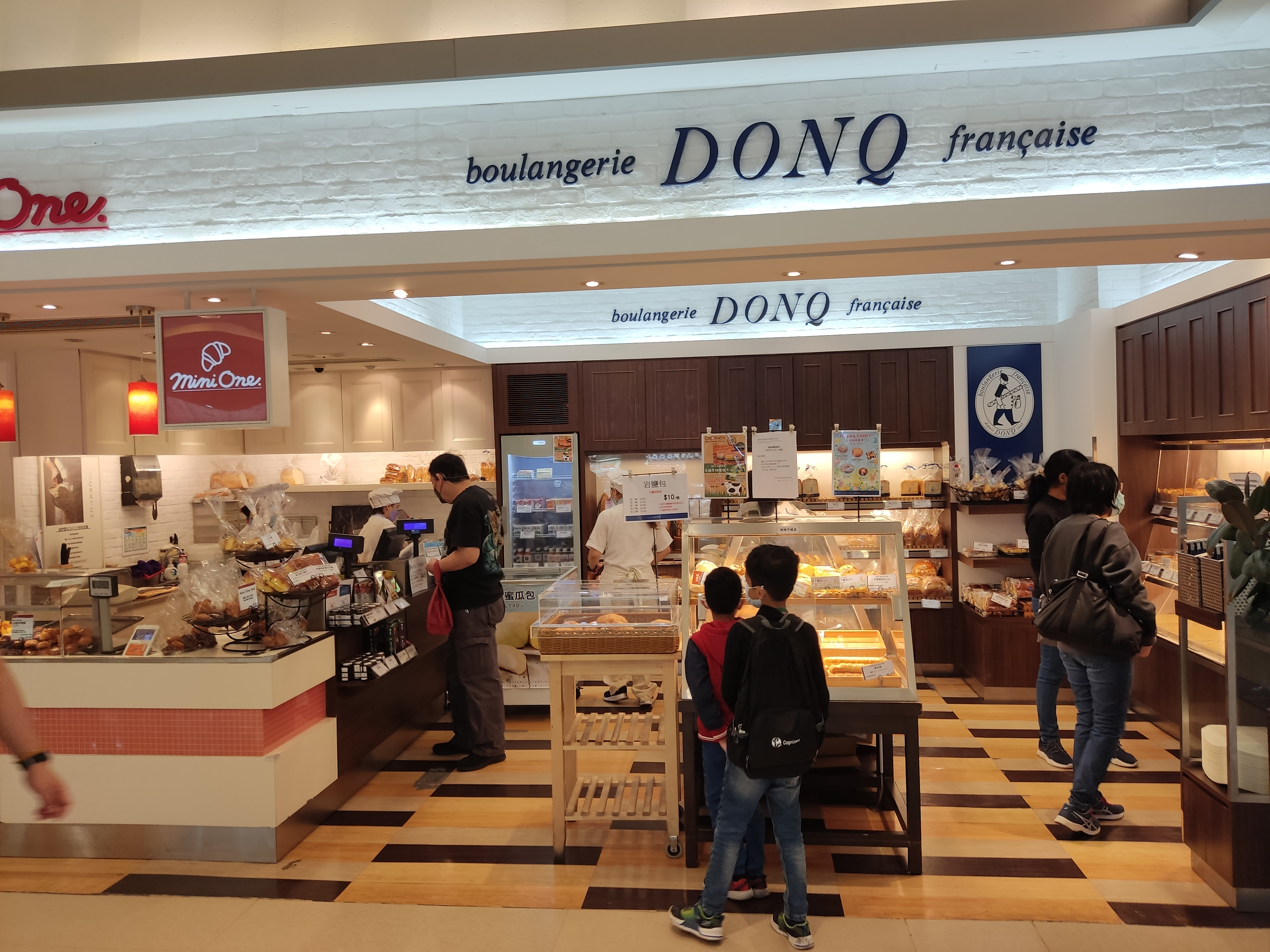
- Hong Kong Tseung Kwan O PopCorn mall boulangerie

== Outlets ==
- Japan
- Hong Kong
- Singapore
- Taiwan
- Thailand
- Malaysia

== See also ==
- List of bakeries
- Bakeries of Japan
