= Lysée =

Bakery in New York City, U.S.

- Interactive map of Lysée

Restaurant information
- Location: 44 East 21st Street, New York City, New York, 10010, United States
- Coordinates: 40°44′21″N 73°59′18″W
- Website: www.lyseenyc.com

Lysée is a bakery in the Flatiron District of Manhattan in New York City, United States headed by Eunji Lee. In 2024, the business was included in The New York Times's list of the 22 best bakeries in the nation.

== See also ==
- List of bakeries
