= Flour & Flower =

Bakery in St. Joseph, Minnesota, U.S.

- Interactive map of Flour & Flower

Restaurant information
- Location: St. Joseph, Minnesota, United States
- Coordinates: 45°33′56″N 94°19′3.5″W

Flour & Flower is a bakery in St. Joseph, Minnesota, United States. In 2024, the business was included in The New York Times's list of the 22 best bakeries in the nation.

== See also ==
- List of bakeries
