= Saidels Bakery =

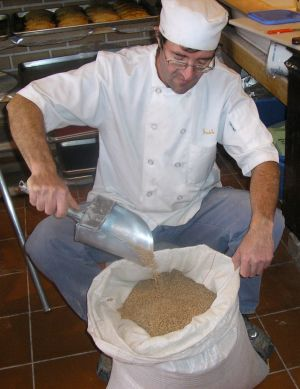
Les Saidel Sorting Organic Wheat

Saidels Bakery (now named Saidel Jewish Baking Center - S.J.B.C) was the first true artisan bakery in Israel. Established by Les and Sheryl Saidel in 2008 and located in the Samarian village of Karnei Shomron, the bakery was originally opened to fill a need for fresh-baked, authentic, artisan and organic healthy Jewish bread.

Its center of operation is the only Ovencrafters designed brick oven in the Middle East, in which all baked products - artisan breads, organic health breads and pastry, are manufactured using ancient artisan methods. The bakery is also notable as the only bakery in the country that grinds its own stone ground organic whole grain flour, using a vintage stone mill.

The Saidel Jewish Baking Center is most noted however for its exclusive "Maimonides Bread"., (also known as Rambam Bread), a health bread that is baked using a unique process, based on the writings of the scholar and physician Maimonides, which reduces the gluten quantity of the bread.

Pioneering the dissemination of knowledge about healthy, artisan baking in Israel, the bakery expanded to become what is now the Saidel Jewish Baking Center (S.J.B.C), a center for training, consulting, conducting exhibitions and demonstrations on anything related to Jewish bread, artisan baking, health and nutrition. The S.J.B.C also offers consulting services, provides lectures and tours for groups or individuals and is instrumental in raising the awareness of the benefits of healthy, old-world style artisan baking.

== Method of Sale ==
Unlike most traditional bakeries which sell directly from a storefront, Saidels Bakery was the first bakery in Israel to adopt an "online, internet sales model"., whereby people from all over Israel order products online and have them delivered directly to their homes. In April 2011 the bakery opened an International Department which allows relatives and friends from all over the world to send their loved ones in Israel a healthy "taste of home", gift baskets, challot, apple pies and more.

== Appearances in the media ==
The "Israelity Blog". Archived from the original on 2012-04-01. reviewed Saidels bakery in a feature article in its October 30, 2008 edition.

"Rusty Mike Radio". Archived from the original on 2010-10-15. featured an interview with Les Saidel in July 2009 during the Independence Day AACI Fair in Jerusalem.

The bakery was also reviewed in the "Telfed magazine"., August 2010.

On November 16, 2011 the Israeli daily "Maariv newspaper". ran an article on Saidels Bakery (English translation "here".).

On March 2, 2012 the "Haaretz Herald Tribune". Archived from the original on March 3, 2012. published an article about Saidel's Hamantaschen (a traditional delicacy eaten on the Jewish festival of Purim).

The April 6, 2013 edition of Hebrew newspaper "Mekor Rishon". ranked the top 15 Israeli boutique bakeries and "Saidels Bakery". was ranked number eight.

The Israeli radio station "Arutz Sheva". ran a 40-minute interview with Les Saidel on April 11, 2013 in the 6:00pm spot.

Israel TV's "Arutz 2 Channel". featured an interview with Les Saidel on the program Ba'im Leshabat, April 26, 2013.

The "Jerusalem Post". featured an article about Les Saidel on May 16, 2013.

In May 2013 Les Saidel began freelancing as a columnist for the Israeli newspaper "The Jerusalem Post". in the Weekend supplement, a column entitled "In The Grain", on the subjects of baking, health and nutrition.

Read an interview with Les Saidel in Israel's "Hamodia" (PDF). newspaper (in English) from December 5, 2013
