= Dewey's Bakery =

Bakeries of the United States

Dewey's Bakery is an American retail bakery offering fresh baked goods including custom cakes, Moravian cookies, cheese straws, and artisan cheese biscuits. Dewey's Bakery originated in Winston-Salem, North Carolina in 1930. The company's classic Moravian Cookies are known to many as “the world’s thinnest cookie," and were selected by O: The Oprah Magazine to be featured on the coveted "O List."

== History ==
Since opening in 1930, Dewey's has been baking traditional favorites, such as Moravian Sugar Cake, Grandma and Grandpa Coffee Cakes, Moravian Lovefeast Buns, and Moravian Cookies. They are made in the homemade tradition with a centuries-old recipe from the ancient region of Moravia, located in what is now the Czech Republic.

In 1992 Dewey's Bakery expanded, creating Salem Baking Company to focus on national distribution of their Moravian spice cookies. Since then, Salem Baking has added additional artisan products including Classic Southern Style Cheese Straws and Cheese Straw Petites, Cheese Biscuits, and Shortbread Cookies.
