= Vegan Treats Bakery =

Vegan bakery in Bethlehem, Pennsylvania, US

Vegan Treats

Restaurant information
- Established: 1998
- Owner: Danielle Konya
- Food type: Desserts
- Dress code: Casual
- Location: 1444 Linden Street, Bethlehem, Pennsylvania, Bethlehem, Pennsylvania, 18018, United States
- Website: vegantreats.com

Vegan Treats Bakery is a vegan bakery located in Bethlehem, Pennsylvania. The bakery serves restaurants in DC, Philadelphia, and New York City as well as has its own retail store at 1444 Linden Street, Bethlehem.

Vegan Treats Bakery has been in operation since 1998. The bakery is completely vegan, using no animal by-products in any of its goods.

Vegan Treats owner Danielle Konya grew up in Northampton County, Pennsylvania, and has kept her business local in the Lehigh Valley. Konya's desserts have earned her a PETA Proggy Award for Best Bakery. She also won an award after competing in PBS's Feast of Sweets. On September 6, 2012, Vegan Treats was named one of the Top Ten Bakeries in the world by American Express' luxury travel website Departures.com.
