= Roeser's Bakery =

Bakeries of the United States

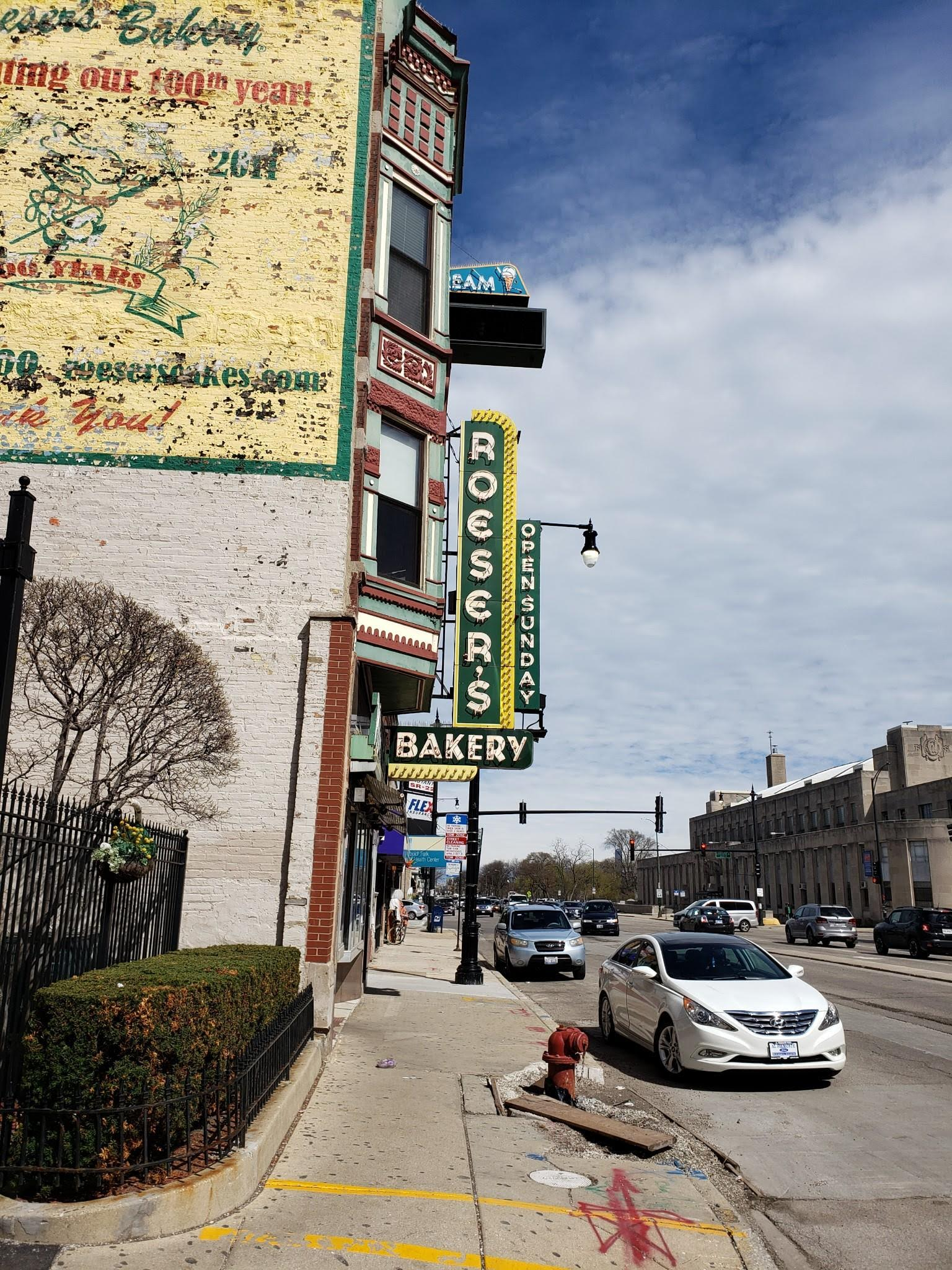
- The neon sign outside of Roeser's Bakery in Chicago, Illinois
- Interactive map of Roeser's Bakery

Restaurant information
- Established: 1911; 115 years ago
- Location: 3216 W. North Ave., Chicago, Illinois, 60647
- Coordinates: 41.9104501°N 87.7075383°W

Roeser's Bakery is a bakery at 3216 W. North Ave. in Chicago, Illinois. It is credited as being the oldest family-owned bakery in Chicago.

== History ==
John Roeser Sr. arrived in the United States from Germany in 1905 and settled in Humboldt Park, a neighborhood in Chicago, Illinois. In 1911, John opened Roeser's Bakery in downtown Chicago. In 1936, John Sr. handed down the bakery to his son, John Roeser Jr. and his wife Barbara. Years later, in the 1970s, Roeser's Bakery was handed down to John Roeser III and his wife, Deb. Over time, the bakery's clientele shifted from German and Scandinavian immigrants to Russian Jewish, Ukrainian, and Polish residents, followed by Puerto Rican residents beginning in the 1960s.

When John Roeser III took over the bakery, Humboldt Park still had a lot of crimes. John III knew how to draw many different gang signs because the gangs paid a lot of money to have custom cakes. Roeser's Bakery was a neutral space in the neighborhood even when crimes happened. John Roeser III believed that as long as he treated people with respect, they will do the same back.

John Roeser IV started in the bakery at the age of ten. Just like every other owner before him, he started his work cleaning floors, washing dishes, and putting cakes in boxes. As he gains more experience, he will be allowed to decorate the cakes. By 2024, John Charles Roeser IV was the bakery's fourth-generation owner.

== In popular culture ==
Roeser's appeared in a first-season episode of the television series The Bear, in which Marcus visits the bakery.
