= Crumbville, TX =

Restaurant information
- Owner: Ella Russell
- Food type: Bakery
- Location: 3809 Sampson St Suite B, Houston, TX, 77004
- Website: crumbvilletx.com

Crumbville, TX is a bakery located in the Third Ward neighborhood of Houston, TX. It was founded by Ella Russell and sells E-dub-a-licious Treats: cookies, brownies, cupcakes, and “stuffed cups,” which are cupcakes with a cookie baked inside. In 2023, Crumbville was named #16 on Yelp’s Top 100 Restaurants. In 2022, its Chocolate Chip Pecan Cupcake was named the best cupcake in Texas by Yelp.

== History ==
=== E-dub-a-licious Treats ===
Founder Ella Russell began selling baked goods in 2008 throughout the community at hair salons, boutiques, and concerts. She would test recipes for her E-dub-a-licious Treats line with church attendees at the historic Eldorado Ballroom long before she was able to open a retail space inside of the building. She includes both vegan and gluten-free options among her offerings.

=== Crumbville ===
An early version of Crumbville opened as a temporary art installation inside of a row house at Project Row Houses in collaboration with artist Anthony Suber that ran from October 2015 to February 2016.

On October 8, 2016, Russell joined the Project Row Houses business incubation program and opened a shop on the first floor of the Eldorado Ballroom at 2316 Elgin Street. In 2021, Crumbville moved to its current home on Emancipation Avenue (formerly Dowling Street) at the site of the former speakeasy Delia's Lounge.
