= LeJeune's Bakery =

- U.S. National Register of Historic Places
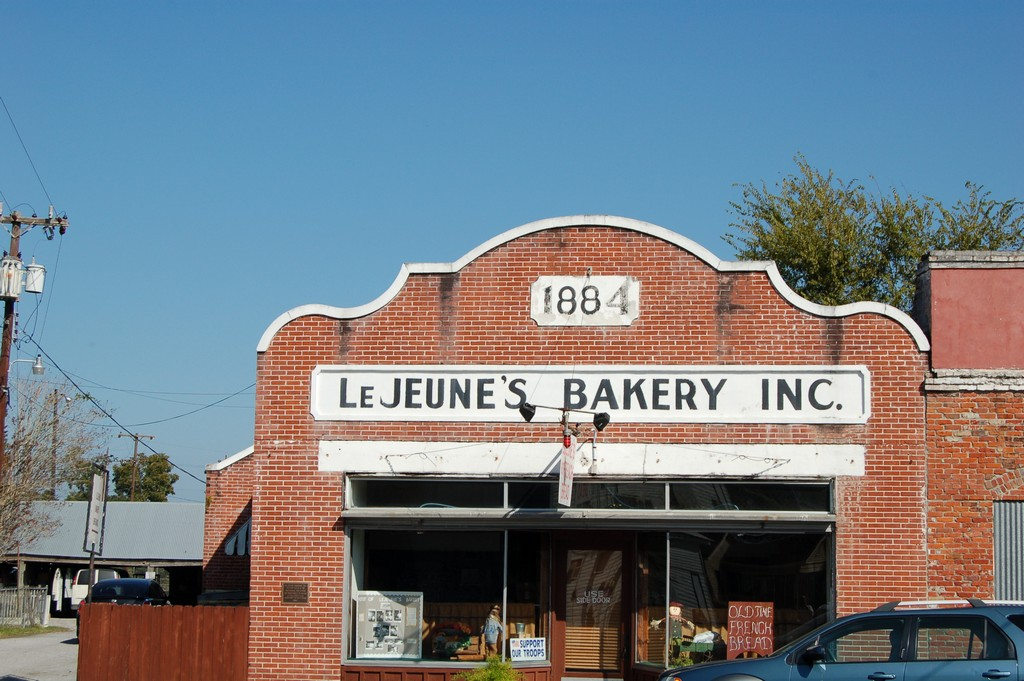

- Location within Louisiana Location within the United States
- Location: 1510 Main Street, Jeanerette, Louisiana
- Coordinates: 29°54′59″N 91°40′04″W
- Area: less than one acre
- Built: 1918
- NRHP reference No.: 03000287
- Added to NRHP: April 22, 2003

LeJeune's Bakery is a historic Louisiana bakery located and operating at 1510 Main Street, Jeanerette.

Opened in 1884 by Oscar J. LeJeune as the Old Reliable City Bakery, the building underwent a major remodelling in 1918, when O.A. LeJeune and Walter LeJeune, Sr. purchased the bakery from Oscar.

The building was renamed LeJeune's some time between 1918 and 1934., and added to the National Register of Historic Places on April 22, 2003.

== See also ==
- National Register of Historic Places listings in Iberia Parish, Louisiana
