= Krishna Pauroti =

Nepali bakery

- Native name: कृष्ण पाउराेटी
- Company type: Private
- Industry: Food
- Founded: 1948
- Founder: Krishna Bahadur Rajkarnikar
- Headquarters: Kamal Pokhari, Kathmandu, Nepal
- Number of locations: 6
- Area served: Kathmandu, Nepal
- Key people: Krishna Bahadur Rajkarnikar
- Products: Bread
- Number of employees: 100+ (2020)
- Website: https://www.krishnapauroti.com/

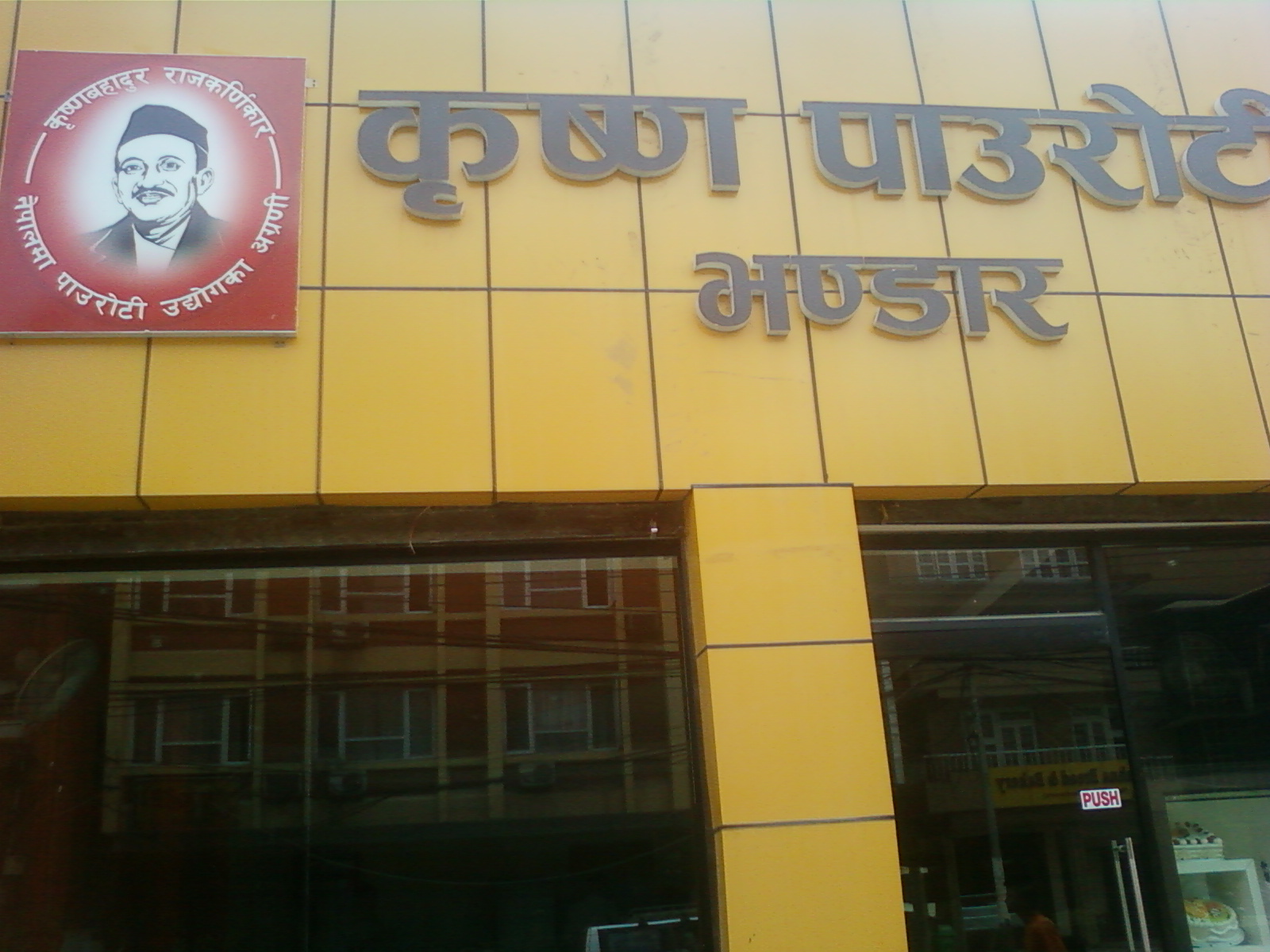
Where Krishna Pauroti originally started it is still in operation at the same place.

Krishna Pauroti is a Nepali bakery brand. It was founded in 1948 by Krishna Bahadur Rajkarnikar in Kamal Pokhari, Kathmandu, Nepal. Currently it operates from six locations within Kathmandu valley, i.e. Kamal Pokhari, Khusibhun, Khumaltar, Satdobato-tikabhairab road, Hatti Ban and Mahalaxmi. Kai Weise, a correspondent of The Himalayan Times, labelled Krishna Pauroti "the first bakery in Nepal". Certainly people must have been baking things in the country before that not necessarily as they are today. But when it comes to a commercial operation or establishment of baking profession no other businesses than Krishna Pauroti can be found recorded before it.

== History ==
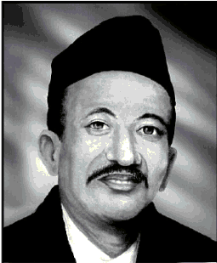
Krishna Bahadur Rajkarnikar established Krishna Pauroti, the first bakery in Nepal

After returning to Nepal from his foreign visit Krishna Bahadur Rajkarnikar thought of starting a business in his own country what he saw in the country he visited. Eventually establishing Krishna Pauroti in 1948. It had been a synonyms for breads and bakery in Nepal for long time ever since its beginning until establishment of other bakeries and matching its level of production.

== Product Verities ==
Along with usual bakery verities Krishna Pauroti bakes some typical Nepalese grain varieties, such as croissant made of millet, faper(Nepali:फापर) etc.
