= Lyndell's Bakery =

Bakery in Ball Square in Somerville, Massachusetts

Coordinates: 42°24′0.2″N 71°6′46.6″W

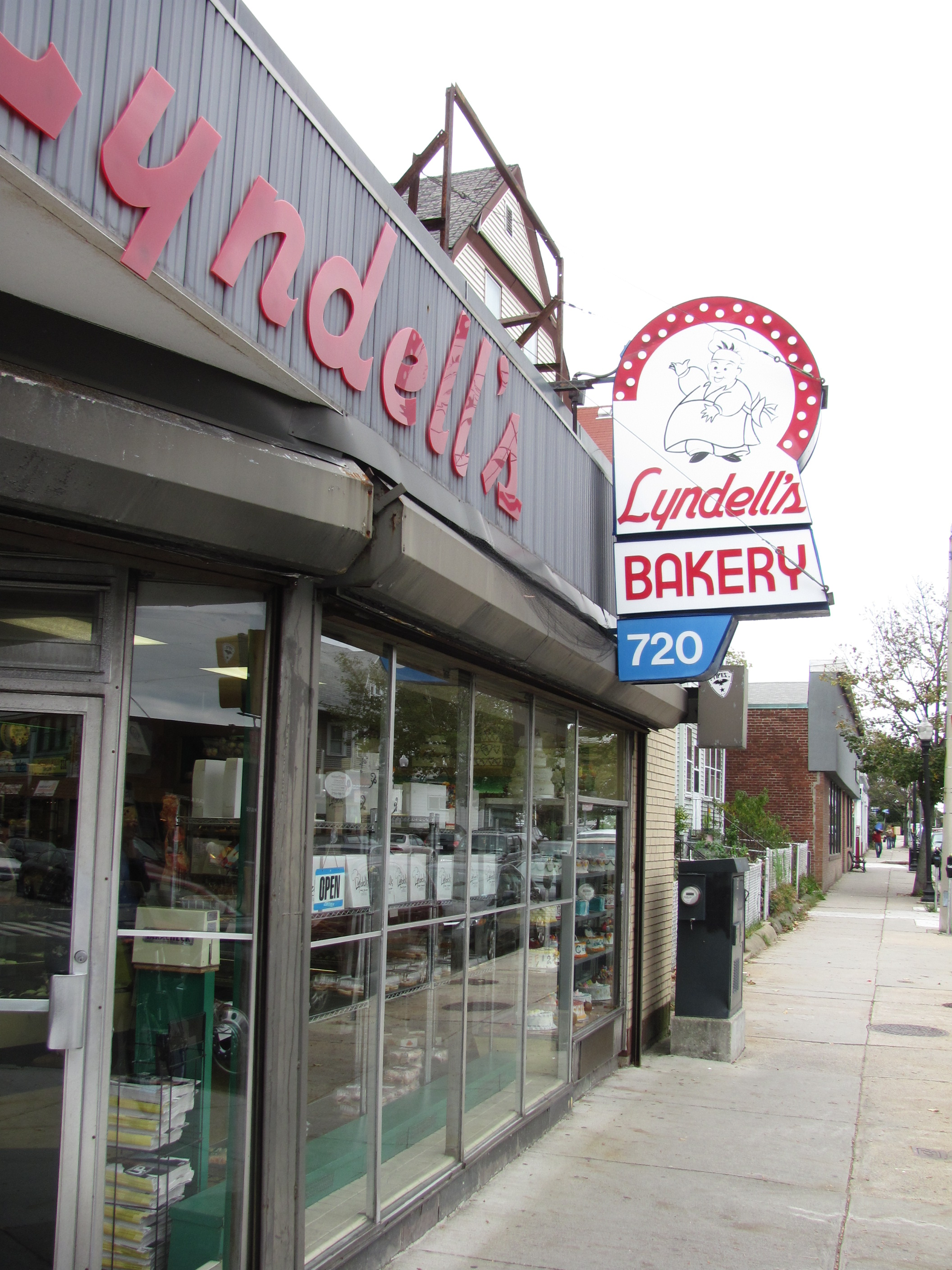
Lyndell's Bakery

Lyndell's Bakery is a bakery in Ball Square in Somerville, Massachusetts. In December 2007, it celebrated 120 years of operation. Lyndell's is a classic, full-service American bakery, a rare holdout in New England communities.

== Ownership history ==
Birger C. Lyndell, born in Sweden in 1866, moved to the United States in 1880, seven years before the founding of Lyndell's Bakery in 1887. He lived in Newton until 1901, when he moved to Somerville at an address a block away from the original location of Lyndell's Bakery. A 1940 Newton directory listed Lyndell as retired. The identity of the original owner was lost until uncovered by Bob Hallett, a genealogy buff, who read about the 120 year anniversary in The Boston Globe.

The bakery's second owner, Eugene Klemm, purchased the business in 1934 and brought a German influence to the recipes. Klemm sold it to Herman and Janet Kett in 1968. In 2000, Gary Bagarella and a partner, Bill Galatis, former executives with South Boston-based Watermark Donut Company, one of Dunkin' Donuts largest franchises, bought the bakery. Bagarella sold his stake in the business to Galatis in early 2000.

== Operations ==
Everything is baked from scratch each day, and daily leftovers are donated to the Little Sisters of the Poor. Lyndell's does a strong cake decorating business, and people who've left the area have been known to call from as far away as Georgia and ask for shipments of the bakery's honeycomb bread.

== Changes after 2000 ==
Although customers expressed concerns that there would be radical changes brought by the new owners after 2000, Bill Galatis learned quickly that it would be difficult and risky to make changes to the formula that had made Lyndell's a local institution. The store had stopped opening on Sundays during World War II due to rationing; Galatis changed that and Sunday became their best sales day. He also restored selling cream-filled pastries in the summer months. However, he preserved the classic recipes, custom-decorated sheet cakes, and retro storefront sign that have kept customers coming back.

The bakery has expanded its operations by opening additional locations in Cambridge, near Central Square (opened in 2010, closed in 2013), and in Boston's North End (opened in 2009, closed in 2011).
