= Saint Cupcake =

Bakery and dessert shop in Portland, Oregon, U.S.

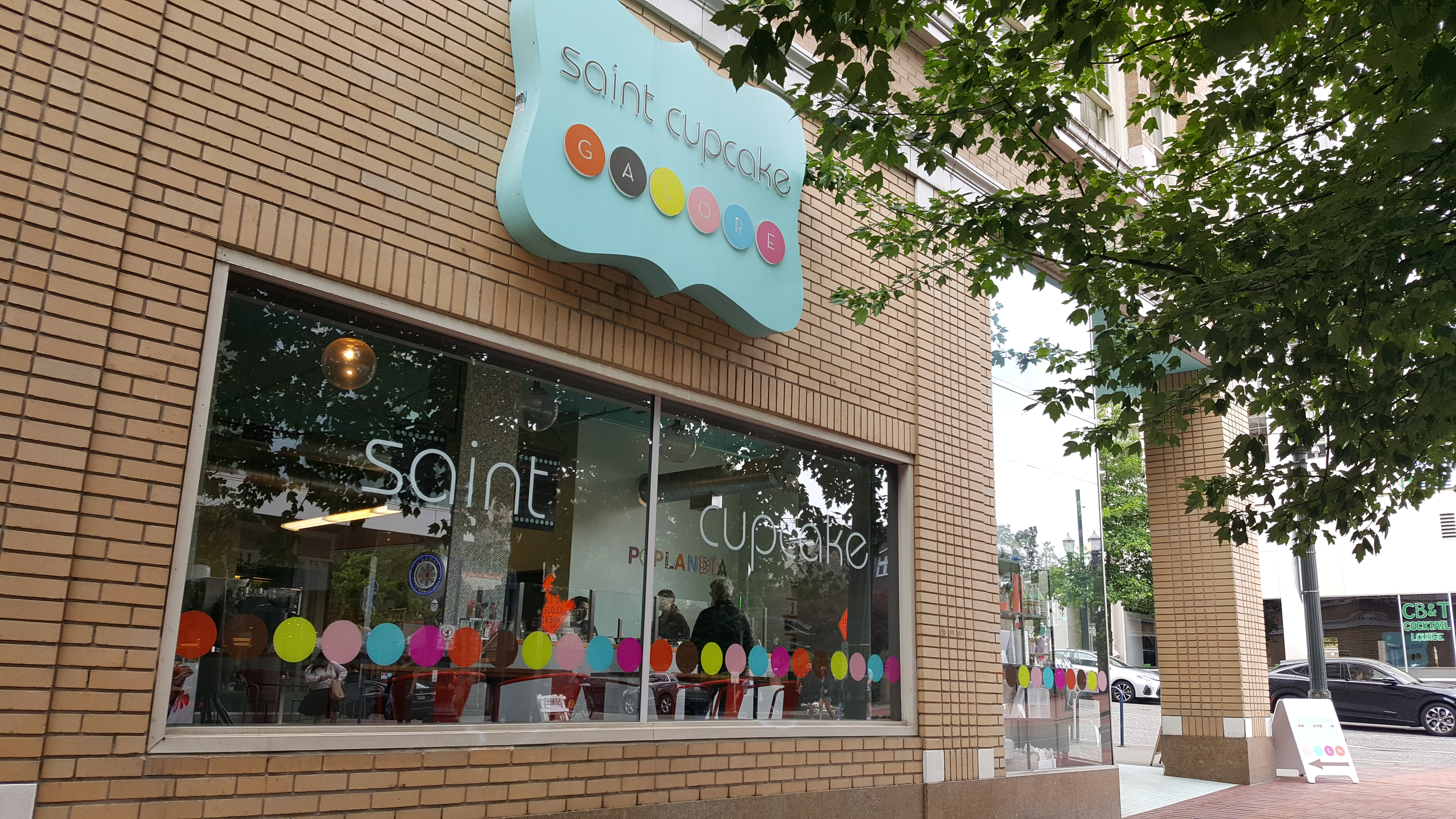
- Exterior of the shop in downtown Portland, Oregon, in 2022
- Interactive map of Saint Cupcake

Restaurant information
- Established: 2005
- Owners: Alex and Julie Bond
- Previous owner: Jami Curl
- Location: 1138 Southwest Morrison Street, Portland, Multnomah, Oregon, 97205, United States
- Coordinates: 45.5204°N 122.6840°W
- Website: saintcupcake.com

Saint Cupcake is a cupcake shop in Portland, Oregon, United States. Jami Curl opened the original shop in 2005.

== Description ==
The bakery and dessert shop Saint Cupcake operates in Portland, Oregon. It specializes in cupcakes but also offers cakes, cookies, ice cream, and pies. Cake and cupcake varieties have included banana-chocolate chip, chocolate with chocolate buttercream, coconut, hot fudge, pistachio, and red velvet. The Salty Captain is a chocolate cupcake with caramel buttercream and caramel sauce.

== History ==
Saint Cupcake opened in November 2005. The shop was burglarized in 2006.

In late 2013, owner Jami Curl announced plans to close both locations (1138 Southwest Morrison Street and 3300 Southeast Belmont Street) on December 31. The Morrison location was slated to become a Portland Creamery shop. The Belmont location became Sprinklefingers.

In May 2014, plans were announced for Saint Cupcake to reopen under new ownership. Alex and Julie Bond initially planned to open the Belmont location on May 29 and the Morrison location in June. The opening date for the Belmont location was later pushed back to June. The Morrison location opened on June 20.

In 2014, the Bonds announced plans to open two additional locations.

== Reception ==
In early 2014, prior to the announcement of the reopenings under new ownership, Anne Marie DiStefano of the Portland Tribune wrote, "The end of 2013 also was the end for the two Saint Cupcake shops. The red velvet cake with cream cheese frosting was a long-time favorite of mine, but all the cupcakes were distinguished by a uniquely delicate, springy texture that other cupcakeries struggle to achieve." Charlotte Druckman of The Wall Street Journal called Saint Cupcake "beloved" in 2014. In her book Portland Family Adventures, Jen Stevenson said Saint Cupcake "will elicit cries of cupcake joy".

In 2017, Oregon Public Broadcasting said Saint Cupcake was an "incredibly popular" bakery that "got rolling just as it seemed the entire country had gone crazy for the bite-size treats". Portland Monthly's Kelly Clarke said Saint Caupcake "nailed the cupcake trend". Rebekah Denn of The Seattle Times said business "became well-established as one of Portland's best stops" and wrote: "It was big, beloved and busy nonstop." In 2024, Brooke Jackson-Glidden and other writers for Eater Portland said, "Saint Cupcake has been a go-to for cupcakes since the mid-2000s cupcake mania."

== See also ==
- List of bakeries
