= Sprinkles Cupcakes =

Cupcake bakery chain

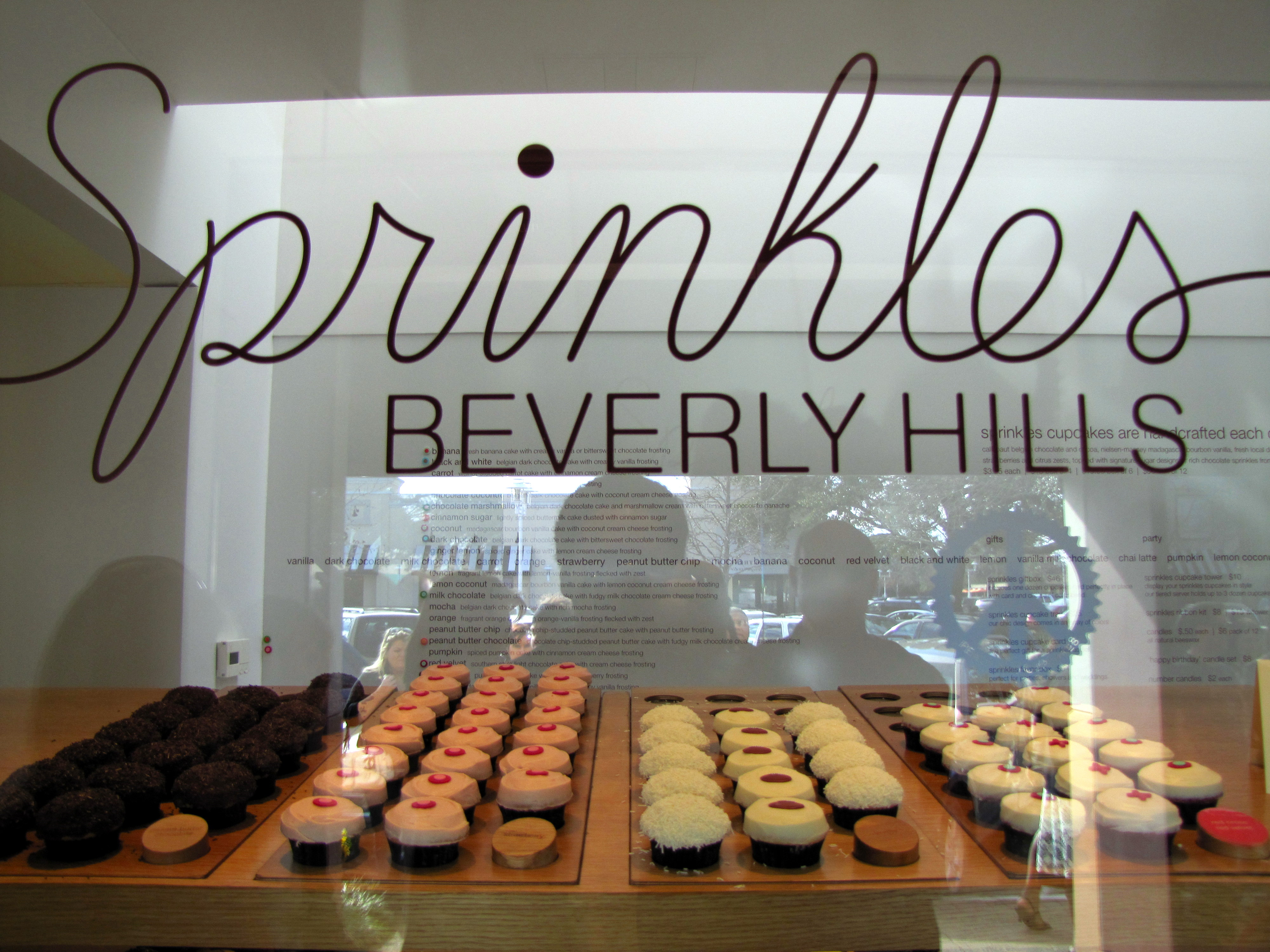
- Type: Private
- Industry: Bakery
- Founded: April 13, 2005
- Founders: Candace Nelson, Charles Nelson
- Defunct: December 31, 2025; 9 months ago
- Fate: Closed
- Headquarters: Austin, Texas, United States
- Products: Cupcakes; Cakes; Cookies; Chocolates
- Website: sprinkles.com

Sprinkles Cupcakes was a nationwide cupcake bakery chain established in 2005 and closed in 2025.

== History ==
After attending Tante Marie's Pastry Program in San Francisco, former investment banker Candace Nelson decided to create a bakery devoted solely to cupcakes. On April 13, 2005, she and her husband opened the first Sprinkles store in Beverly Hills, California.

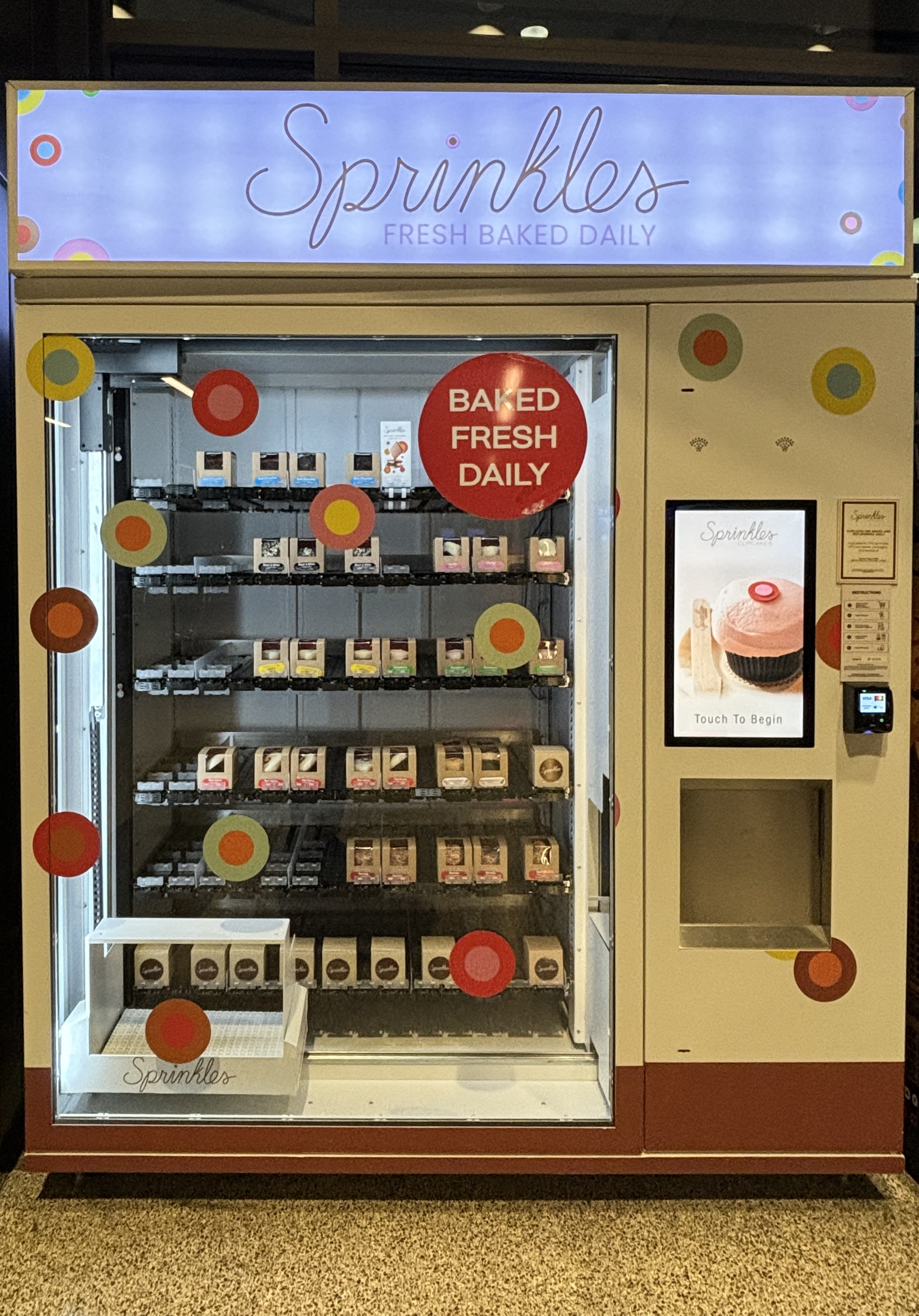
A Sprinkles Cupcake ATM at Austin–Bergstrom International Airport, 2024

Sprinkles eventually expanded nationwide, with locations at the time of the company's closure in Arizona, California, Washington, D.C., Florida, Nevada, Texas and Utah, including 21 traditional stores and 25 "Cupcake ATMs." The Cupcake ATMs were vending machines that dispensed cupcakes on demand 24 hours a day.

Nelson sold Sprinkles to a private equity group in 2012.

On December 31, 2025, Sprinkles abruptly announced the immediate closure of all of its locations nationwide.

2 stores in Northern California (San Ramon and Palo Alto) are still open as independent local stores.
