= Baked & Wired =

Bakery and cafe in Washington, D.C.

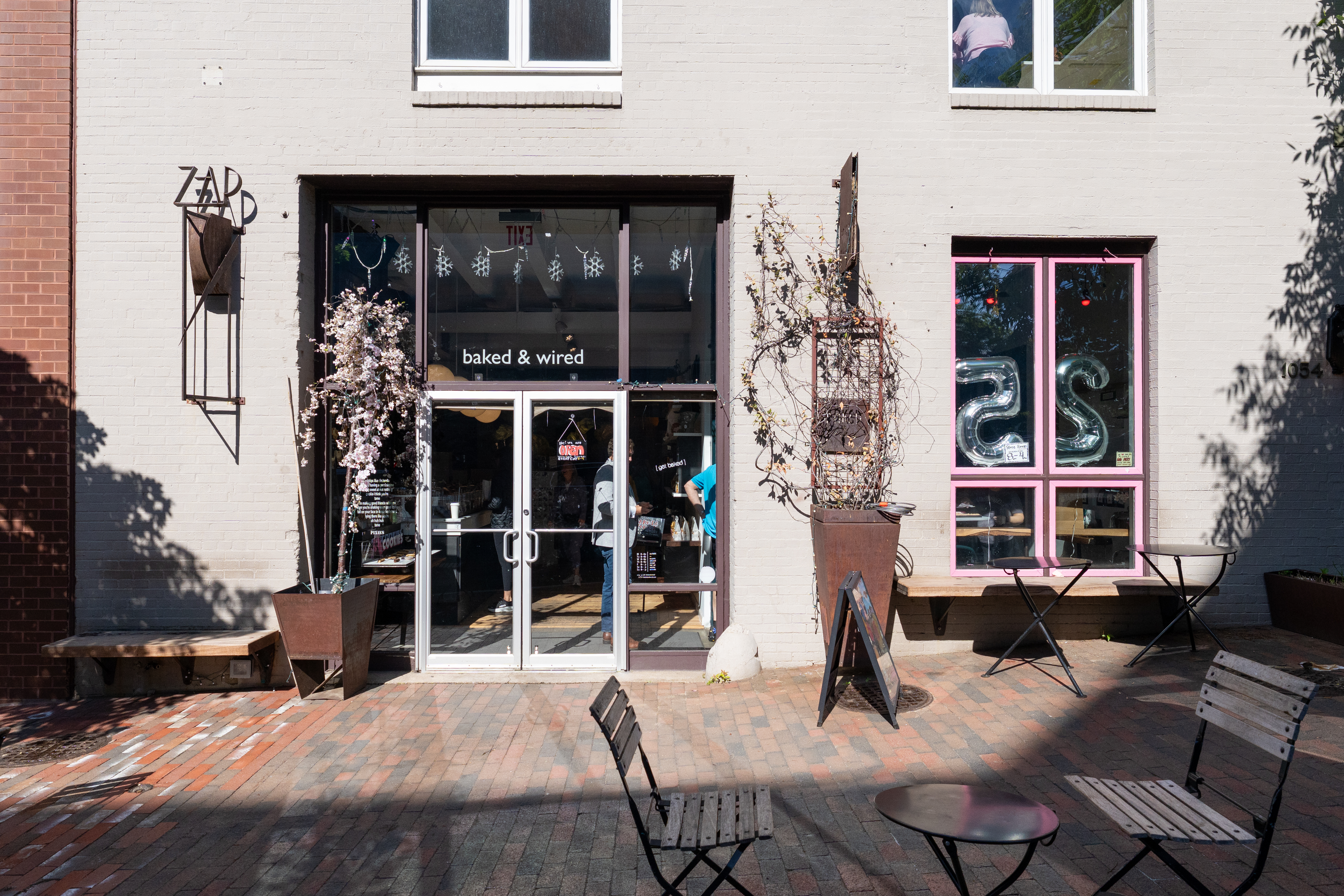
- Baked & Wired's Georgetown location
- Interactive map of Baked & Wired

Restaurant information
- Established: 2001
- Owners: Tony & Teresa Velazquez
- Food type: Bakery, coffeehouse
- Location: 1052 Thomas Jefferson St NW, Washington D.C., 20007, United States
- Coordinates: 38.90402°N 77.06032°W
- Website: bakedandwired.com

Baked & Wired is a bakery and coffeehouse in the Georgetown neighborhood of Washington, D.C. It was opened in 2001 by Teresa Velazquez (co-owned with her husband Tony Velazquez) and specializes in baking cupcakes but also offers a wider range of other baked goods including cookies, quiches and brownies. Velazquez did not intend to open a cupcake shop, but the demand for the baked good eclipsed the other offerings.

Many locals consider Baked & Wired more of an "insider" choice, especially for those who live in Georgetown, whereas Georgetown Cupcake is more of a tourist phenomenon.

== A Baked Joint ==
In 2015, the Velazquezes opened A Baked Joint in the Mount Vernon Triangle neighborhood, without their cupcakes but with coffee and "intriguing homemade breads", according to Lori McCue in The Washington Post.
