= Tante Marie =

Cookery school in Woking, Surrey, England

Coordinates: 51.3193°N 0.5581°W

Tante Marie Culinary Academy is a cookery school in Woking, Surrey, England. It is the United Kingdom's oldest independent cookery school, established in 1954 by the cookery writer Iris Syrett.

It was the first school in the UK to offer a Cordon Bleu Diploma (though the Tante Marie Cordon Bleu diploma is its own independent qualification and the Academy is not part of the 'Le Cordon Bleu' international network). The diploma forms the backbone of Tante Marie's courses, which range in length from one day workshops in particular areas of cooking to the full-time, one-year professional Cordon Bleu Diploma which is awarded along with the Level 4 Diploma in Professional Culinary Arts, a formally accredited qualification, created by Tante Marie Culinary Academy with the Confederation of Tourism and Hospitality in 2010.

The Academy also has a restaurant staffed by graduates, who are studying for a Level 5 Diploma in Culinary and Hospitality Management whilst working in 'The Restaurant at Tante Marie'.

Iris Syrett died in 1964, after which Wendy Majerowicz became Principal. In 1967 the school moved to Woodham House, Carlton Road. John and Beryl Childs, who owned the school from 1982 to 1999, continued the development of courses and curriculum into a programme that has become recognised as one of the world's leading independent providers of culinary training.

Marcella O'Donovan, one of the school's teachers, bought the school with the backing of her family in 1999. The O'Donovans oversaw the introduction of new courses to cater for the gap year and the amateur cook market, while at the same time maintaining the school's professional emphasis.

In April 2008, the school was bought by its then Deputy Principal, Andrew Maxwel with Gordon Ramsay Holdings and Lyndy Redding, a former graduate of the Intensive Cordon Bleu Diploma course who now owns Absolute Taste, a catering and events planning business based in London.

In May 2014 it was announced the school would be moving to a site in Woking town centre. The new base opened in the refurbished Alexander House, Commercial Way, in early 2015. Two floors of the building house the cookery school, with training theatre kitchen, student kitchens and lectures rooms.
