= DC Cupcakes =

American reality television series

- Genre: Reality
- Starring: Katherine Kallinis-Berman; Sophie Kallinis-LaMontagne
- Country of origin: United States
- Original language: English
- No. of seasons: 3
- No. of episodes: 28

Production
- Executive producers: Dan Cesareo; Doug DePriest; Jacquie Dincauze; Mark Finkelpearl; Mike Kane; Terence Noonan
- Running time: 20 to 23 minutes
- Production company: Big Fish Entertainment

Original release
- Network: TLC
- Release: July 16, 2010 – July 1, 2013

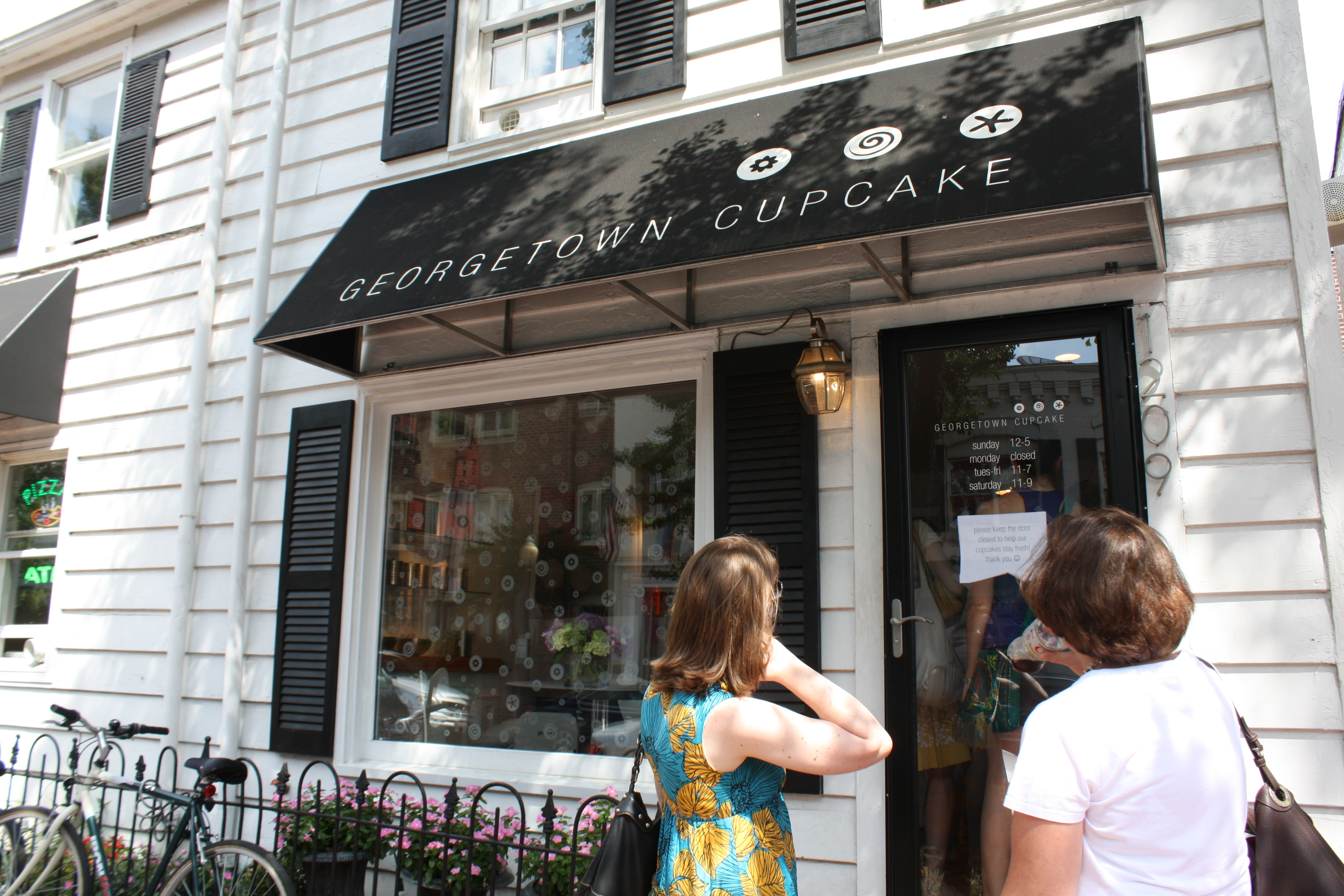
Georgetown Cupcake's original Potomac Street location

DC Cupcakes is an American reality television series that follows sisters and business partners Sophie LaMontagne and Katherine Kallinis (later Berman) as they run Georgetown Cupcake, a small cupcakery located in Washington, D.C. The series premiered on TLC on July 16, 2010.

== Episodes ==
=== Series overview ===
Season	Episodes	Originally released	
Season	Episodes	First released	Last released
1	6	July 16, 2010	July 30, 2010
2	12	February 25, 2011	April 8, 2011
3	10	November 11, 2011	July 1, 2013

=== Season 1 (2010) ===
No. overall	No. in season	Title	Original release date
1	1	"Mardi Gras"	July 16, 2010
2	2	"Roller Girls"	July 16, 2010
3	3	"Pupcakes"	July 23, 2010
4	4	"Wedding Recipe"	July 23, 2010
5	5	"Greek Festival"	July 23, 2010
6	6	"Fire House"	July 30, 2010

=== Season 2 (2011) ===
No. overall	No. in season	Title	Original release date
7	1	"Sweet"	February 25, 2011
8	2	"Gorilla Birthday"	February 25, 2011
9	3	"Shoe-in"	March 4, 2011
10	4	"Operation Cupcake"	March 4, 2011
11	5	"Cupcake Jackpot"	March 11, 2011
12	6	"Happy Anniversary"	March 11, 2011
13	7	"Fashion Victims"	March 18, 2011
14	8	"Think Pink"	March 25, 2011
15	9	"So You Think You Can Lion Dance?"	April 1, 2011
16	10	"Cookie College with"	April 1, 2011
17	11	"Tattoo Twosome"	April 8, 2011
18	12	"Katherine's Surprise"	April 8, 2011

=== Season 3 (2011–2013) ===
No. overall	No. in season	Title	Original release date
19	1	"My Sweet Wedding"	November 11, 2011
20	2	"Nutcracker Sweets"	December 2, 2011
21	3	"One Ton Cupcake"	January 16, 2012
22	4	"Mommy's Birthday Surprise!"	May 4, 2012
23	5	"Takes New York"	June 8, 2012
24	6	"Wicked Good Showdown"	October 9, 2012
25	7	"County Fair"	February 14, 2013
26	8	"Baby Special"	March 12, 2013
27	9	"Get Tanked"	June 14, 2013
28	10	"Coney Island Challenge"	July 1, 2013
