= Candace Nelson =

American pastry chef (born 1974)

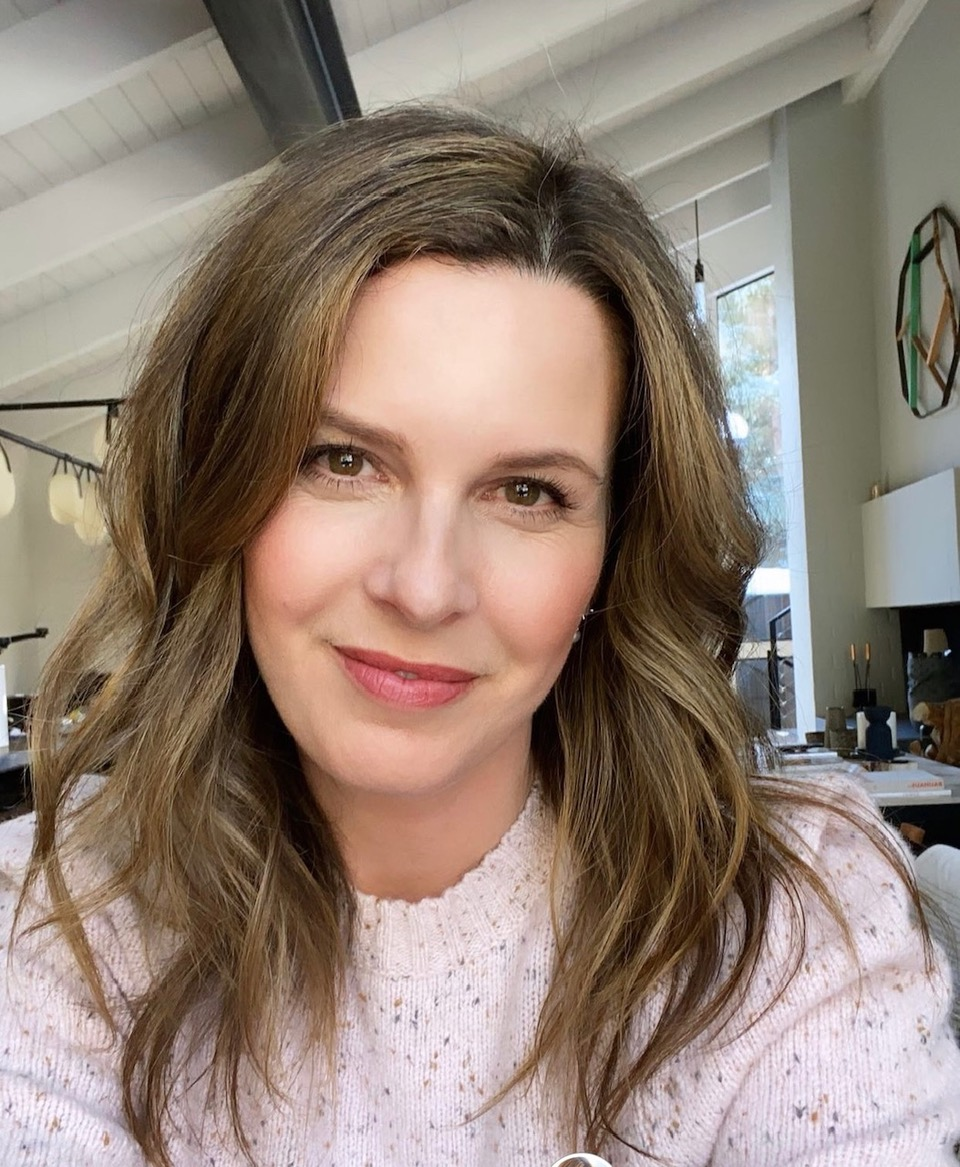
- Nelson in 2022
- Born: May 8, 1974 (age 52); Jakarta, Indonesia
- Education: Wesleyan University
- Occupations: Businesswoman, pastry chef, television personality
- Website: candace-nelson.com

Candace Nelson (born May 8, 1974) is an Indonesian-born American pastry chef and judge on the television series Cupcake Wars and Sugar Rush.

== Early life ==
Nelson was born on May 8, 1974, in Indonesia. Baking runs in her family, as her French-American grandmother was known for the desserts she created at her San Francisco restaurant in the 1930s. Nelson is a graduate of Groton School (class of 1991), Wesleyan University (class of 1996), and Tante Marie's Professional Pastry Program in San Francisco. Nelson is a Wesleyan Distinguished Alumnus Award recipient.

Before entering the bakery business, Nelson and her husband, Charles (born 1969), a native of Oklahoma, worked as investment bankers. After the dot-com bust, Nelson decided to focus on pastry making and opened a custom cake business from her home in San Francisco. Later she and Charles moved the business to a former old-fashioned sandwich shop in Los Angeles and began making only cupcakes.

== Sprinkles Cupcakes ==
On April 13, 2005, the couple opened Sprinkles Cupcakes, the world's first cupcake bakery. They started in a 600-square-foot (56 m^{2})-shop in Beverly Hills, California. Though the bakery business was in a four-year no-carb slump and early naysayers, they sold 2,000 cupcakes the first week. Nelson is described as having a "sophisticated" take on the classic cupcake, using high-quality ingredients like sweet cream butter, pure Nielsen-Massey Madagascar Bourbon vanilla, and Callebaut chocolate. She also created offbeat offerings like vegan and gluten-free cupcakes and even cupcakes for dogs. The sleek, minimalistic store was designed by an architect from Vienna and the logo and packaging were created by a former Martha Stewart employee.

Sprinkles eventually expanded to 22 locations throughout the United States including New York, with plans to open in 4 more cities including London and Tokyo. The Nelsons also started a traveling "Sprinklesmobile", a Mercedes Sprinter van designed by Sprinkles architect Andrea Lenardin. In 2007, Nelson also developed a line of cupcake mixes which are sold exclusively through her store and Williams Sonoma stores in the United States and Canada. In 2012, Sprinkles introduced its Cupcake ATM, a contactless cupcake delivery system, which Nelson conceived after a late-night pregnancy craving. Sprinkles expanded 38 Cupcake ATMs nationwide. Sprinkles fans included Oprah Winfrey, Blake Lively, Katie Holmes, Ryan Seacrest, Tom Cruise, Barbra Streisand, and Serena Williams.

In 2012, Nelson sold Sprinkles to a private equity group. Thirteen years later, on December 31, 2025, all Sprinkles locations were permanently closed.

== Television career ==
Nelson is a judge on the competition series Cupcake Wars, syndicated around the world, and Sugar Rush, which she executive produced. She appeared on five episodes of Shark Tank, three as a Guest Shark where she made a deal with Gently Soap, Flaus and Fishwife. She has also appeared on The Best Thing I Ever Ate, The Chef Show, and has been a judge on Bobby Flay's Throwdown and Top Chef Junior. Nelson also has been featured on television shows, including Today, Nightline, The Martha Stewart Show, The Kelly Clarkson Show, Masterchef Season 10 and profiled in People and Vanity Fair. Her cupcakes have been featured by The Oprah Winfrey Show, Bon Appetit magazine, Food & Wine, The New York Times and the Los Angeles Times. She served as a judge on Next Level Baker in 2025.

Nelson co-created and is executive producer of the pizza cooking competition Best in Dough on Hulu.

== Pizzana ==
Nelson is co-founder of Pizzana, a Michelin Bib Gourmand award winning Neo-Neapolitan pizza restaurant chain with locations in Southern California and Texas. Pizzana won a Nation's Restaurant News' Hot Concept Award and Nelson was featured on the cover of the magazine.

== Writing ==
Nelson is the author of The New York Times Best Seller The Sprinkles Baking Book and The Wall Street Journal Best Seller Sweet Success. She is a contributor to The Wall Street Journal and Inc.

== Personal life ==
Nelson resides in Los Angeles, California, and Sun Valley, Idaho. Her Sun Valley home was featured on Elle Decor. She has two sons.
