= Georgetown Cupcake =

Bakery in Georgetown, Washington, D.C.

Coordinates: 38.905247°N 77.066192°W

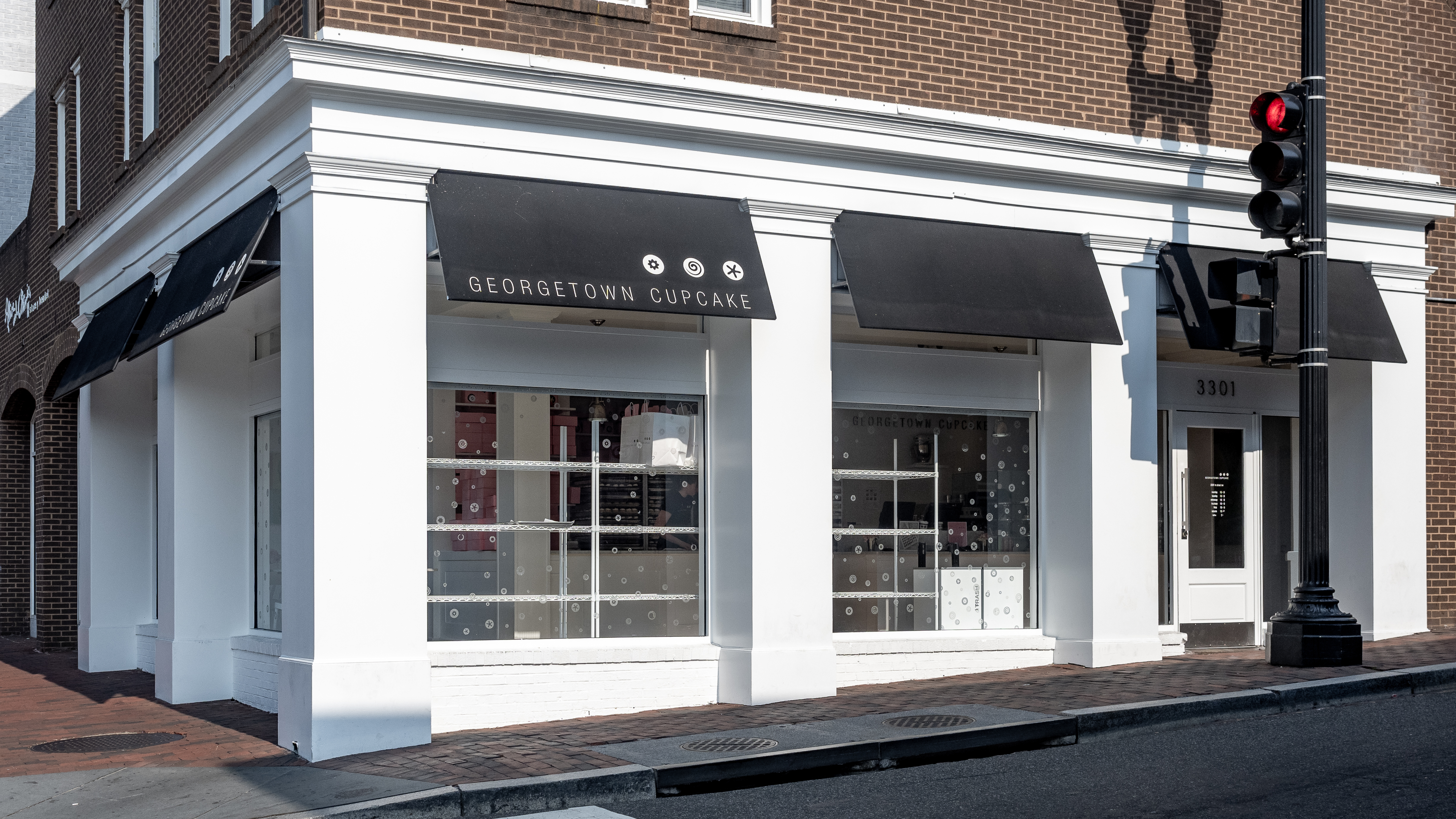
- Store on M Street (2024)
- Founded: February 14, 2008; 18 years ago in Georgetown, Washington, D.C., United States
- Founders: Katherine Berman; Sophie LaMontagne
- Website: www.georgetowncupcake.com

Georgetown Cupcake is a cupcakery based in the Georgetown neighborhood of Washington, D.C. Sisters Katherine Berman (née Kallinis) and Sophie LaMontagne (née Kallinis) opened the shop in February 2008.

== History ==
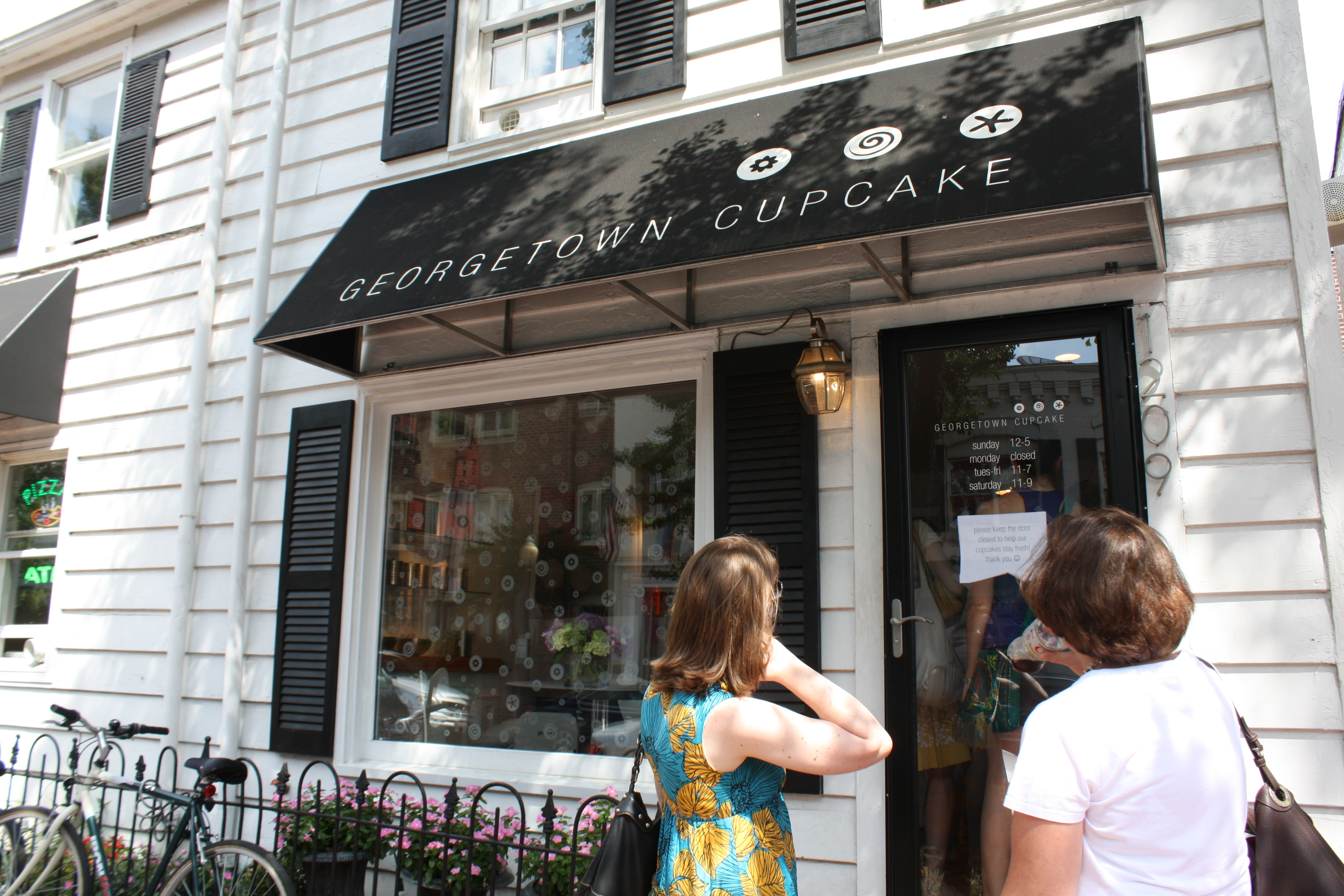
Georgetown Cupcake's original Potomac Street location, now used by the company for storage.

Growing up in Toronto, Katherine Berman and Sophie LaMontagne learned baking from their Greek grandmother. When they were children, their grandmother allowed them to use leftover cake batter to make miniature cakes, such as cupcakes.

Before opening the shop, LaMontagne was working in Boston for a venture capital firm, and Berman worked for Gucci in Toronto. Berman, a graduate of Marymount University and familiar with the Washington, D.C. area, decided it would be a good place to open a cupcake shop. The sisters financed the shop using their own life savings, along with a small business loan. Their mother and employee, Elaine Kallinis, also helps run the shop.

Berman and LaMontagne opened the shop in Georgetown in February 2008, in a small, white-framed house on Potomac Street. The shop quickly became popular, often running out of cupcakes during the day and then closing up shop until the following day.

By December 2009, Georgetown Cupcake outgrew the location and moved the shop to a new location at the corner of 33rd and M Street NW in Georgetown. Georgetown Cupcake has opened a second location in Bethesda, Maryland, and sells cupcakes online that ship nationwide. They opened stores in New York City, Boston, Los Angeles, and Atlanta. However, all locations outside of the DMV area were closed. The shop maintains the Potomac Street location for filling mail and special orders, as well as hosting special events such as cupcake decorating parties. The majority of shipping orders and large projects, however, are filled at their shipping annex located in Sterling, Virginia. On weekends at the M Street location, lines extend out the door and around the corner. Customers consist equally of both tourists and locals.

== Cupcakes ==
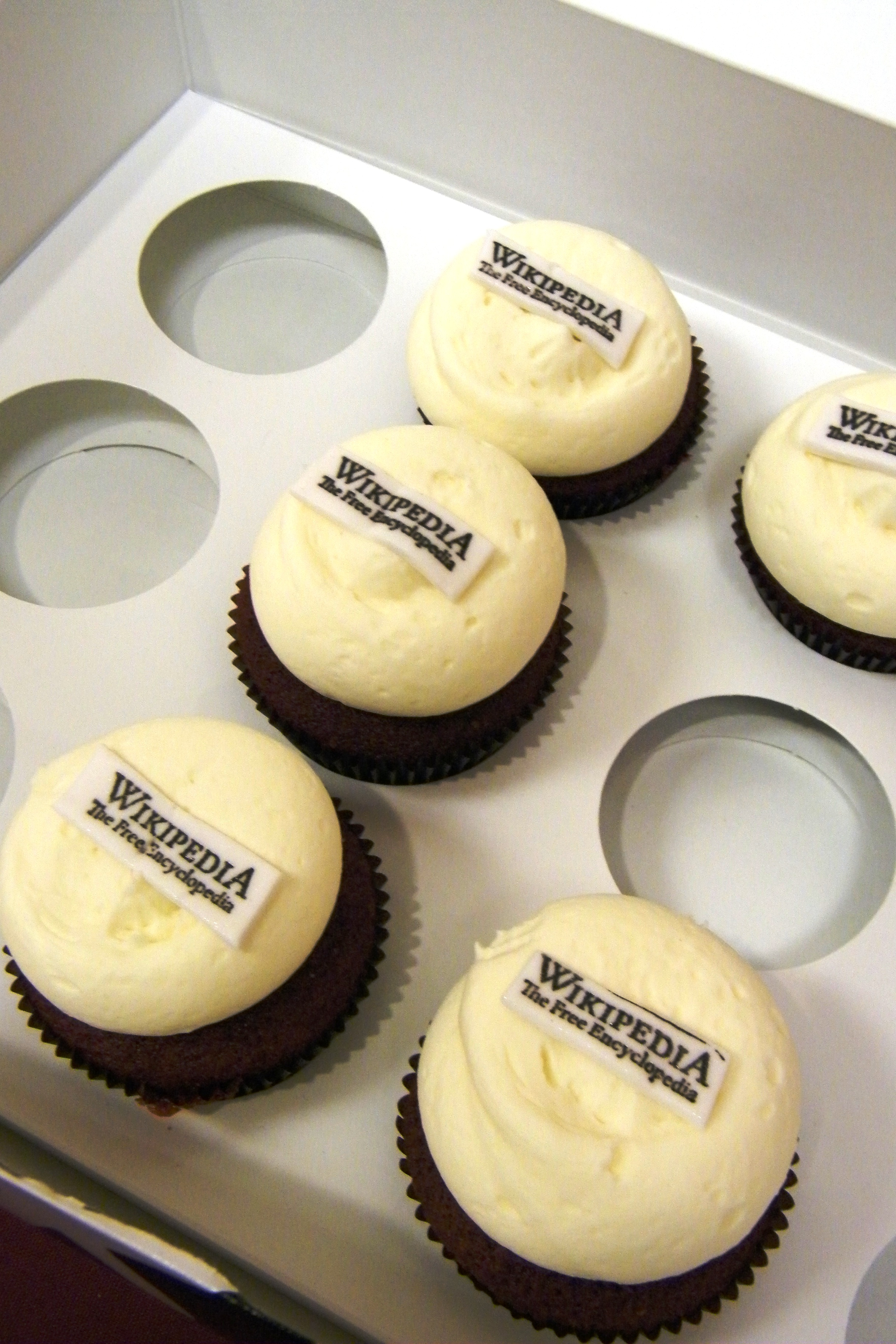
Georgetown Cupcakes for Wikipedia

Georgetown Cupcake offers over thirty flavors each day, including multiple varieties of chocolate, vanilla, and red velvet, several seasonal flavors, and other flavors on rotation throughout the week. The cupcakes are baked throughout the day at the shop, and use specially-sourced ingredients such as cocoa from France and vanilla from Madagascar. Each cupcake has roughly 250 calories, except for those with less frosting such as the Chocolate Ganache variety which have approximately 200 calories.

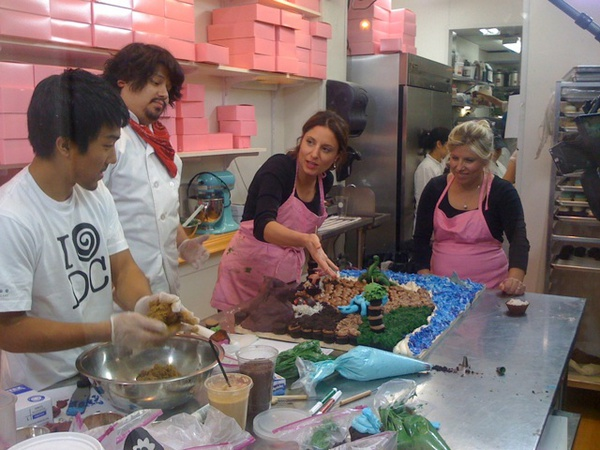
Owners and sisters Katherine Berman and Sophie LaMontagne preparing a special order, a dinosaur-themed cake (250 mini-cupcakes), at their shop.

The shop sells an average of 10,000 cupcakes daily, with red velvet being the top-seller. Each day, Georgetown Cupcake gives away 100 free cupcakes at each location; they announce the free, not-on-the-menu flavor on their Facebook and Twitter pages, and give them out to the first 100 customers who request them.

== Television ==
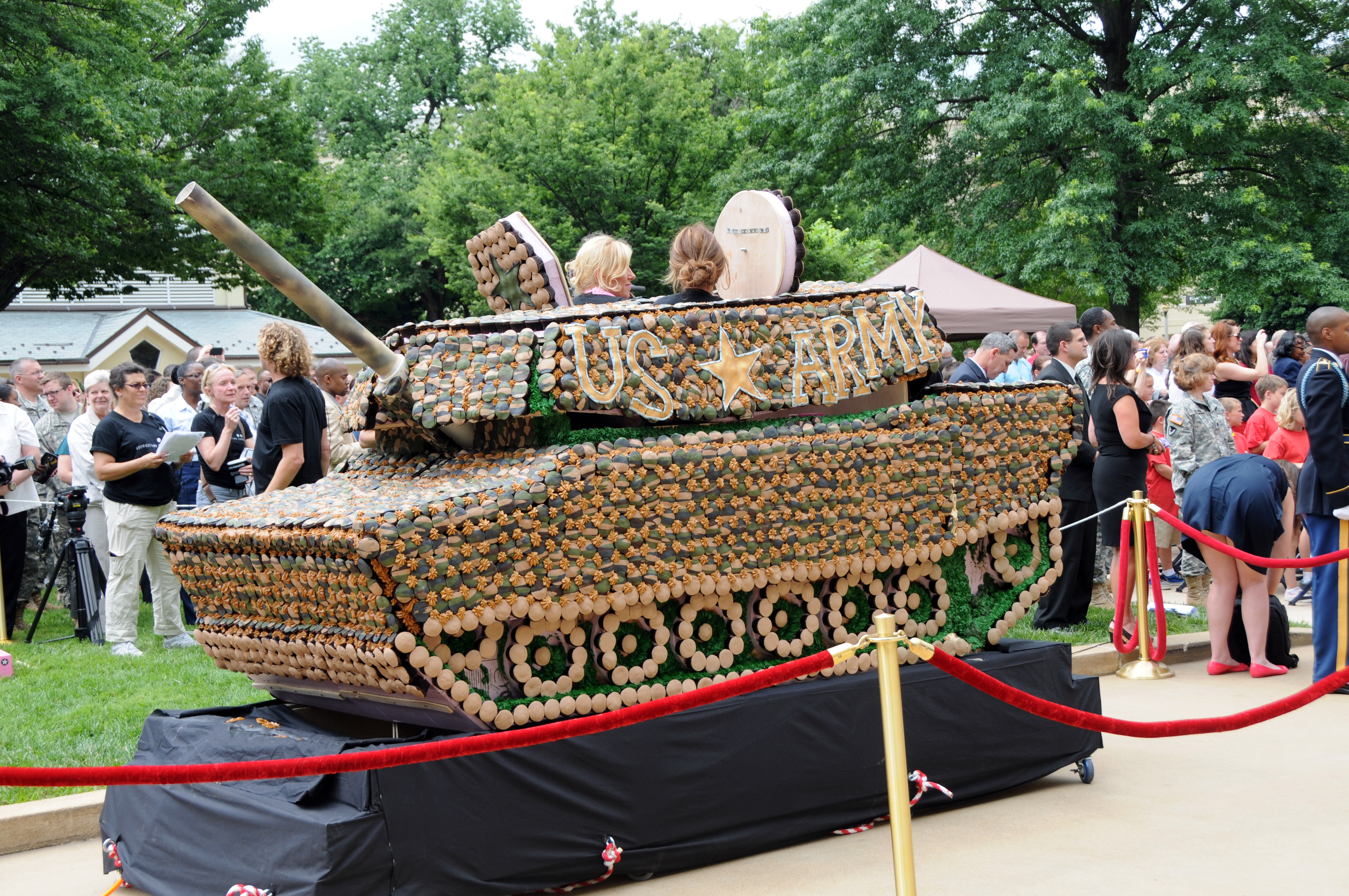
A cupcake tank constructed by Georgetown Cupcake for a birthday celebration of the United States Army. The tank is made of over 5,000 cupcakes and weighs 2,500 pounds (1,100 kg).

During winter and spring of 2010, TLC filmed a reality series at Georgetown Cupcake, shadowing the sisters, telling their story, and aspects of running a small business. The six-part series, titled DC Cupcakes, aired on Fridays in July 2010. The second season began on Friday, February 25, 2011.

Berman and LaMontagne have appeared as guests on numerous other television shows, including the Martha Stewart Show, The Rachael Ray show, and NBC's Today Show. Due to the popularity of the first series of the show the sisters opened a new shop in Bethesda, Maryland, and as a result of the second series they opened up four additional locations in New York, Boston, Los Angeles, and Atlanta.

== See also ==
- Baked & Wired
- DC Cupcakes
