= Livengood =

Livengood may refer to:

- Livengood (surname)
- Livengood, Alaska, a census-designated place in Yukon-Koyukuk Census Area, Alaska, United States
  - Livengood mine, a gold mine
