= Insomnia Cookies =

American global bakery chain

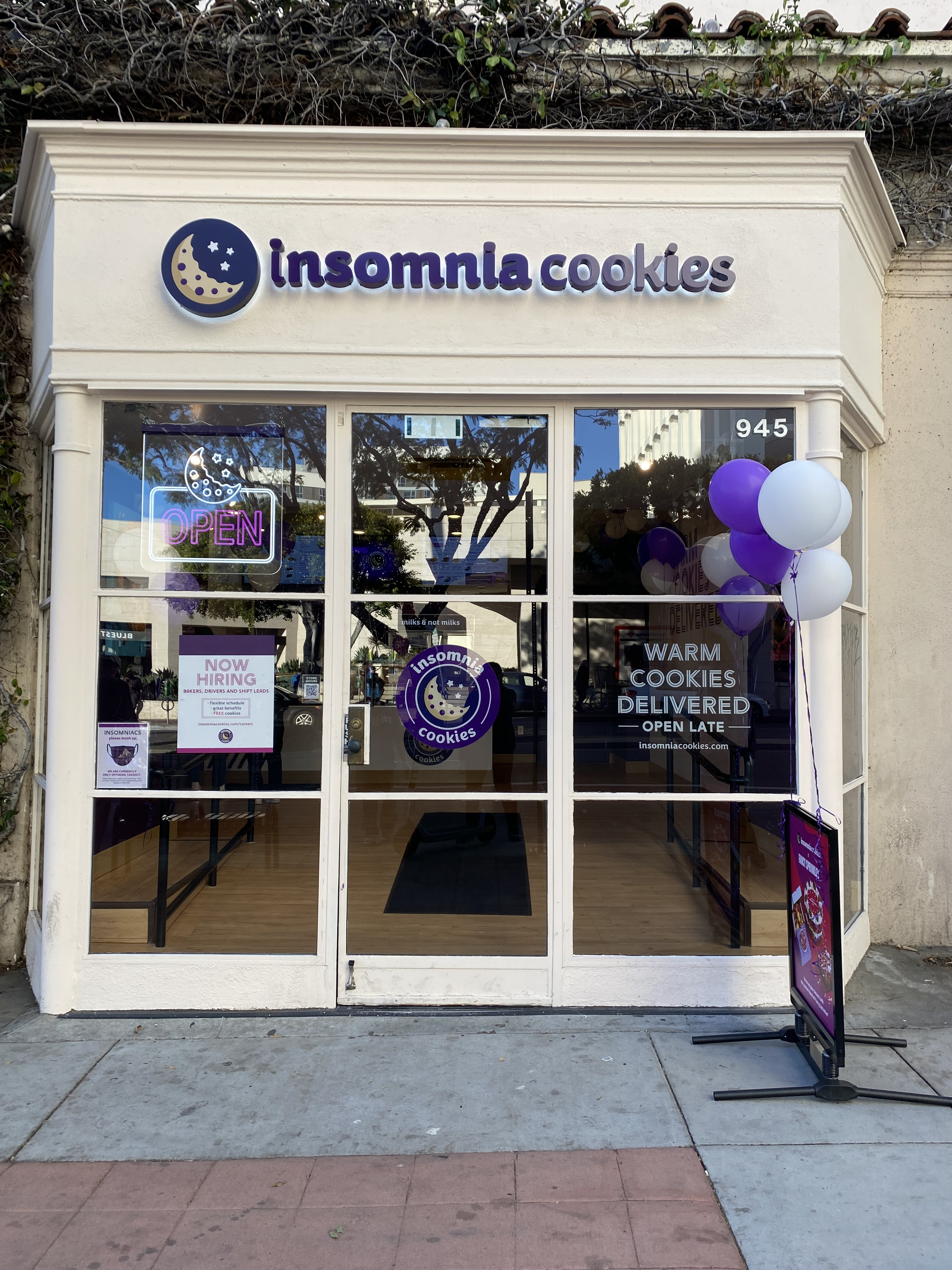
- Insomnia Cookies on UCLA's campus
- Type: Private
- Industry: Bakery
- Founded: 2003 in Philadelphia, Pennsylvania, U.S.
- Founder: Seth Berkowitz
- Headquarters: Philadelphia, Pennsylvania & New York, New York
- Number of locations: 265+ stores (2024)
- Area served: United States
- Owner: Verlinvest; Mistral Equity Partners
- Website: insomniacookies.com

Insomnia Cookies is a chain of bakeries primarily in the United States that specializes in delivering warm cookies, baked goods, and ice cream. Based in New York and Philadelphia, it was started in 2003 by Seth Berkowitz, a student at the University of Pennsylvania. The company has more than 265 stores, mainly located throughout the continental U.S., with international locations in Canada and England. Many stores are located in close proximity to university campuses and cater to students who want to order cookies late at night.

== History and operations ==
The company was founded by Seth Berkowitz in 2003 while attending the University of Pennsylvania in Philadelphia. Berkowitz began baking and delivering cookies from a dorm room to students on campus late at night. From there the concept of cookie delivery grew. The first retail store opened in 2003 on the Penn campus. The company has since expanded throughout the continental U.S., opening its 100th store in 2016.

Insomnia Cookies is based in New York City and Philadelphia. Stores are typically located near college and university campuses to target students who wish to order cookies past the closing time of traditional bakeries. Most are open from 10:00 a.m. until 3:00 a.m. Monday-Friday, and from noon until 3:00 a.m. on weekends.

In 2018 Krispy Kreme, financed by JAB Holding Company, acquired Insomnia Cookies at a $175 million enterprise value; the company continued to operate independently.

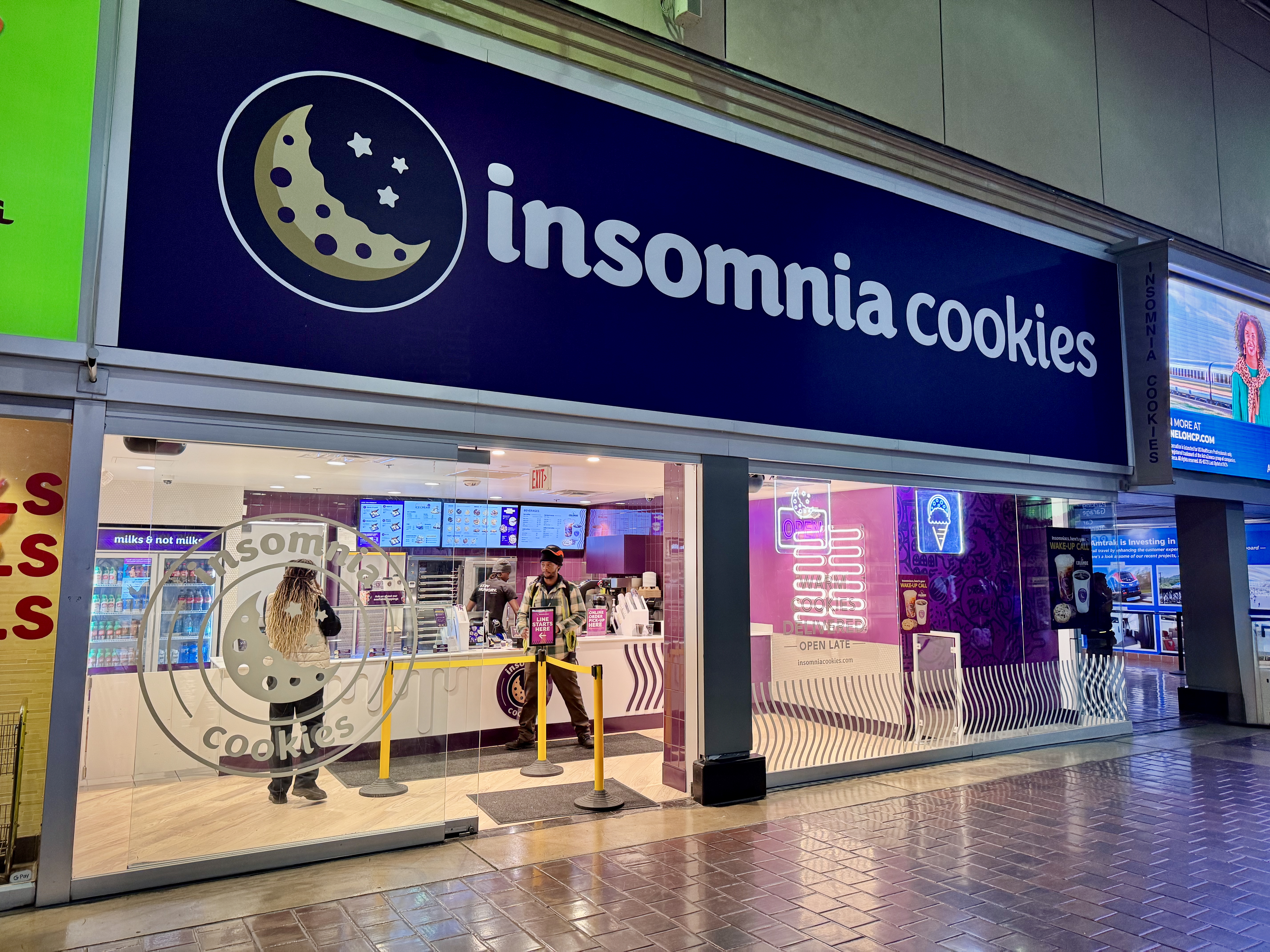
Insomnia Cookies, Washington Union Station

In April 2021, the company opened its first store with an experimental "CookieLab" section, a "cookie speakeasy" that offers customizable cookies and a bar with milk and milkshake options, in South Philadelphia.

In June 2021, the company opened its 200th store in Exton, Pennsylvania.

In April 2023, a class-action lawsuit filed against Insomnia Cookies alleged that the company stole wages and tips from at least 40 minimum-wage workers. One worker claimed that a general manager allegedly called her "sneaky" and a "snake" for calling out the wage theft. The manager allegedly "scolded her for crying after she slipped and fell in the snow" and "put plastic spiders in her delivery bag", according to the lawsuit.

In October 2023, the company partnered with Universal Pictures and Scott Cawthon Productions to release the 'Freddy Fazbear's Cookie Pizza' in promotion of the Five Nights at Freddy's movie.

In 2023 the company expanded to locations outside of the United States, with the first international bakeries in Manchester, England and Toronto, Canada. More stores were opened in 2024 in Ontario, and the company reached more than 265 locations in North America.

In 2024, Krispy Kreme sold a majority stake in Insomnia Cookies—at a $350 million enterprise value—to Verlinvest and Mistral Equity Partners. Krispy Kreme sold their remaining stake in 2025 for an additional $75 million.

== Products ==
Insomnia Cookies sells 17 types of classic cookies, including vegan options, and a variety of deluxe cookies. Other products include cookie cakes, brownies, milk, ice cream, and ice cream sandwiches.
