= Lowrider Cookie Company =

Bakery based in the U.S. state of Washington

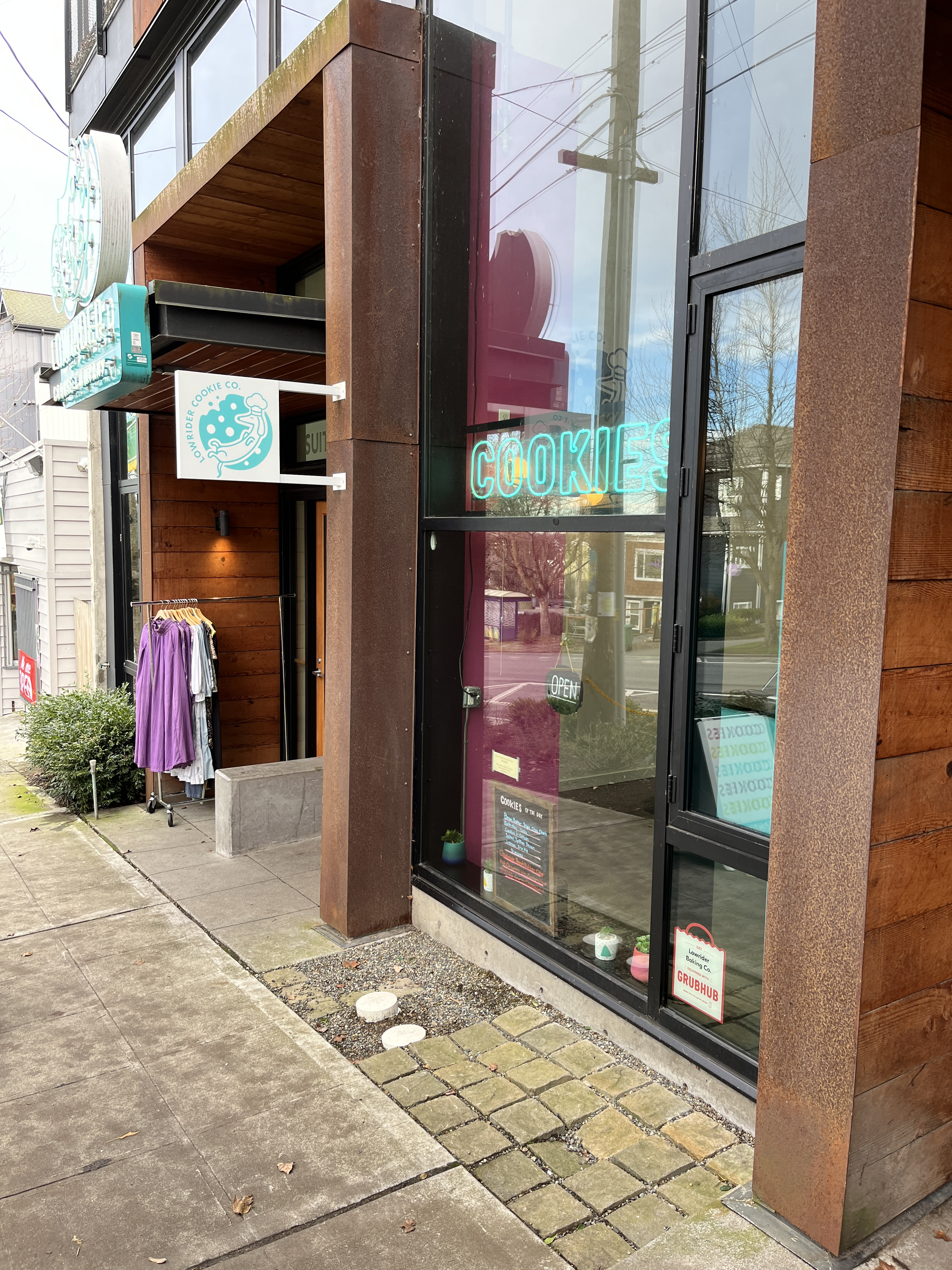
- Exterior of the shop in Seattle's Central District in 2023

Restaurant information
- Owner: Emily Allport
- Location: Washington, United States

Lowrider Cookie Company (LCC) is a bakery based in the Seattle metropolitan area, in the U.S. state of Washington. The woman-owned business is headquartered in Burien and has a brick and mortar shop in Seattle's Central District. It has also operated at Seattle–Tacoma International Airport in SeaTac. LCC specializes in cookies and cookie cakes.

== Description ==
The bakery Lowrider Cookie Company (LCC) operates in the Seattle metropolitan area. The woman-owned business is headquartered in Burien and operates a brick and mortar shop at the intersection of Union Street and 23rd Avenue in Seattle's Central District. Previously, the business operated a trailer in Georgetown. LCC's logo depicts a dachshund.

LCC specializes in cookies and cookie cakes. Cookie varieties have included birthday cake (white chocolate with sprinkles), brown butter triple chocolate chunk, lemon crinkle, salted toffee pecan, and s'mores. LCC also offers seasonal options.

== History ==
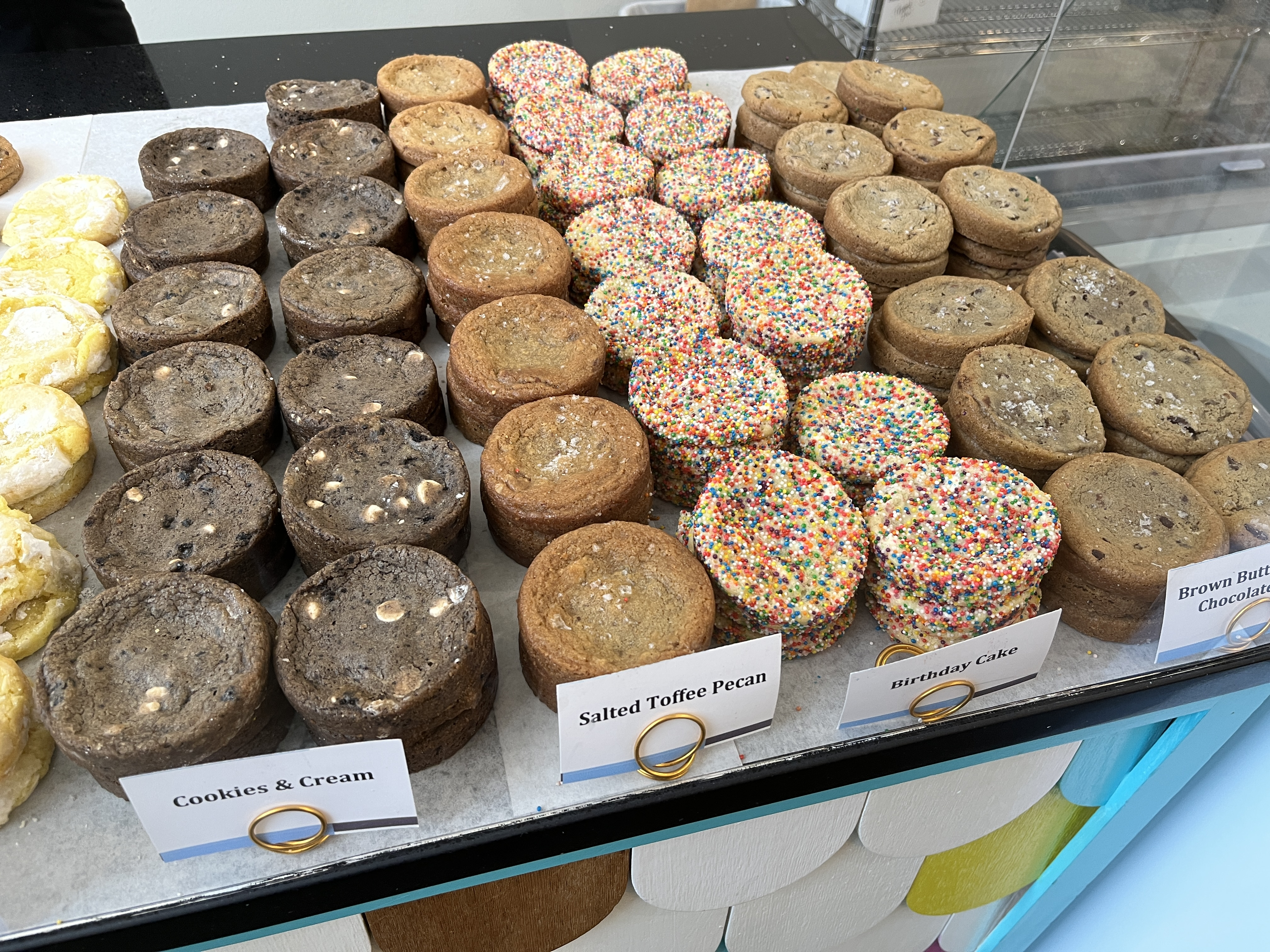
Cookie varieties

Emily Allport is the founder and owner. The business started as a pop-up at farmers' markets. LCC operated from the Georgetown Trailer Park Mall, starting in 2018. A permanent brick and mortar shop opened in the Central District in 2019. The business closed temporarily more than once in 2021 as a result of heatwaves.

In 2022, LCC opened a new location in Burien, which also serves as the headquarters. The business has also operated at Seattle–Tacoma International Airport. The Georgetown location closed in 2025.

== Reception ==
Chelsea Lin included LCC in Seattle Magazine's 2018 overviews of the city's "best" and "tastiest" cookies. Allie Lebos and Simon Feisthauer Fournet selected LCC to represent Washington in Tasting Table's 2025 list of the best chocolate chip cookies in each U.S. state. Kurt Suchman included the business in Eater Seattle's 2025 overview of the city's best cookies.

== See also ==
- List of bakeries
- List of restaurant chains in the United States
