= Pizza Haven =

Pizza Haven is the name of two unrelated, now defunct fast food chain restaurants:

- Pizza Haven (United States)
- Pizza Haven (Australia)
