= Krispy Kreme =

US-based doughnut company and coffeehouse chain

Krispy Kreme, Inc.

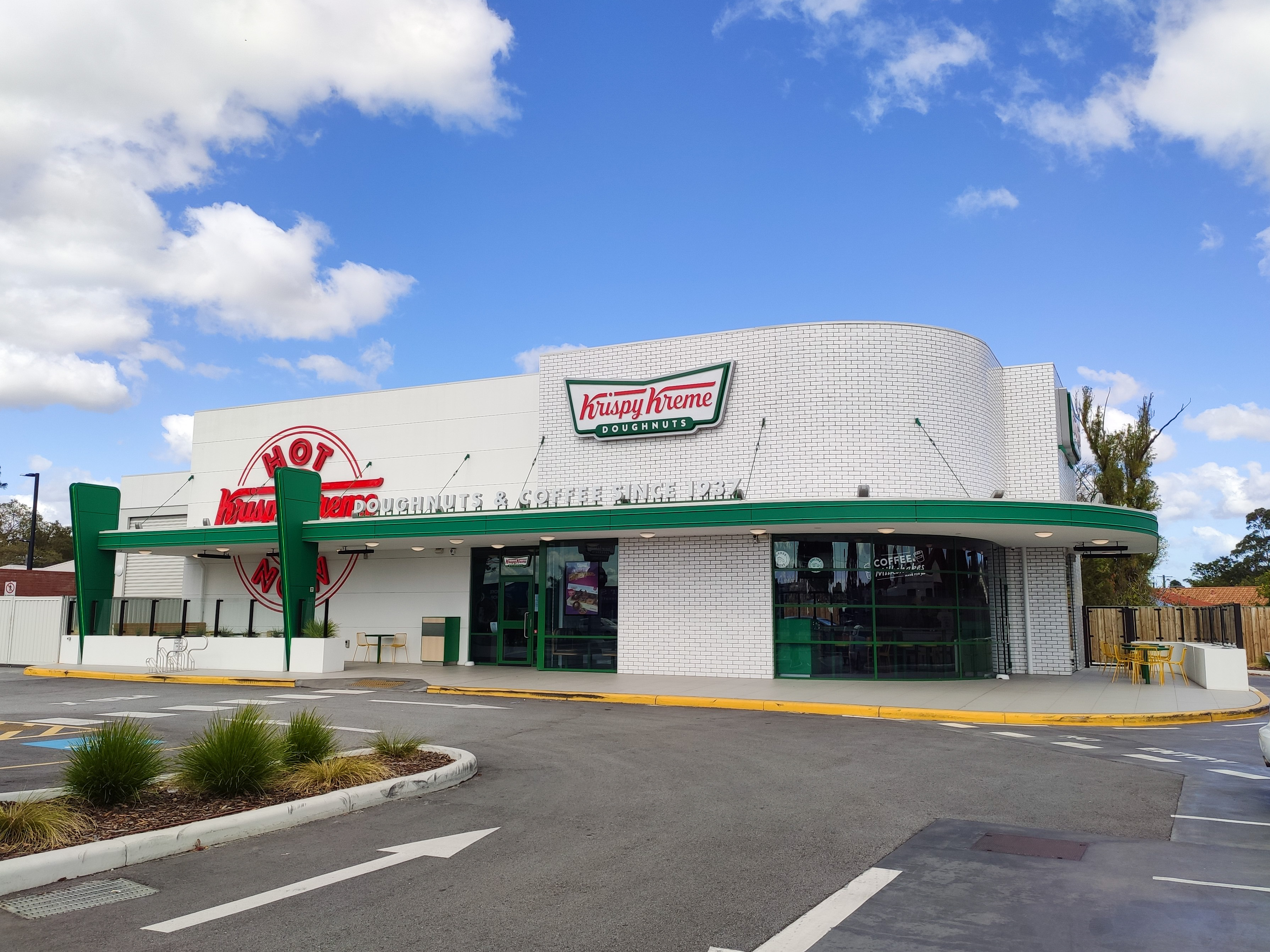
- Krispy Kreme in Cannington, Western Australia
- Trade name: Krispy Kreme
- Type: Public
- Traded as: Nasdaq: DNUT; Russell 2000 component
- Industry: Restaurant
- Founded: July 13, 1937; 89 years ago
- Founder: Vernon Rudolph
- Headquarters: Charlotte, North Carolina, U.S.
- Number of locations: 1,400
- Area served: Worldwide
- Products: Baked goods; Frozen beverages; Hot beverages; Iced beverages; Soft drinks
- Revenue: ▼US$1.627 billion (2023)
- Operating income: ▼ −US$8.725 million (2024)
- Net income: ▼US$3.095 million (2024)
- Total assets: ▼US$3.072 billion (2024)
- Total equity: ▼US$1.164 billion (2024)
- Number of employees: 21,000 (December 29, 2024)
- Website: krispykreme.com

Krispy Kreme, Inc. (previously Krispy Kreme Doughnuts, Inc.) is an American multinational doughnut company and coffeehouse chain. Krispy Kreme was founded by Vernon Rudolph (1915–1973), who bought a yeast-raised recipe from a New Orleans chef, rented a building in 1937 in what is now historic Old Salem in Winston-Salem, North Carolina, and began selling to local grocery stores. Steady growth preceded an ambitious expansion as a public company in the period 2000 to 2016, which ultimately proved unprofitable. In 2016, the company returned to private ownership under JAB Holding Company, a private Luxembourg-based firm. In July 2021, Krispy Kreme became publicly traded again on the Nasdaq. The brand name is a deliberate non-standard spelling of "crispy cream", for marketing effect.

== History ==
=== Early years ===
The original logo of Krispy Kreme Doughnuts. It is still used alternatively.

Plaque in Winston-Salem, North Carolina, that commemorates the first Krispy Kreme

In 1933, eighteen-year-old Vernon Rudolph, along with his brother Lewis Rudolph, began working for his uncle, Ishmael Armstrong, who owned a small general store in Paducah, Kentucky, that sold a wide variety of goods, including its very popular doughnuts. While the exact origin of the doughnut recipe remains partially a mystery, it is believed that Ishmael Armstrong was inspired by an Ohio River barge cook named Joseph LeBeouf who was famous for his light and fluffy doughnuts, which contained potatoes.

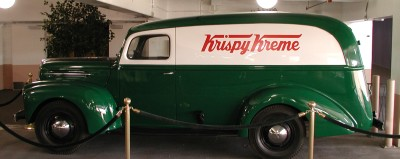
Krispy Kreme delivery truck, c. 1939

The store struggled during the Great Depression. In 1934, Vernon and Ishmael decided to move to the larger city of Nashville, Tennessee, where they hoped business would be better. The uncle and nephew focused solely on selling their doughnuts and opened "The Krispy Kreme Doughnut Company" in a rented store on Gallatin Road. The shop did so well that Vernon's father, Plumie, also left Kentucky and moved to Nashville to help sell doughnuts. In 1937, Rudolph opened his own store, deciding on Winston-Salem, North Carolina, for the location when he learned that his favorite cigarette company, Camel Cigarettes, was headquartered in the small North Carolina city. Rudolph primarily sold to convenience stores; however, he also sold hot doughnuts to individual customers who came during production time between midnight and 4 a.m. The first store in North Carolina was located in a rented building at 534 South Main Street in Winston-Salem in what is now called historic Old Salem. The Krispy Kreme logo was designed by Benny Dinkins, a local architect. The first Krispy Kreme bakery outside the South opened in Akron, Ohio, in 1939.

=== Growth ===
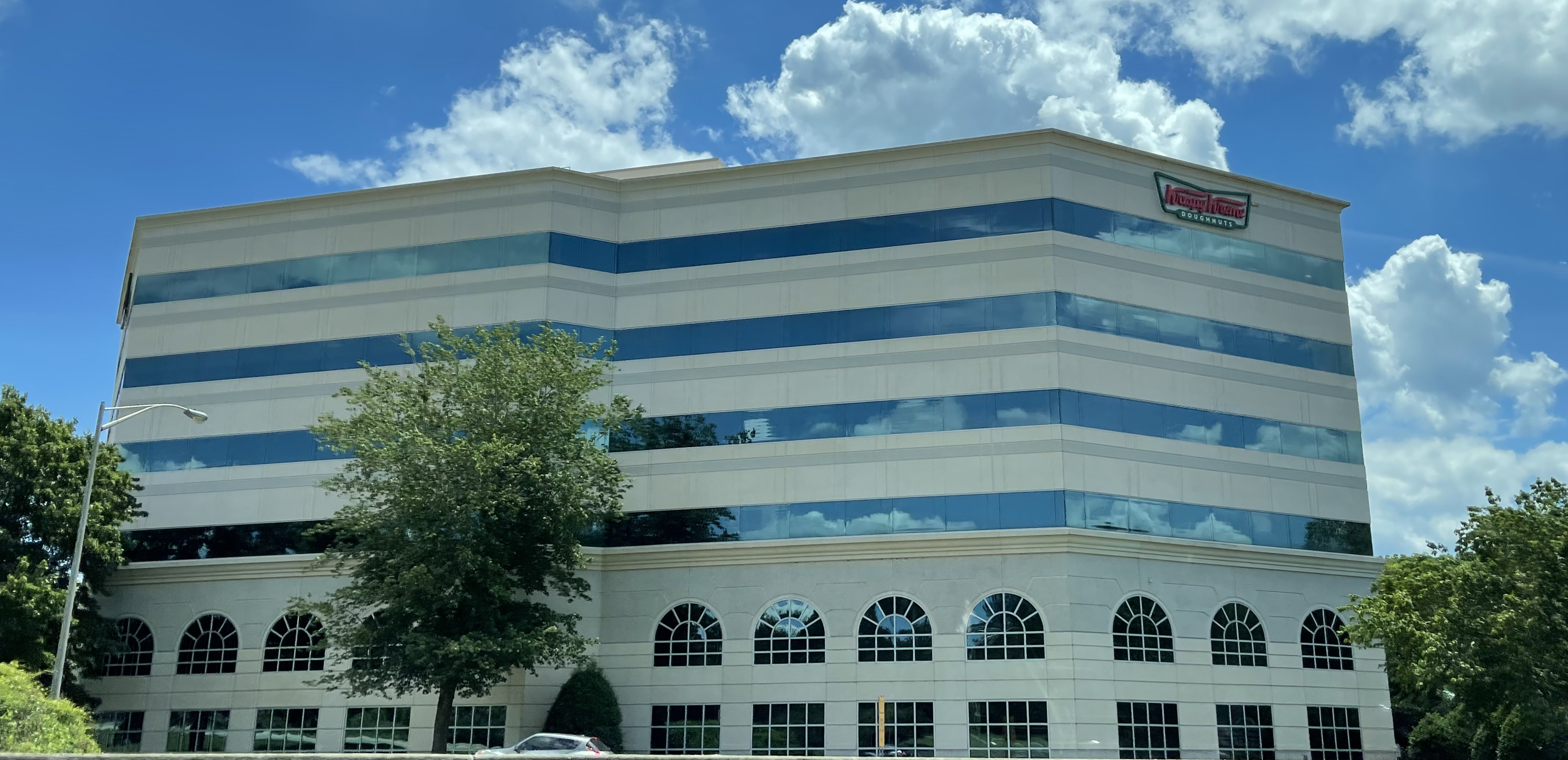
Krispy Kreme's former corporate headquarters in Winston-Salem, North Carolina

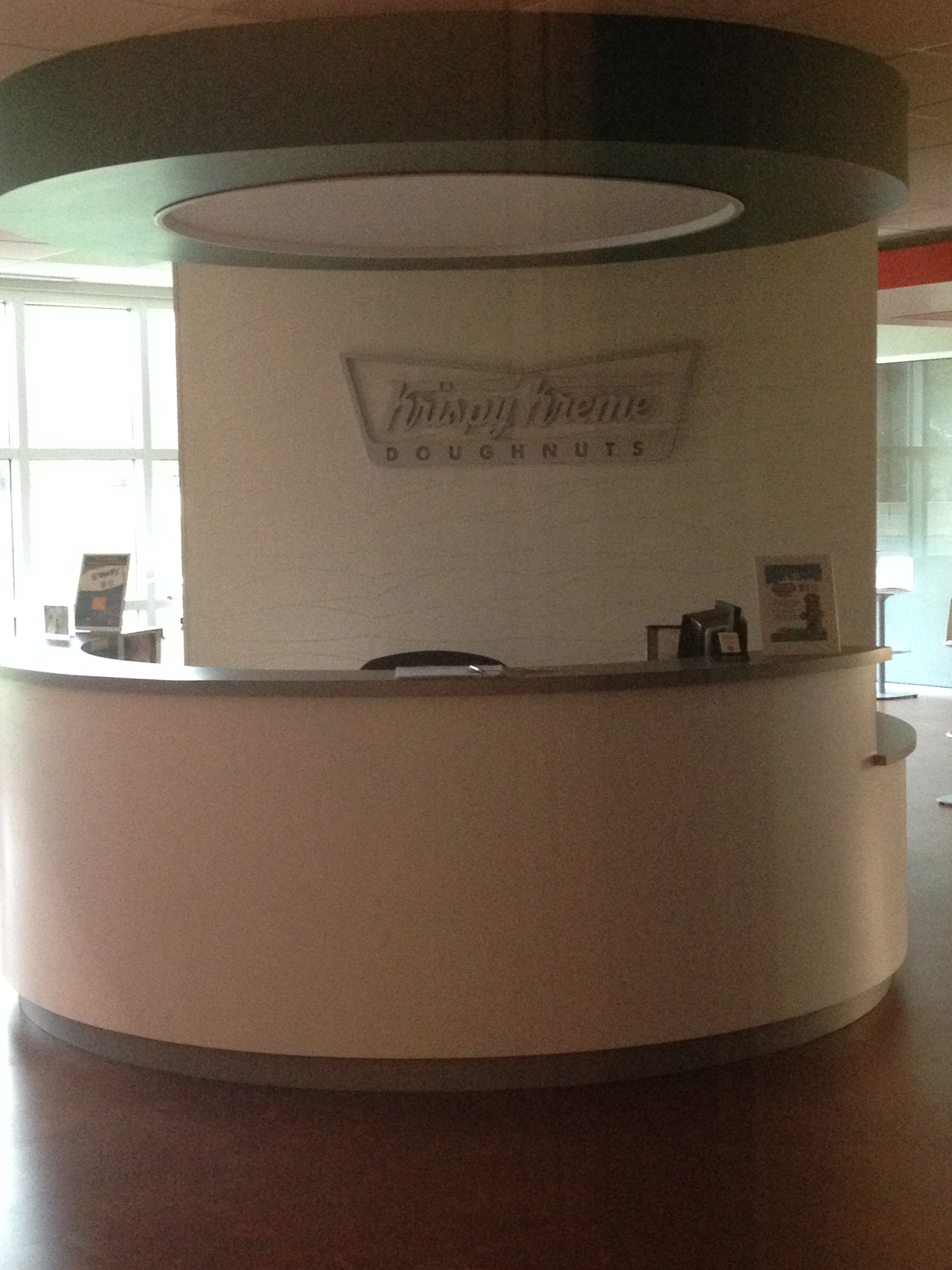
Reception desk at Krispy Kreme corporate offices

Expansion occurred in the 1950s, including an early store in Savannah, Georgia. By the 1960s, Krispy Kreme was known throughout the Southeast, and it began to expand into other areas. In 1976, Krispy Kreme Doughnut Corporation became a wholly owned subsidiary of Beatrice Foods of Chicago, Illinois. The headquarters for Krispy Kreme remained in Winston-Salem. A group of franchisees purchased the corporation back from Beatrice Foods in 1982.

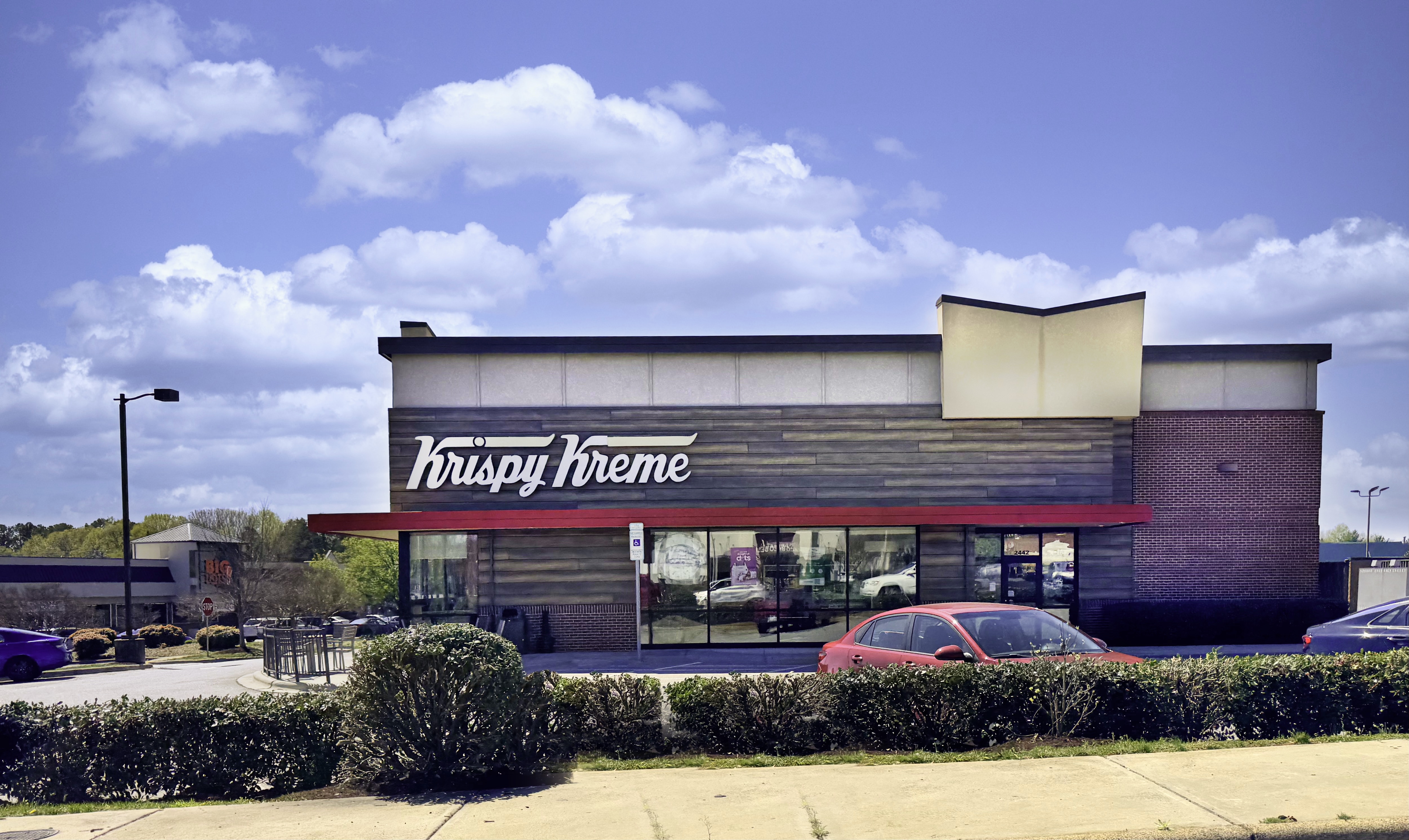
A modern Krispy Kreme shop in Clemmons, North Carolina

Krispy Kreme began another phase of rapid expansion in the 1990s, opening stores outside the southeastern United States where most of their stores were located. In December 2001, Krispy Kreme opened its first store outside the US in Mississauga, Ontario, Canada. The minimum investment amount to open a Krispy Kreme franchise ranges from approximately $450,000 to above $4M.

=== IPO and accounting scandals ===
On April 5, 2000, the corporation went public on the NASDAQ at $21 using the ticker symbol KREM. On May 17, 2001, Krispy Kreme switched to the New York Stock Exchange, with the ticker symbol KKD, which it carried until its private acquisition. The stock reached what would be its all-time high of $50 on the New York Stock Exchange in August 2003, a gain of 135% from its IPO price. For the fiscal year ending in February 2004, the company reported sales of $665.6 million and operating profits of $94.7 million from almost 400 stores (including international locations). The market initially considered the company as having "solid fundamentals, adding stores at a rapid clip and showing steadily increasing sales and earnings."

In May 2004, the company missed quarterly estimates for the first time and suffered its first loss as a public company. Chairman and CEO Scott Livengood attributed the poor results to the low-carbohydrate diet craze. This explanation was viewed with skepticism by analysts, as "blaming the Atkins diet for disappointing earnings carried a whiff of desperation", and as rival doughnut chain, Dunkin' Donuts, has not suffered from the low-carb trend over the same compared period.

By 2005, the company's stock had lost 75–80% of its value, amid earnings declines, as well as an SEC investigation over the company's alleged improper accounting practices. A turnaround plan in December 2005 aimed to close unprofitable stores in order to avoid bankruptcy.

Analysts suggested Livengood expanded too rapidly post-IPO, over-concentrating certain markets. While this approach initially grew revenues and profits at the parent-company level, due to royalty payments from new franchisees, this reduced the profitability of individual franchisees in the long run as they were forced to compete with one another. For the 2003–04 fiscal year, while the parent enjoyed a 15% increase in second-quarter revenues, same-store sales increased only a tenth of a percent. Krispy Kreme also had supermarkets and gas stations carry their doughnuts, which soon contributed up to half of the chain's sales, creating further market saturation as well as increasing competition to its franchisees. All this expansion devalued Krispy Kreme brand's novelty by making the once-specialty doughnuts ubiquitous, particularly as the newer sales outlets required pre-made doughnuts as opposed to the ones made fresh in factory stores, which alienated brand devotees.

Besides royalty payments from new stores, the parent company also enjoyed significant profits by requiring franchisees to purchase mix and doughnut-making equipment from the parent's Krispy Kreme Manufacturing and Distribution (KKM&D) division. KKM&D earned $152.7 million in 2003, which made up 31% of sales, with a reported operating margin of 20% or higher, but these mark-ups were largely at the expense of its franchisees. By comparison, rival chain Dunkin' Donuts generally avoids selling equipment or materials to its franchisees which "keeps company and franchisee interests aligned", as well as having a royalty stream based on same-store sales.

Krispy Kreme has been accused of channel stuffing by franchisees, whose stores reportedly "received twice their regular shipments in the final weeks of a quarter so that headquarters could make its numbers". The company was also dogged by questionable transactions and self-dealing accusations over the buybacks of franchisees, including those operated by company insiders. A report released in August 2005 singled out then-CEO Livengood and then-COO John W. Tate to blame for the accounting scandals, although it did not find that the executives committed intentional fraud.

On March 4, 2009, the SEC issued a cease and desist order against Krispy Kreme for its actions inflating their revenues and engaging in illicit activities regarding the purchasing of its own stores to prop up revenues and setting up mechanisms to guarantee that it beat earnings estimates by $0.01, which eventually resulted in Krispy Kreme reducing net income over two years by over $10.5 million. In it, the SEC proposed remedial actions for Krispy Kreme to take.

=== Return to private ownership ===
Krispy Kreme Flagship in Times Square (2021)

In May 2016, JAB Holding Company, a German investment firm, announced that it made an offer to purchase the company for $1.35 billion over the following two months that would make the company privately owned. The transaction closed on July 27, 2016. In December 2017, Krispy Kreme moved its corporate headquarters to Charlotte, North Carolina; while Winston-Salem retained the majority of operational departments and the Krispy Kreme Support Center.

Also in 2010, Krispy Kreme Express, a delivery service for businesses, began testing at the Battleground Avenue location in Greensboro, North Carolina. In the early 2010s, the company began developing shops with tunnel ovens, which allow for an all-day "Hot Now" hot doughnut experience.

On February 24, 2015, Krispy Kreme opened its 1,000th shop, in Kansas City, Kansas.

In 2018, Krispy Kreme acquired bakery chain Insomnia Cookies at a $175mm enterprise value, which continues to operate independently. On August 25, 2020, the first Krispy Kreme vending machine was launched in North Carolina, featuring three-packs of doughnuts available 24 hours a day.

In 2022, Krispy Kreme began operating new sales models in a "hub and spoke" model to distribute donuts to more access points like convenience and grocery stores and McDonald's restaurants. At the end of 2023 Krispy Kreme had reached 14,000 different points where its donuts are sold.

=== Going public again ===
In May 2021, Krispy Kreme confidentially filed for an initial public offering to once again go public. The company went public again on the Nasdaq on July 1, 2021, under the name Krispy Kreme Inc.

On March 26, 2024, Krispy Kreme and McDonald's announced a partnership where Krispy Kreme doughnuts would be gradually rolled out to all McDonald's locations nationwide by the end of 2026. This followed a successful test market experiment in Kentucky. Markets such as Pittsburgh and Columbus, Ohio, were selling Krispy Kreme products at McDonald's by the end of 2024. By June 2025, Krispy Kreme announced the McDonald's partnership would be terminated due to "unsustainable operating costs" and insufficient demand.

In 2024, Krispy Kreme sold a majority stake of Insomnia Cookies, to Verlinvest and Mistral Equity Partners, at a $350mm enterprise value.

== International operations ==
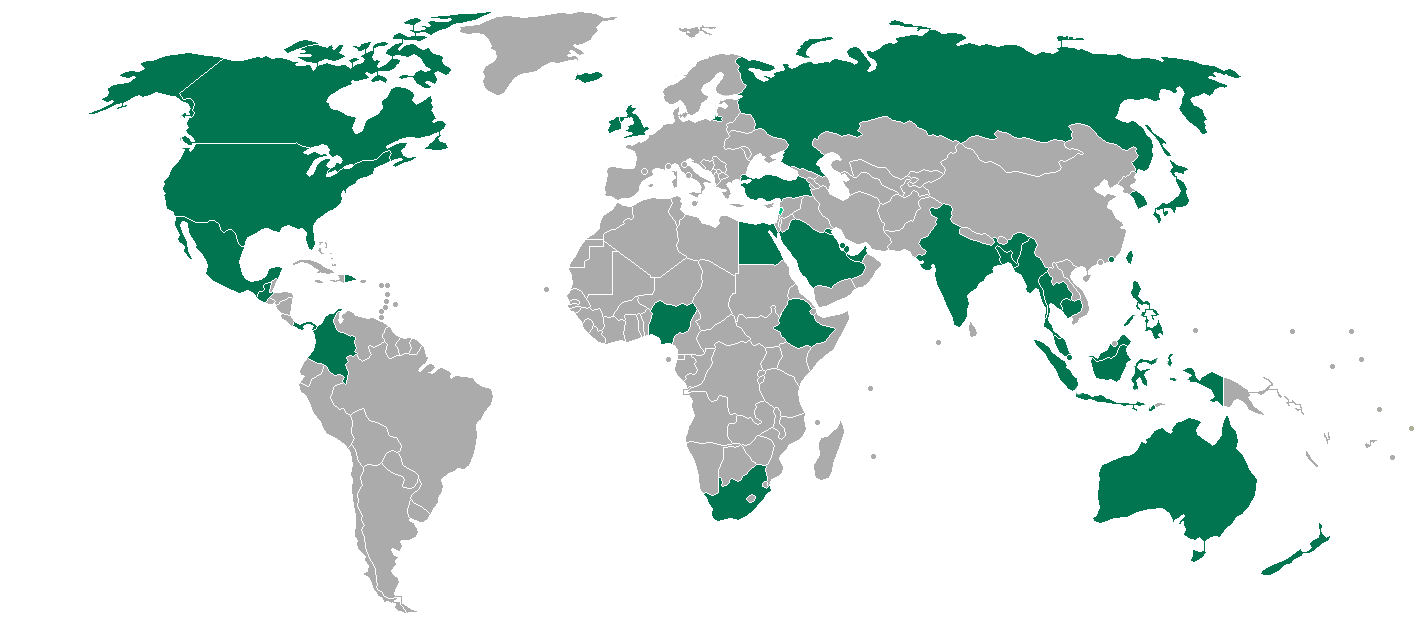
Current locations Former locations

The first Krispy Kreme store to open outside North America was in Penrith, part of metropolitan Sydney in Australia. The second Krispy Kreme store that was opened internationally was in the United Kingdom and was in Harrods department store London. It closed in June 2011. As of 2018, there are over 100 stand alone Krispy Kreme stores in the UK, and a presence in 500 Tesco stores. Besides the stores that Krispy Kreme operate in the United States and Canada, there are also locations in Egypt, France, the United Kingdom, Australia, New Zealand, South Africa, Spain, Lebanon, Turkey, India, the Dominican Republic, Iceland, Ireland, Kuwait, Guatemala, Mauritius, Mexico, Costa Rica, Panama, Russia, Taiwan, South Korea, Malaysia, Thailand, Brazil, Indonesia, the Philippines, Japan, Singapore, Cambodia, Jordan, the United Arab Emirates, Qatar, Saudi Arabia, Bahrain, Hong Kong, Nigeria, Ethiopia, Jamaica and Chile.

In August 2011, Krispy Kreme's Japanese operation planned to increase the number of stores from 21 to 94, and its Mexican operation announced the number of stores would increase from 58 to 128 in five years. In the United Kingdom, Krispy Kreme continues its expansion and had plans and funding in place to open further stores in 2012. In South Korea, their first store opened on December 16, 2004, and celebrated their 100th store opening exactly ten years later, on December 16, 2014. As of September 2016, they held the most stores in the Asia-Pacific region with 129 stores. Krispy Kreme opened its first store in India on January 19, 2013, in Bangalore, Karnataka. The stores are operated by Citymax Hotels India under a franchise arrangement. On July 23, 2014, Krispy Kreme launched its first shop in Chennai, India, at Express Avenue mall.

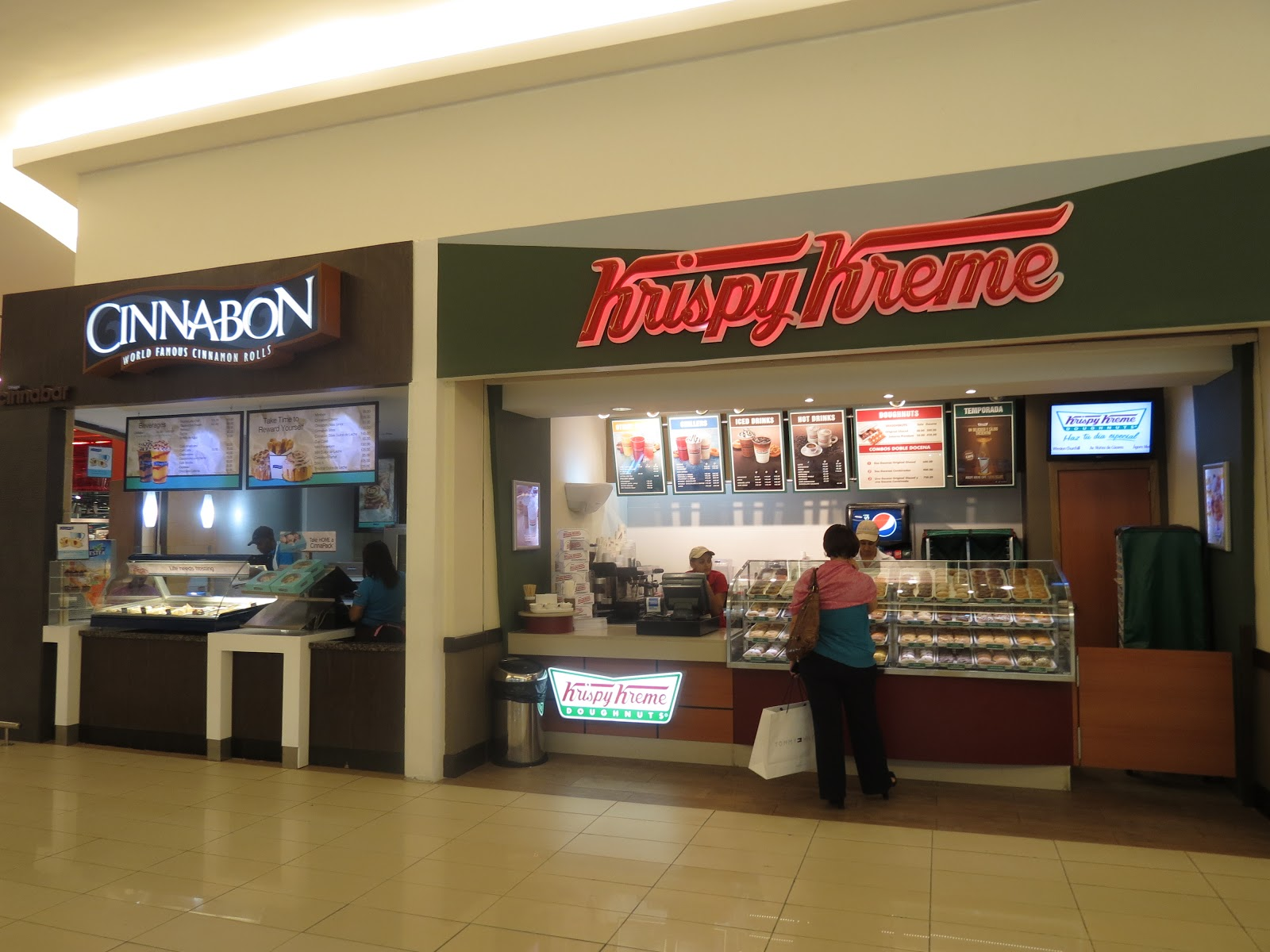
A Krispy Kreme store in Santo Domingo, Dominican Republic, next to a Cinnabon store

On September 25, 2013, Krispy Kreme announced the opening of 25 stores, all within 5 years, in Colombia. This marks the first South American country for the company. In October 2014, Krispy Kreme opened another store at Colombia in Bogotá and Chía, Cundinamarca. On December 12, 2013, Krispy Kreme opened its first store in Taipei, Taiwan.

On May 18, 2015, Krispy Kreme announced it had signed a development agreement with KK Doughnuts SA (Pty) Ltd., to open 31 Krispy Kreme shops in South Africa over the following five years. This marked the company's first venture into Africa. On September 10, 2015, Krispy Kreme signed a development agreement with Agape Coral, SAC to open 24 shops over the next five years in Peru. On November 25, 2015, Krispy Kreme opened its first store in Rosebank, Johannesburg, South Africa. On December 2, 2015, Krispy Kreme opened its largest store in the United Kingdom in Glasgow, Scotland.

On May 5, 2016, Krispy Kreme opened their first store in Bangladesh at Banani in Dhaka and quietly left the country around 2020. On July 27, 2016, Krispy Kreme was acquired by JAB Beech. Under the terms of the transaction, company shareholders received $21 per share in cash for each share they own. As a result of the completion of the acquisition, Krispy Kreme's common stock ceased trading on the New York Stock Exchange. On November 5, 2016, Krispy Kreme opened its first store in Kópavogur, Iceland.

On January 12, 2017, Krispy Kreme opened its first store in Panama City, Panama.

On January 27, 2018, Krispy Kreme opened its first store in Guatemala City, Guatemala. On February 28, 2018, Krispy Kreme opened its first store in Manukau, Auckland, New Zealand. On March 10, 2018, Krispy Kreme opened its first store in Ikeja City Mall, Lagos, Nigeria. On September 26, 2018, Krispy Kreme opened its first store in Dublin, Ireland, which has since become the most profitable store worldwide.

On May 13, 2023, Krispy Kreme opened its first store in Costa Rica. It expanded to France in December 2023 with its first Paris store, which was expected to make 45,000 doughnuts per day. The company's menu was tweaked to appeal to French customers, including a gingerbread flavored doughnut.

On August 9, 2024, Krispy Kreme opened its first store in Morocco.

On April 29, 2025, Krispy Kreme opened its first store in Brazil. By late 2025, Krispy Kreme operated four locations in Costa Rica.

On November 17, 2025, Krispy Kreme opened its first store in Tashkent, Uzbekistan.

On June 29, 2026, the company announced an agreement with Apollo Group to bring Krispy Kreme to Estonia, with the country's first shop expected to open in late 2026.

== Products ==
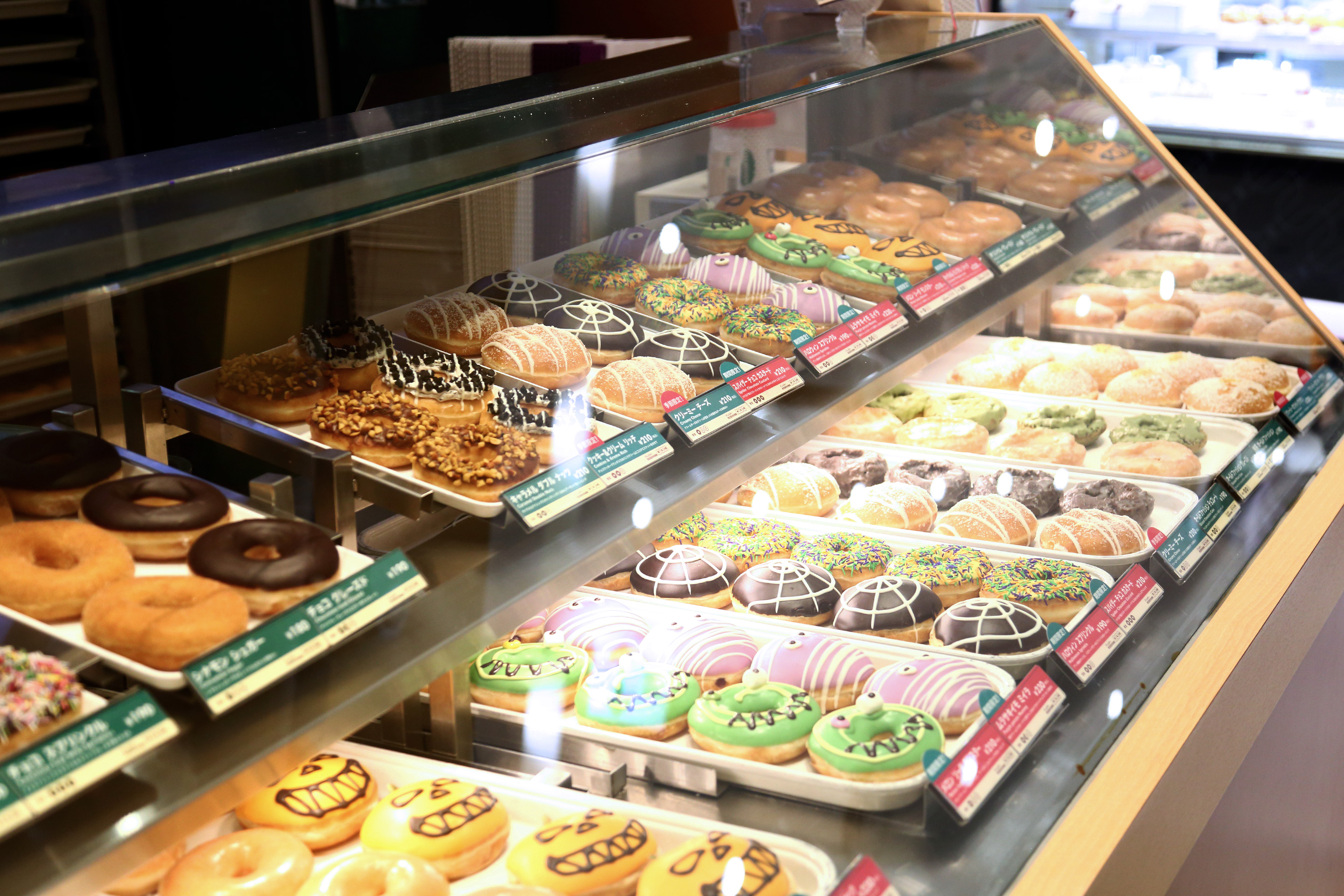
An assortment of doughnuts on display in a shop in Tachikawa, Tokyo

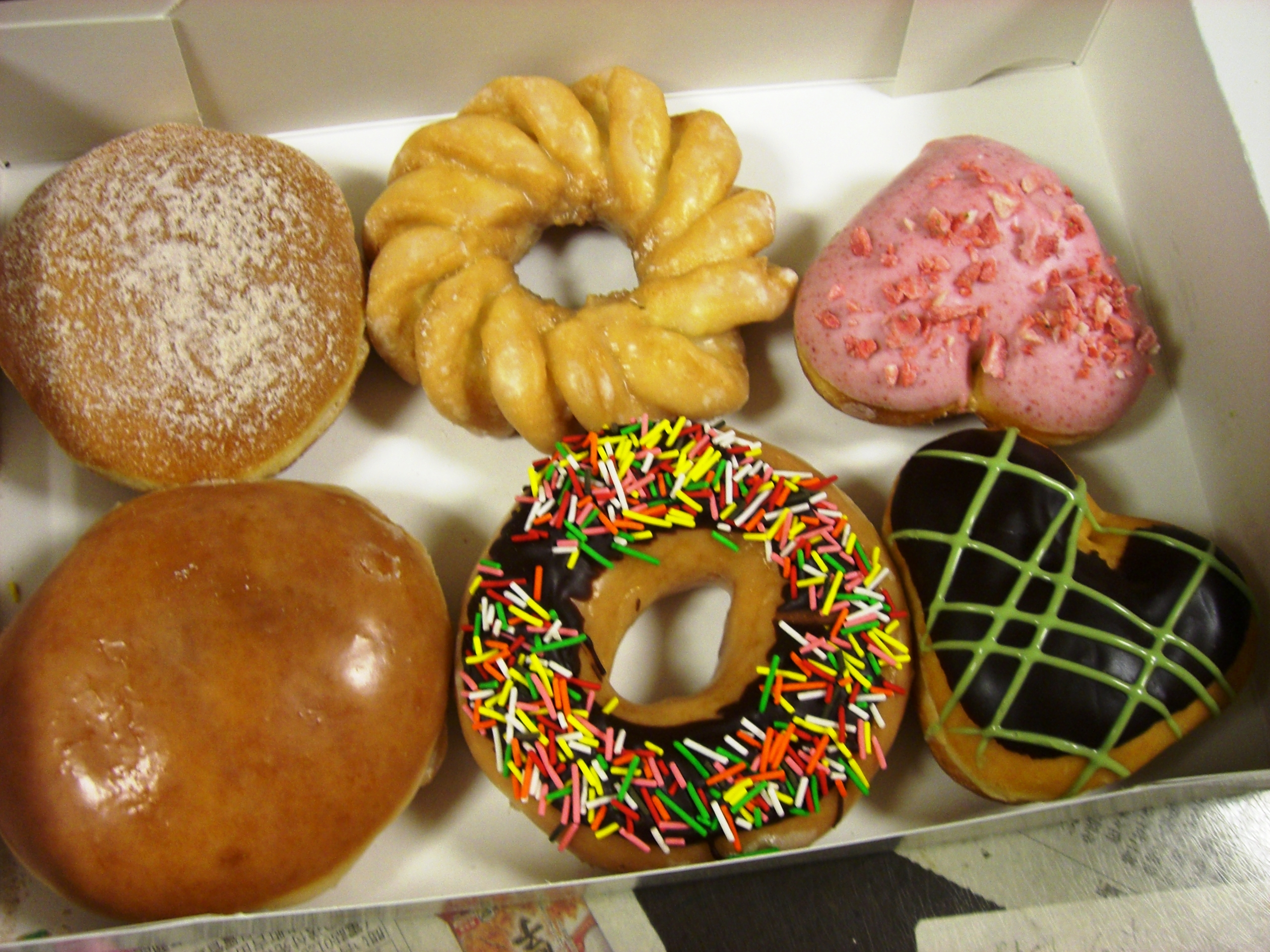
Krispy Kreme doughnuts

On February 19, 2007, Krispy Kreme began selling the Whole Wheat Glazed doughnut in an attempt to appeal to the health conscious. The doughnut has nearly the same number of calories as the original glazed doughnut (180 calories vs. 190 calories) but contains more fiber (2 grams vs. 0.5 grams). As of January 2008, the trans fat content of all Krispy Kreme doughnuts was reduced to 0.5 of a gram or less. The U.S. Food and Drug Administration, in its guidelines, allows companies to round up to 1 g in its nutrition facts label when the food contains as much as 0.5 of a gram per serving. Krispy Kreme benefited from this regulatory rule in its subsequent advertising campaign, touting its doughnuts as "trans fat-free" and having "0 grams trans fat!". On July 1, 2010, Krispy Kreme introduced a doughnut that included the soft drink Cheerwine, which was to be sold in grocery stores in North and South Carolina during July. The doughnuts proved so popular that the Salisbury, North Carolina, Krispy Kreme location (the town where Cheerwine is made) sold them as well. After July 31, this was the only place to get them. The Cheerwine Kreme doughnut returned for July 2011 and made its debut in Tennessee and Roanoke, Virginia.

Krispy Kreme doughnuts being prepared (high quality)

On May 25, 2017, Krispy Kreme doughnut-flavored Jelly Belly jelly beans were announced.

On August 5, 2019, Krispy Kreme released two new Reese's-branded "chocolate lovers" and "peanut butter lovers" doughnuts to the public.

In July 2020, Krispy Kreme launched several candy-coated doughnuts with Nerds, Jelly Belly jelly beans, sour gummies, and marshmallows.

Krispy Kreme introduced a seasonal Pumpkin Spice Doughnut Collection in September 2020 with four flavors: 1) Pumpkin Spice Original Glazed Doughnut, 2) Pumpkin Spice Cake Doughnut, 3) Pumpkin Spice Original Filled Cheesecake Doughnut, and 4) Pumpkin Spice Cinnamon Roll Doughnut.

During Veganuary in January 2021, Krispy Kreme UK launched its Original Glazed vegan doughnut. In December 2021, Krispy Kreme UK launched three more vegan doughnut flavors, Fudge Brownie Bliss, Caramel Choc Delight, and Apple Custard Crumble.

In 2024, the Dolly Southern Sweets Doughnuts Collection included four new flavors available for a limited time in restaurants and some grocery stores—Dolly Dazzler, Peachy Keen Cobbler, Banana Puddin' Pie and Chocolate Creme Pie. Inspired by Dolly Parton, the flavors were the company's first inspired by a celebrity.

== Promotions ==
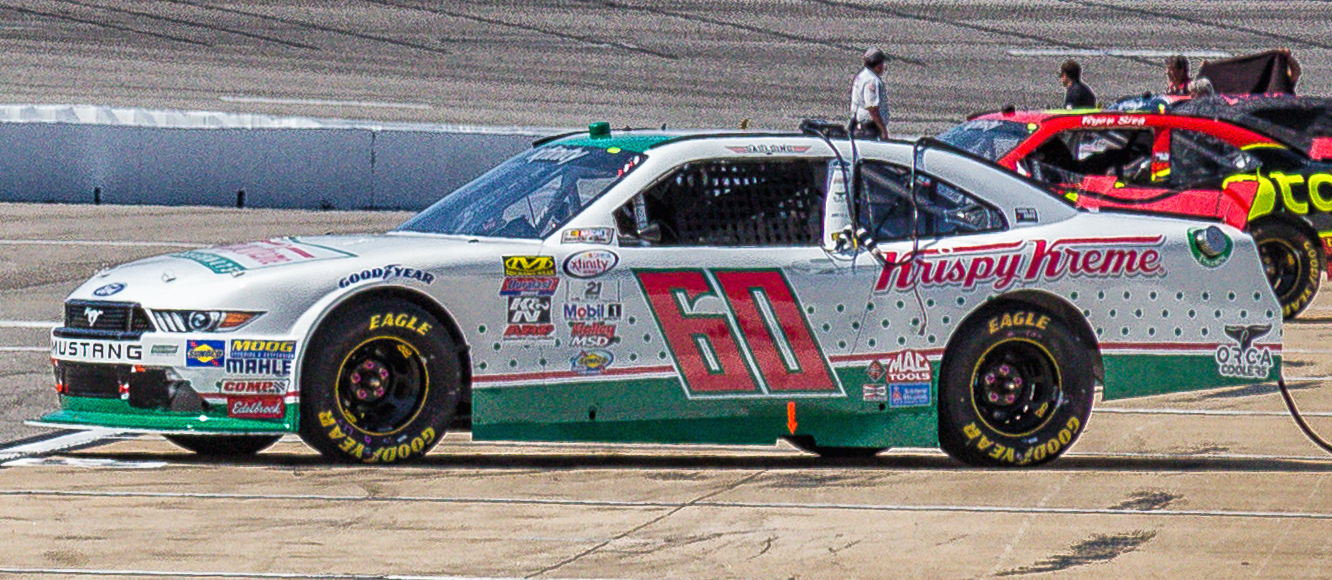
Krispy Kreme sponsorship on a NASCAR vehicle

Although based on informal advertising such as word-of-mouth, in 2006, Krispy Kreme moved into television and radio advertisements, beginning with its "Share the Love" campaign with heart-shaped doughnuts. Since 1955, the company has offered fundraising kits for organizations to sell boxes of doughnuts; Krispy Kreme would then split the proceeds with the organizations to raise funds for various causes.

In 2014, Krispy Kreme released a $1,685 doughnut as part of fundraising efforts for The Children's Trust. It was covered with 24-karat gold and was decorated with edible diamonds. The inside was made from Dom Pérignon champagne jelly.

In March 2021, Krispy Kreme announced that they were providing a free Original Glazed doughnut every day (except Thanksgiving Day and Christmas Day) for the rest of that year to customers in the US who could prove they have received a COVID-19 vaccine. Multiple physicians criticized this move, with former Baltimore health commissioner Leana Wen tweeting that a person who ate a doughnut every day without making other lifestyle changes could gain 15 pounds by the end of the year. Others criticized the physicians: Elyse Resch, a nutrition therapist, wrote: "It's an oppression. Weight stigma, fat-shaming, fatphobia—it's oppressive, like every other oppression in the world. And it's so wrong. We all deserve to have satisfaction in our eating, and having a doughnut is a delicious thing." In response to the criticisms, Krispy Kreme said, "Like many sweet treats, Krispy Kreme Doughnuts are an occasional indulgence best enjoyed in moderation. And we know that's how most of our guests enjoy our doughnuts. We're certainly not asking people to get a free Original Glazed doughnut every day, we're just making it available through the end of the year, especially given that not every group is eligible to get vaccinated yet."

== Controversies ==
=== Krispy Kreme Klub Wednesday ===
In February 2015, a Krispy Kreme branch in Kingston upon Hull, England, announced during the half-term break of schools that it was launching, among other events that week, "Krispy Kreme Klub Wednesday", during which children could decorate doughnuts. However, it attracted controversy after it was promoted as "KKK Wednesday" on Facebook, due to it sharing an abbreviation with the Ku Klux Klan, an American white supremacist group. Krispy Kreme promptly apologized, canceled the event, pulled all marketing relating to it, and launched an internal investigation.

=== Cage-free eggs ===
In 2016, Krispy Kreme committed to sourcing 100% cage-free eggs in the US by 2021, and globally by 2026. In 2024, the company stated it had achieved the goal of 100% cage-free egg use in U.S. operations, but commented that the supply constraints from avian flu drove them to review the commitment and timing of the global goal, stating intentions to set a new target once the supply chain stabilized.

== See also ==
- List of doughnut shops
- List of coffeehouse chains
