= Scott Livengood =

Owner and CEO of Dewey's Bakery, Inc

Scott Livengood (born 1952) is the owner and chief executive officer (CEO) of Dewey's Bakery, Inc., which was founded in 1930 in Winston-Salem, North Carolina. The company owns two brands, Salem Baking Company (SBC) and Dewey's Bakery. Salem Baking Company is a specialty cookie and cracker brand and a private-brand manufacturer. Dewey's Bakery is a retail bakery located in Winston-Salem, operating a high volume production/retail location and a satellite store. Dewey's Bakery specializes in traditional iced and fondant layers cakes, sheet cakes, cupcakes, cake squares, cake pops, cheesecakes, "cookie cakes", "brownie cakes", and "ice cream cakes and pies".

Livengood acquired the company in 2006 and has launched initiatives to grow its national brands through leading food retailers that account for the majority of the company's sales of premium, all-natural cookies, crackers, specialty and gift products, and custom and private-label products. From 2006 to 2012, sales grew 150% or a 16% compound annual growth rate (CAGR).

Scott Livengood is a former CEO of Krispy Kreme Corporation and was associated with that company for 28 years, beginning in 1977. It was then a privately held company based in Winston-Salem. He was named president in 1992. In 1998, he was named CEO, and one year later was elected chairman of the board. Livengood led the company through its greatest period of expansion, with growth from 95 stores in 11 states to 367 in 38 states. He also initiated and guided the development of the company's first international stores in Canada, Mexico, the United Kingdom, and Australia. Livengood oversaw the IPO of Krispy Kreme on the NASDAQ, and the switch to the New York Stock Exchange about a year later. Krispy Kreme was voted one of the top five brands in North America by readers of Brandchannel in 2001, 2002, and 2003.

However, Krispy Kreme has been accused of channel stuffing by franchisees, whose stores reportedly "received twice their regular shipments in the final weeks of a quarter so that headquarters could make its numbers". The company was also dogged by questionable transactions and self-dealing accusations over the buybacks of franchisees, including those operated by company insiders. A report released in August 2005 singled out then-CEO Scott Livengood and then-COO John W. Tate to blame for the accounting scandals, although it did not find that the executives committed intentional fraud.

In late 2004, CNBC columnist Herb Greenberg named Livengood the worst CEO of that year.

Livengood was born in North Carolina. He was educated in the public school system in Winston-Salem, North Carolina, and graduated from the University of North Carolina at Chapel Hill with a B.S. degree in 1974. Livengood, with his wife, has three children and one stepchild and resides in Winston-Salem.
