= Livengood (surname) =

Livengood is a surname. Notable people with the surname include:

- Henry Livengood (1933–1988), American politician
- Scott Livengood (born 1952), American chief executive officer
- Victoria Livengood (born 1959), American opera singer
- Wes Livengood (1910–1996), American baseball player, scout and manager
