= Pizza Haven (United States) =

American pizza delivery chain

Pizza Haven was an American Seattle-based pizzeria and pizza delivery chain, known as dial-a-pizza, founded in 1958 and opening its first location in the University District, Seattle, near the University of Washington. Pizza Haven was one of the first pizza companies to make deliveries. Restaurant employees used radio phones to relay orders to roving drivers who carried stacks of pizzas in warming ovens in the back of their jeeps and pickup trucks.

Ron Bean, the original founder, and a series of partners grew Pizza Haven into a chain of 42 restaurants throughout the Pacific Northwest and California. The 700-employee company also opened franchises in Russia, Poland and the Middle East.

== History ==
In the mid-1970s, Bean branched out, opening a second restaurant chain called Bean Pod Delis that offered baked goods and health food. By the mid-1980s, his partner wanted out so a portion of the chain was sold to Pietro's Pizza, which itself had just been bought by the Campbell's.

By the late 1990s, increasing competition from better-funded national chains, leasing difficulties at some mall locations and what Bean describes in hindsight as several "bad decisions" combined to push Pizza Haven into filing for Chapter 11 bankruptcy protection. A missed tax payment then forced the company into involuntary Chapter 7 bankruptcy in 1998. The remaining stores were shuttered, except for the Pizza Haven and Bean Pod restaurants in Seattle Center Center House.

The Seattle Center location closed in April 2012.

== See also ==
- List of pizza chains
