= Krispy Kreme UK =

United Kingdom subsidiary of Krispy Kreme Doughnuts

Krispy Kreme U.K. Limited (trading as Krispy Kreme UK) is the United Kingdom subsidiary of Krispy Kreme, an American company. The UK headquarters are in Camberley, Surrey.

== Conception ==
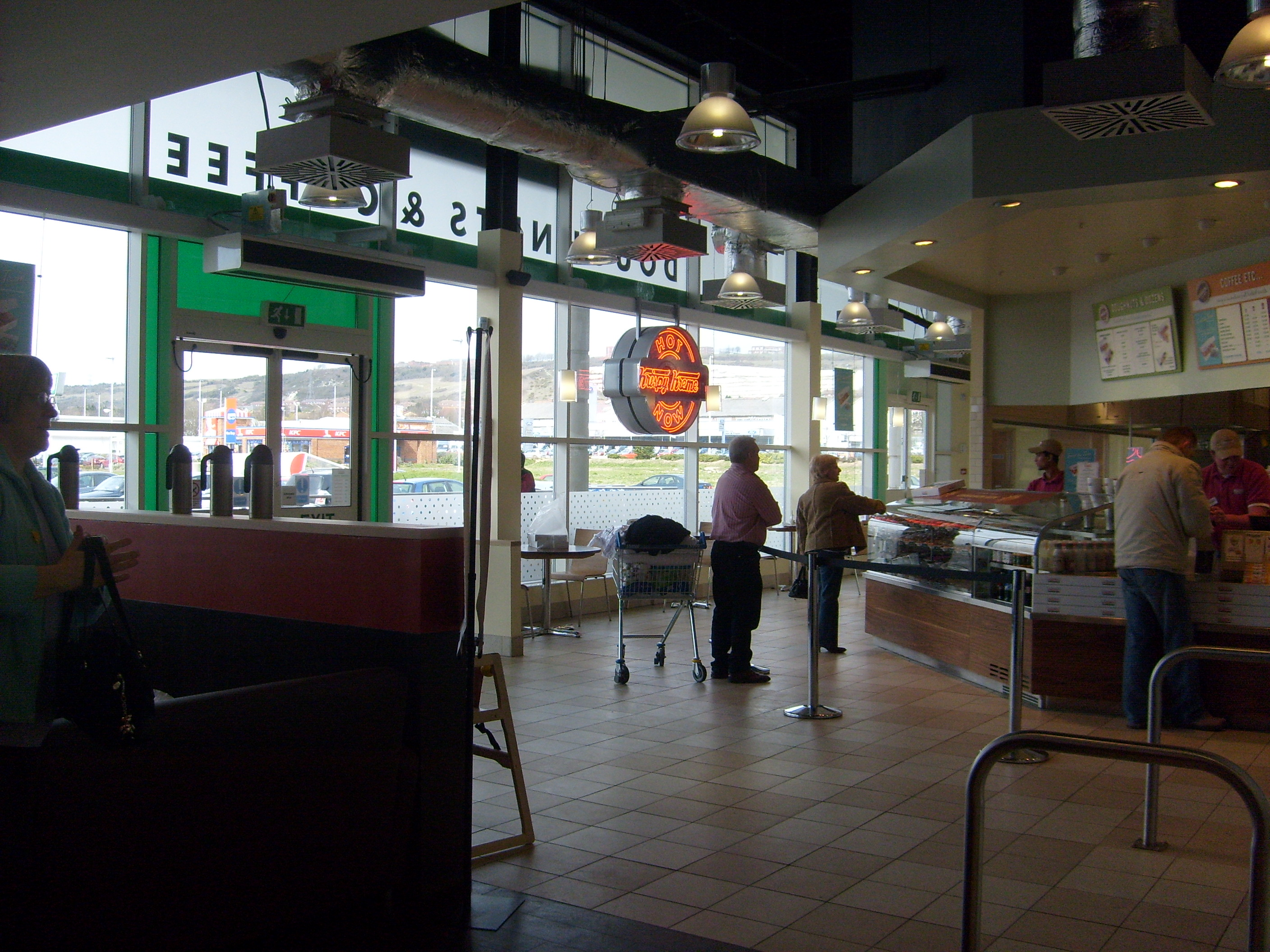
Inside a 'factory' Krispy Kreme located within the Tesco Extra store at North Harbour, Portsmouth, England.

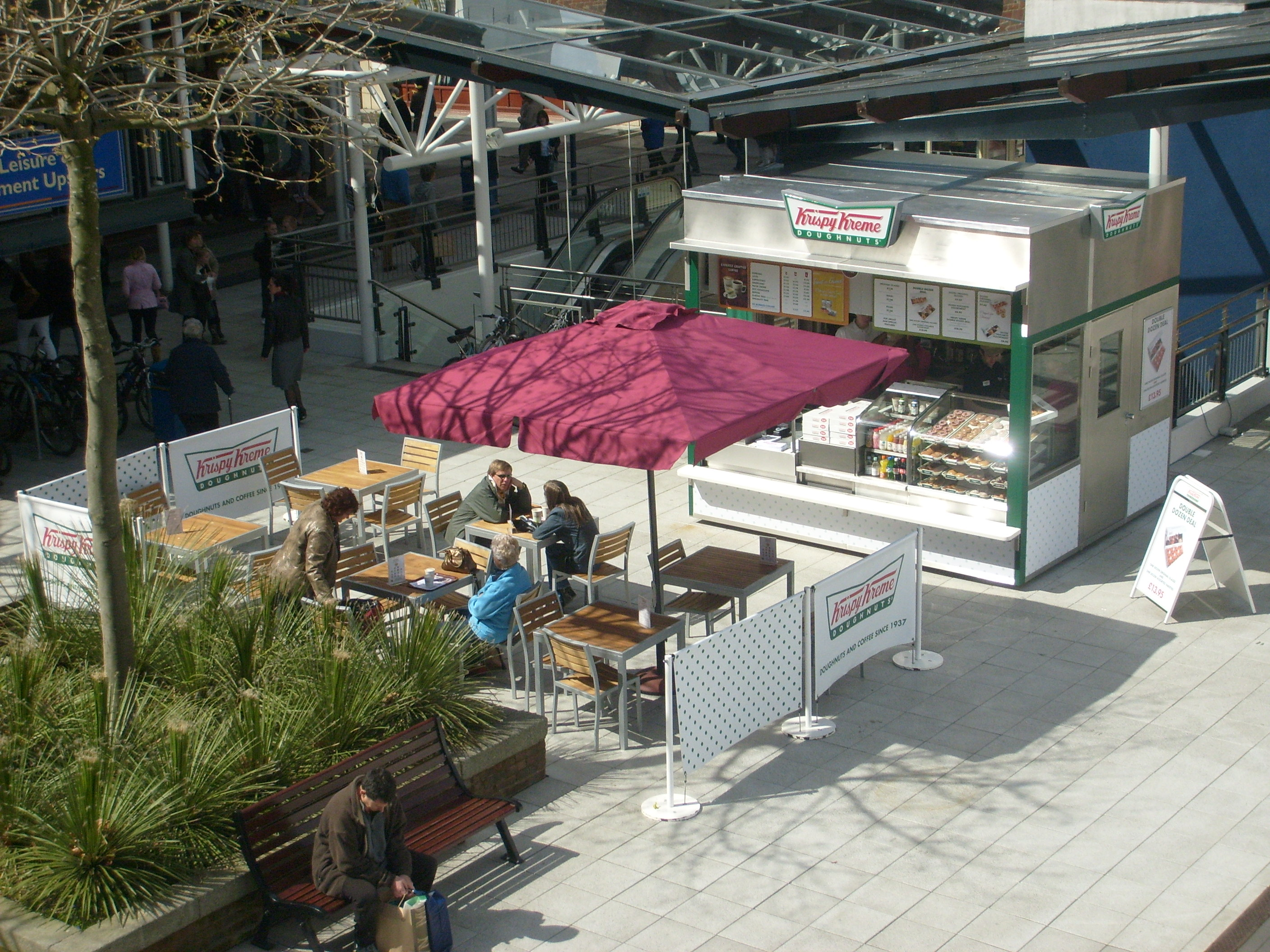
A 'fresh' Krispy Kreme kiosk at Gunwharf Quays, Portsmouth on opening day 12 April 2008.

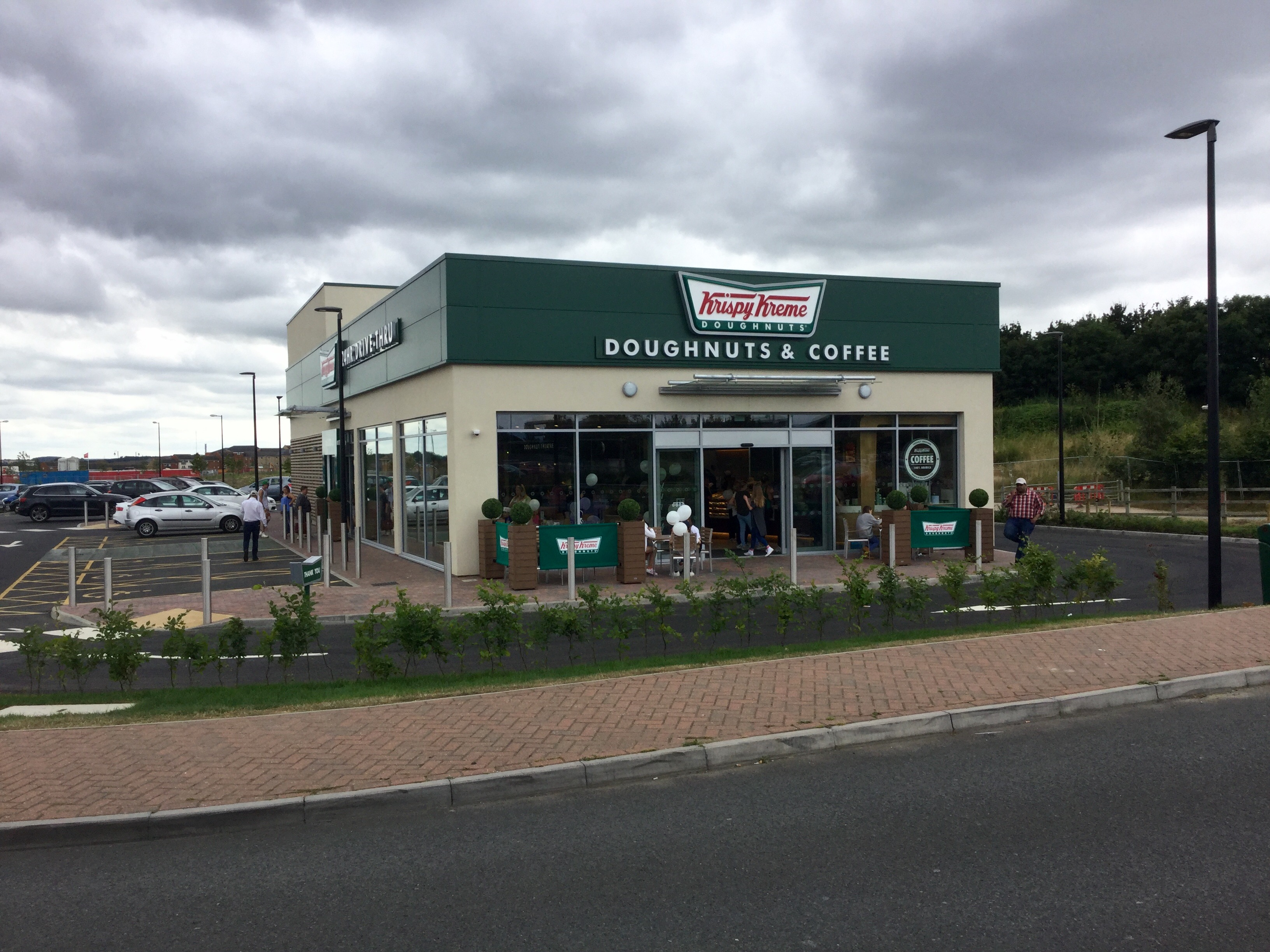
Krispy Kreme restaurant in Peterborough in Cambridgeshire

In October 2003, Krispy Kreme Doughnuts opened their first store location in the United Kingdom. The store situated in the world-famous Harrods department store in London became one of 35 stores in the UK, but it closed in June 2011. A Leeds store opened on 5 July 2010 and was the furthest away from the Greater London area until September 2012, which saw the opening of the Gateshead store situated in the MetroCentre. 3 Stores have been opened in Manchester and were the furthest away from the Greater London area until the Leeds and Gateshead locations opened. (Krispy Kreme no longer has franchise opportunities or development rights available in the United Kingdom, according to its website). Other stores outside Greater London include Birmingham (inside Selfridges), Oxford, Portsmouth (2 locations), Southampton, Bristol, Milton Keynes, Brighton, Gatwick Airport, Hull in St Stephen's Shopping Centre, Telford, Stansted Airport, Preston, Lancashire and Luton Airport.

Krispy Kreme's 2003 UK arrival coincides with the 2002 departure of its major competitor Dunkin' Donuts from the UK, which met with much less success than Krispy Kreme and operated only 10 stores, which included one in Westfield Merry Hill, (near Birmingham), one in Birmingham city centre and four in London.

At the end of March 2011, business.Scotsman.com reported that Krispy Kreme plan to expand into Scotland in 2011 opening outlets in Glasgow and Edinburgh. Krispy Kreme later stated that while Edinburgh and Glasgow were plausible locations for future outlets, no plans had been announced. In October 2011, it was announced by Edinburgh Planning that an application for planning permission at Hermiston Gait had been approved along with KFC. Krispy Kreme subsequently opened their first store in Scotland on 13 February 2013. It progressed further and opened another store in Glasgow at Braehead on 2 December at 7am.

In Wales at least two stores located in the Cardiff Saint Davids Centre, Newport Friars Walk Shopping Centre that opened in 2015 and Store in Swansea Quadrant Centre that opened on 7 September 2017 and in Bridgend designer outlet along with local Tesco stores featuring Krispy Kreme kiosks immediately upon entering the stores.

== Products ==
Krispy Kreme Doughnuts offer 16 varieties of doughnuts in the UK plus the occasional feature doughnut. As well as 8 hot drinks and coffee, 10 milkshakes and cold drinks and their original glazed donut holes.

== See also ==
- List of doughnut shops
- List of coffeehouse chains
