= Livengood gold deposit =

Coordinates: 65°30′24″N 148°32′22″W

The Livengood gold deposit is an advanced gold exploration project located 70 miles (110 km) northwest of Fairbanks, Alaska.

Placer gold was discovered in Livengood Creek in 1914. The hardrock Livengood gold deposit was located by drilling by AngloGold Ashanti (U.S.A.) Exploration Inc. in 2003 and 2004. Livengood was acquired from AngloGold Ashanti in 2006 by the current project owner International Tower Hill Mines (ITHM). In 2016 ITHM reported proven and probable reserves of 391.66 million tonnes of ore at a grade of 0.71 g/t of gold for 8.97 million ounces.
