= BJ's Restaurants =

American restaurant chain

Coordinates: 33°44′05″N 117°59′42″W

BJ's Restaurants, Inc.

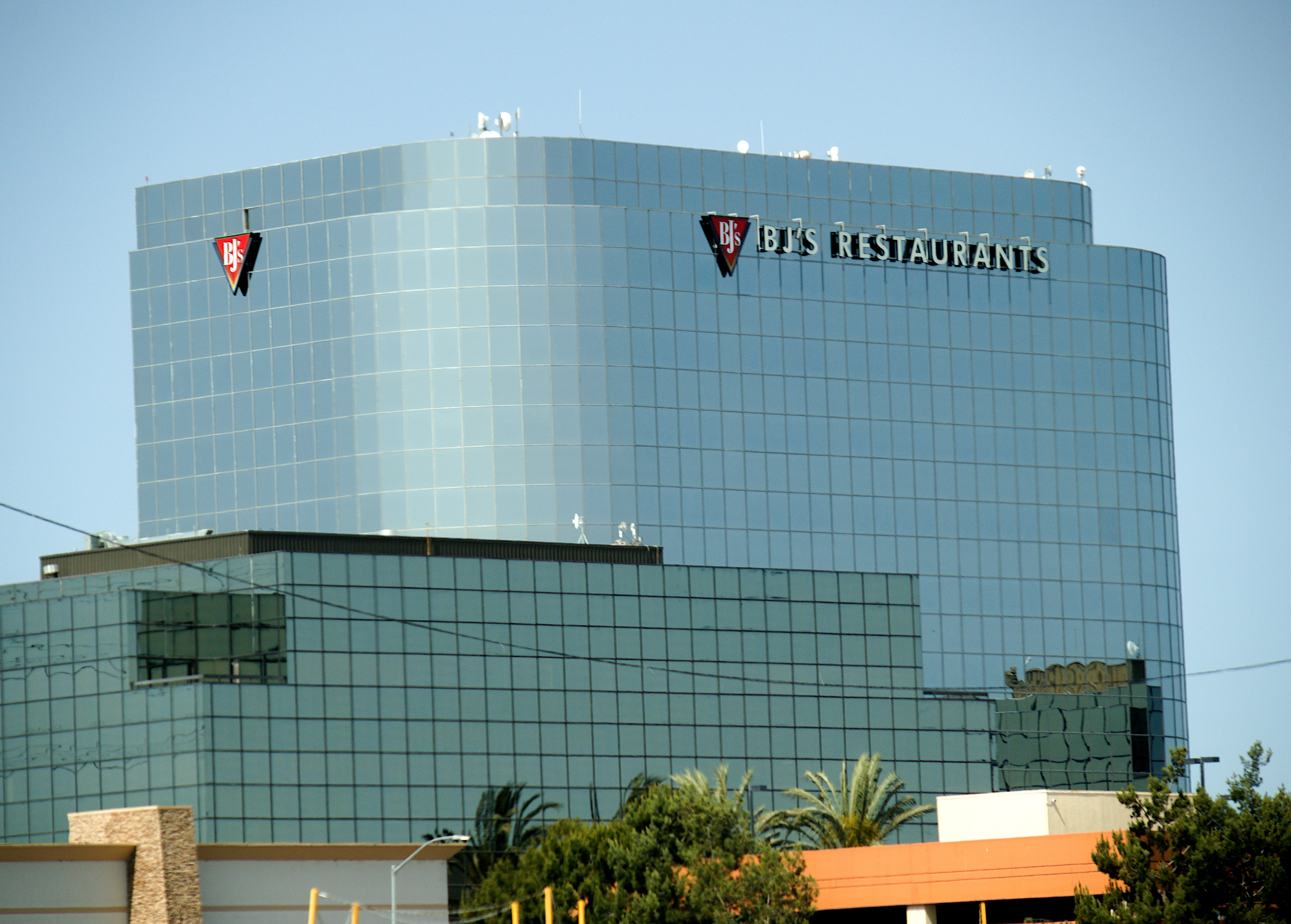
- Headquarters in Huntington Beach, California
- Trade name: BJ's Grill; BJ's Pizza & Grill; BJ’s Restaurant & Brewery; BJ’s Restaurant & Brewhouse
- Formerly: BJ's Chicago Pizzeria
- Type: Public
- Traded as: Nasdaq: BJRI; S&P 600 component
- Industry: Restaurant; microbrewery
- Genre: Casual dining
- Founded: 1978; 48 years ago, Santa Ana, California
- Founders: Jim Kozen; Leonard Allenstein
- Headquarters: Huntington Beach, California, US
- Number of locations: 215 (2022)
- Area served: United States
- Key people: Jim Kozen; Greg Levin president; Lyle D. Tick CEO
- Products: American food
- Services: Catering
- Revenue: ▲US$1.283 billion (2023)
- Operating income: ▲US$13.759 million (2023)
- Net income: ▲US$19.660 million (2023)
- Total assets: ▲US$1.058 billion (FY 2023)
- Total equity: ▲US$365.761 million (FY 2023)
- Number of employees: 21,200 (2021)
- Website: www.bjsrestaurants.com

BJ's Restaurants, Inc. is an American restaurant chain, headquartered in Huntington Beach, California. The chain operates under the names BJ's Restaurant & Brewery, BJ's Restaurant & Brewhouse, BJ's Grill, and BJ's Pizza & Grill.

== History ==
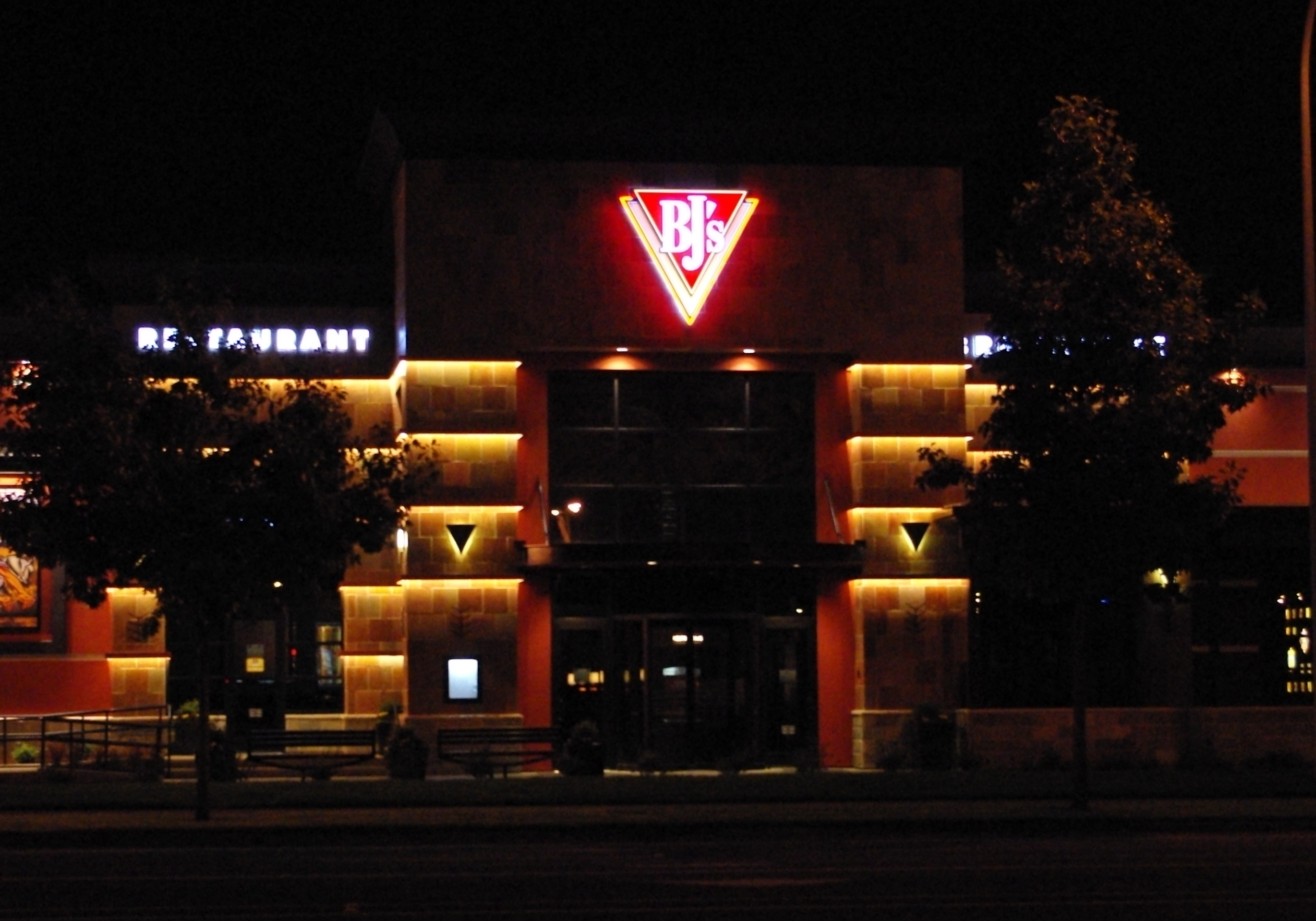
A BJ's in Hillsboro, Oregon

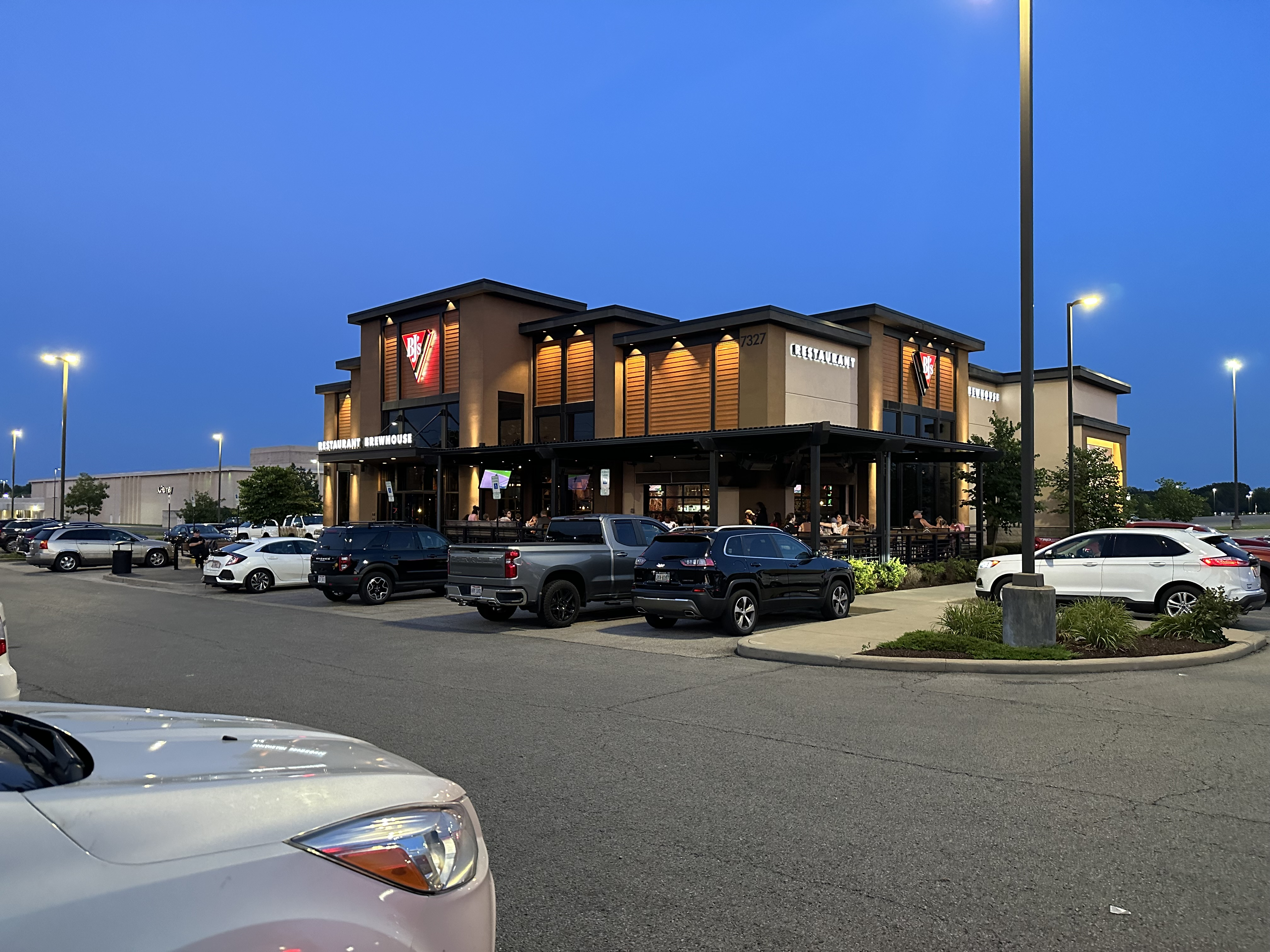
A BJ’s in Boardman, Ohio

BJ's was founded in 1978 by Jim Kozen and Leonard Allenstein. It first opened in Santa Ana, California, as BJ's Chicago Pizzeria. The original name was BJ Grunts, but due to a federal trademark conflict with RJ Grunts, a Chicago-based hamburger restaurant, the name was changed. Shortly after the opening of the first restaurant, Mike Phillips and Bill Cunningham bought 50% of the company for $14,000. Kozen and Allenstein left the group after the opening of the seventh store. Phillips and Cunningham sold the company to their accountants Paul Motenko and Jerry Hennessy in 1991.

Originally known as Chicago Pizza, the company went public in 1996, raising $9.4 million. The company then bought 26 Pietro's Pizza restaurants in March 1996 in a $2.8 million deal in cash and assumed debt, but then sold off seven of the locations with plans to convert the remaining Pietro's to what was then BJ's Pizza. During the same year, the company opened a microbrewery at its Brea restaurant.

In 2013, BJ's produced a combined total of 60,000 barrels annually at their 11 brewery restaurants to serve their chain of 136 restaurants in 15 states. In 2021, Greg Levin was appointed to CEO.

As of December 2022, BJ's operated 215 restaurants in 29 states.
