= Cookie cake =

Dessert

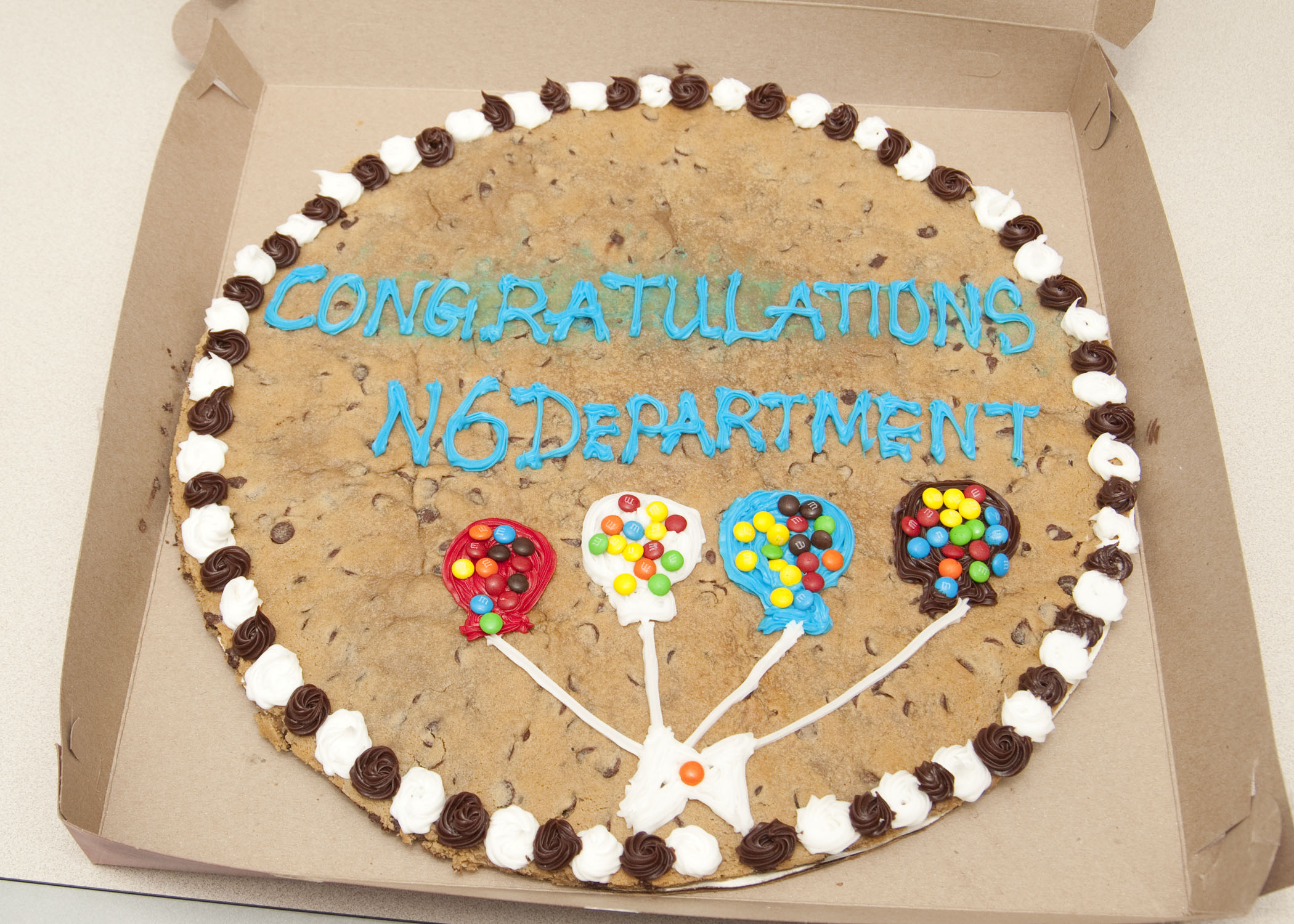
- A custom-decorated cookie cake
- Type: Dessert
- Place of origin: United States
- Created by: Michael J. Coles and Arthur Karp
- Main ingredients: Cookie dough, icing

A cookie cake is a dessert that consists of a large cookie, which is baked similarly to a batch of regular-sized cookies and usually decorated with frosting. Cookie cakes are made with cookie dough, generally by adjusting the portions of existing cookie recipes to match the size of the pan used for baking. Cookie cakes can be baked in a variety of sizes; they are also served and sliced in sections, similarly to cakes and pies.

The cookie cake was first conceived by Michael J. Coles and Arthur Karp, two businessmen who wanted to get into the cookie business and founded the company Great American Cookies. Coles was inspired to use his grandmother's chocolate chip cookie recipe after visiting a busy cookie shop in a San Diego mall.

Cake batter can be layered on top of cookie dough in a pie crust to form a cookie cake pie. These can be iced after baking, or topped with whipped cream.

== Skillet cookies ==
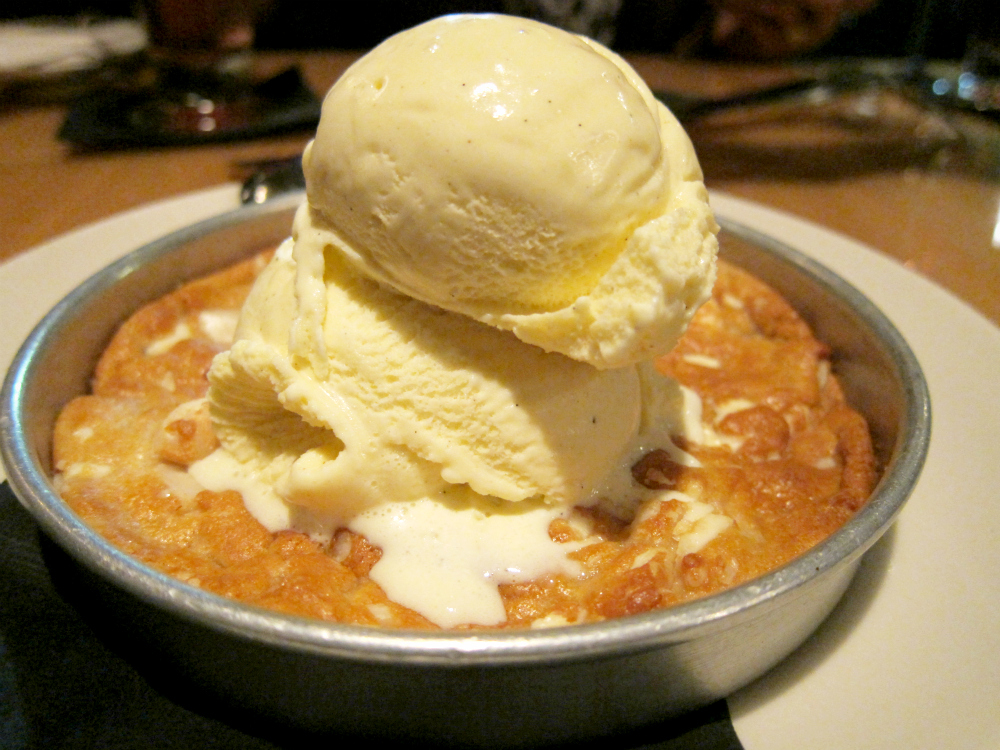
A BJ's Pizookie

A skillet cookie is type of cookie cake that is prepared in a skillet or other deep-sided pan. They are usually served warm and may be topped with ice cream, syrup, and other toppings. Skillet cookies are usually served in the pan they were baked in.

BJ's Restaurants sells skillet cookies under the trade name "pizookie". The name is a portmanteau of the words "pizza" and "cookie," as the cookie resembles a deep-dish pizza baked in a skillet.

== See also ==
- List of cakes
