= Pietro's Pizza =

Pizza chain in Oregon, United States

Pietro's Pizzas

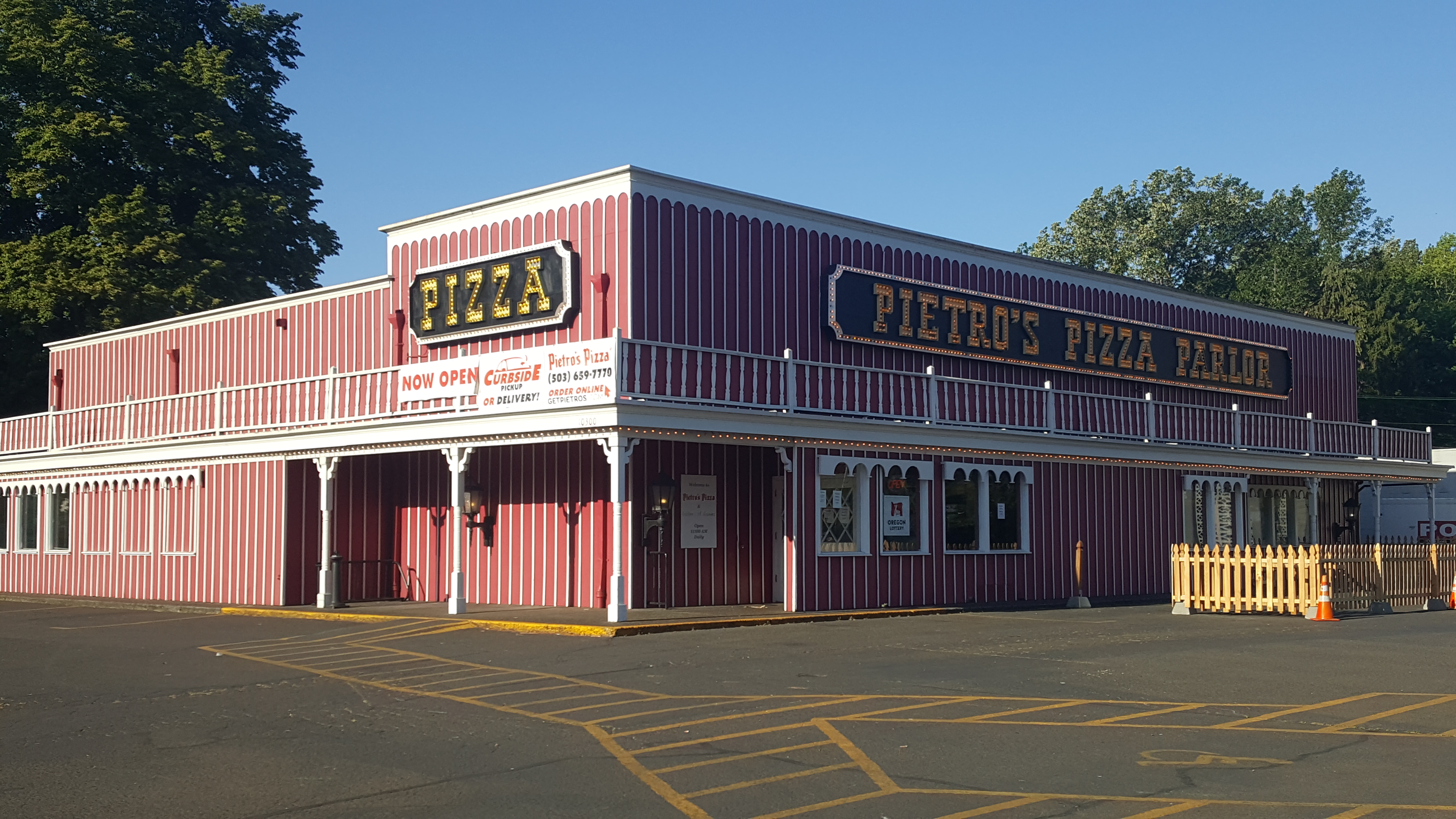
- Industry: Fast food restaurants
- Founded: 1957; 69 years ago
- Headquarters: Milwaukie, Oregon
- Number of locations: 3 restaurants
- Products: Pizza
- Website: www.pietrosrestaurants.com

Pietro's Pizza is a small pizza chain in the U.S. state of Oregon. Founded in 1957, the chain grew to about 80 restaurants and changed owners several times before shrinking to only three restaurants. The company is based in Milwaukie, Oregon.

== History ==
Norm Kolln started the company in Longview, Washington, in 1957. Kolln grew the chain and in the early 1970s sold out to the Campbell's who grew Pietro's to about 60 locations in Oregon and Washington before selling it in the late 1980s. Investors from California led by Bob Adamowski bought the chain from Campbell's in 1988 and continued expansion to close to 80 outlets by the early 1990s before a steep decline. The headquarters were moved to Bothell, Washington, where Pietro's Corp. filed a Chapter 11 bankruptcy in 1995 when the number of locations had dropped to 45. Chicago Pizza & Brewery Inc. then bought 26 of the remaining restaurants in March 1996 in a $2.8 million deal in cash and assumed debt, but then sold off seven of the locations with plans to convert the remaining Pietro's to what was then BJ's Pizza.

Conversions began on some stores in 1997, with the Eugene, Oregon, restaurant being the first location converted to BJ's. By March 1999 BJ's had converted all but 10 Pietro's, with the chain shrinking to three locations by 2004. In February 2004, employees Ken Bay and Ray David bought the remaining three stores for $2.2 million. A Beaverton location opened in March 2014 and closed December 2023.

== Current locations ==
The chain's remaining locations are all within Oregon: in Hood River, Salem, and Milwaukie.

Norm Kolln's son Michael re-opened the original Longview location with the same recipes in late 2008 as "The Original Pie@trio’s Pizzeria". Norm Kolln's two grandsons remodeled the former Eugene/Glenwood Pietros and opened Roaring Rapids Pizza Co., in 2000.
