= Channel stuffing =

Business practice used to inflate sales

Channel stuffing, also known as trade loading, is a business practice in which a company, or a sales force within a company, inflates its sales figures by forcing more products through a distribution channel than the channel is capable of selling. This can be the result of a company attempting to inflate its sales figures. Alternatively, it can be a consequence of a poorly managed sales force attempting to meet short-term objectives and quotas in a way that is detrimental to a company in the long term.

Channel stuffing has a number of long-term consequences for a company. Firstly, distributors will often return any unsold goods to the company, incurring a carrying cost and also developing a backlog of product inventory. Wildly fluctuating demand, combined with the excess inventory, leads to costly overtime and factory shutdowns. Even mild channel stuffing can spiral out of control as the sales department works to make up for prior overselling. Discounts used to drive trade loading can greatly affect profits, and even help establish gray market channels, because salespeople no longer adequately qualify their prospects.

Occasionally, distribution channels such as large retailers have been known to identify the practice of channel stuffing by their suppliers, and use the phenomenon to their advantage. That is done by holding back on orders until the end of a supplier's quota period. The supplier's sales force then panics, and sells a large amount of the product under more favorable terms than they would under ordinary circumstances. At the beginning of the next period, no new orders are placed, and, barring any action, the cycle is then repeated. That affects customers, creating gluts and shortages as buyers turn to competing products.

Corporations have been known to engage in channel stuffing and hide the activity from their investors. In the United States, the U.S. Securities and Exchange Commission has in some cases litigated against such corporations, and private class-action suits have been filed. Channel stuffing might also be part of a broader pattern of financial impropriety.
