= List of food companies =

This is a list of food companies, current and past businesses involved in food production or processing.

== Africa ==
- All Joy Foods
- Bakers
- BOS Ice Tea
- Cevital
- Choppies
- Clover
- Colcom Foods
- Distell Group Limited
- Famous Brands
- Golden Web
- Kenya Wine Agencies Limited
- Les Domaines Agricoles
- Meat Corporation of Namibia
- Melcom
- Nile Breweries Limited
- Pioneer Foods
- SOMED
- Spur Corporation
- Tiger Brands
- Tilda Uganda
- Tongaat Hulett

== Argentina ==
- Grupo Arcor
- Havanna
- La Serenísima
- Molinos Río de la Plata
- SanCor

== Australia ==
- The a2 Milk Company
- Arnott's Group
- Baiada Poultry
- Bakers Delight
- Balfours
- Baskin-Robbins Australia
- Beerenberg Farm
- Bega Cheese
- Bellamy's Australia
- Bickford's Australia
- Boost Juice
- Breadtop
- Brooklyn Boy Bagels
- Bulla Dairy Foods
- Bundaberg Brewed Drinks
- Camperdown Dairy International
- Canberra Milk
- Darrell Lea
- Dick Smith Foods
- Ernest Hillier Chocolates
- Ferguson Plarre Bakehouses
- Frosty Boy
- Haigh's Chocolates
- Huon Aquaculture
- Inghams Enterprises
- Isis Central Sugar Mill
- Lion Dairy & Drinks
- Mrs Mac's Pies
- Murray Goulburn Co-operative
- Norco Co-operative
- Nuttelex
- Patties Foods
- Retail Food Group
- San Remo Macaroni Company
- Sanitarium
- Schweppes Australia
- Snack Brands Australia
- So Natural
- Sustagen
- Tassal
- Thomas Foods International
- Three Threes Condiments
- Warrnambool Cheese and Butter
- Weis
- Wendy's Supa Sundaes
- Wesfarmers

== Austria ==
- Agrana
- Brauerei Ottakringer
- Do & Co
- Julius Meinl
- Manner
- Pez
- Rauch
- Red Bull GmbH

== Azerbaijan ==
- Bahra Biscuit Factory
- Shollar water
- Vinagro

== Bangladesh ==
- Akij Group
- IFAD Group
- Kazi Farms Group
- Meghna Group of Industries
- Milk Vita
- PRAN-RFL Group
- Square Group
- T K Group of Industries

== Belgium ==
- Anheuser-Busch InBev
- Cavalier Chocolate
- Confiserie Roodthooft
- Delhaize Group
- Duc d'O
- Glacio
- John Martin Brewery
- Jules Destrooper
- Le Pain Quotidien
- Leonidas
- Lotus Bakeries
- Meurens
- Neuhaus
- Vanparys
- Ysco

== Brazil ==
- Brazilian Fast Food Corporation
- BRF S.A.
- Chocolates Sönksen
- Garoto
- Grupo Petrópolis
- International Meal Company
- JBS S.A.
- Marfrig
- Pastifício Selmi
- Q-Refres-Ko
- Todeschini Alimentos
- Vigor S.A.

== Bulgaria ==
- Vitta Foods

== Canada ==
- Agropur
- Bothwell Cheese
- Canyon Creek Food Company
- Chapman's
- Cott
- Daiya
- Dan-D Foods
- Dare Foods
- Earth's Own Food Company
- Ganong Bros.
- Gay Lea
- George Weston Limited
- Jim Pattison Group
- Just Us!
- Kawartha Dairy Company
- Lassonde Industries
- Laura Secord Chocolates
- Lesters Foods Ltd.
- Liberté_Inc.
- M&M Food Market
- Maple Leaf Foods
- McCain Foods
- Metro Inc.
- Mike's Hard Lemonade Co.
- MTY Food Group
- Nature's Path
- Naya Waters
- Olymel
- Organic Meadow Cooperative
- Première Moisson
- Premium Brands Holdings Corporation
- Purdy's Chocolates
- Purity Factories
- Recipe Unlimited
- Restaurant Brands International
- Rogers Sugar
- Saputo
- Sobeys
- SunOpta
- Voortman Cookies

== Caribbean ==
- Nomad Foods

== Chile ==
- Castaño
- Compañía de las Cervecerías Unidas
- Concha y Toro
- Cooperativa Agrícola y Lechera de La Unión Limitada
- IANSA
- Soprole

== China ==
- Amoy Food
- Bright Food
- Chaoda Modern Agriculture
- COFCO Group
- Convenience Retail Asia
- Dachan Food
- Dairy Farm International Holdings
- Foshan Haitian Flavouring & Food Co
- Fufeng Group
- Fujian Dali Group
- Global Sweeteners
- Hangzhou Wahaha Group
- Hanwei Group
- Huiyuan Juice
- Kee Wah Bakery
- Kweichow Moutai Company
- La Rose Noire
- Mengniu Dairy
- Shuanghui
- Tien Chun Ve-Tsin
- Ting Hsin International Group
- Uni-President Enterprises Corporation
- Viro
- Want Want
- Xinjiang Chalkis Co.Ltd
- Yili Group
- Yurun Group
- Zoo Holdings Group

== Colombia ==
- Alpina Productos Alimenticios
- Alquería
- Grupo Nutresa
- Postobón
- Quala

== Croatia ==
- Agrokor
- Atlantic Grupa
- Čakovečki mlinovi
- Franck
- Kandit
- Koestlin
- Kraš
- Podravka
- Vindija
- Zvečevo

== Cuba ==
- José Arechabala S.A.

== Denmark ==
- Arla Foods
- Carlsberg Group
- Chr. Hansen
- Co-Ro Food
- Danish Agro
- Danish Crown AmbA
- DAVA Foods
- Friis-Holm
- Kohberg Bakery Group
- Knuthenlund
- Løgismose Meyers
- Stauning Whisky
- Toms International

== Finland ==
- Atria
- Fazer
- HKScan
- Kaslink Foods
- Paulig
- Raisio Group
- Valio

== France ==
- Alter Eco
- Amorino
- Bel Group
- Biscuiterie Saint-Michel
- Biscuits Fossier
- Bonduelle
- Bongrain
- Bonnat Chocolates
- Castel Group
- Comigel
- Compagnie des Fromages et RichesMonts
- Cooperl Arc Atlantique
- Dalloyau
- Danone
- Daregal
- Debauve & Gallais
- Délifrance
- Fleury Michon
- Groupe Bigard
- Groupe Doux
- Groupe Holder
- Groupe Le Duff
- Groupe Limagrain
- Hédiard
- La Vie Claire
- Lactalis
- Lur Berri
- Menier Chocolate
- Michel et Augustin
- Pernod Ricard
- Picard Surgelés
- The Soufflet Group
- Tereos
- Valrhona

== Germany ==
- Aldi
- Alnatura
- Asbach Uralt
- August Storck
- Bahlsen
- Born Feinkost
- C. Hahne Mühlenwerke GmbH & Co. KG
- Coppenrath & Wiese
- Dr. Oetker
- Düsseldorfer Löwensenf
- Frosta AG
- Granini
- Halloren Chocolate Factory
- Händlmaier
- Hans Adler
- Haribo
- Intersnack
- Lorenz Snack-World
- Mederer GmbH
- Meica
- Mestemacher
- Müller
- Niederegger
- Nordzucker
- Schwarz Gruppe
- Südzucker
- Teekampagne
- Teekanne
- Waldemar Behn
- Wild
- Zott

== Greece ==
- Arapian
- Evga S.A
- Haitoglou Bros
- Ion
- KYKNOS S.A.
- Melissa S.A.
- Mevgal
- Miran Pastourma
- Papadopoulos
- Terkenlis
- Vivartia

== Hungary ==
- Borsod Brewery
- Győri Keksz
- Hell Energy Drink
- Pick Szeged

== India ==
- Adyar Ananda Bhavan
- Amul
- Bisleri
- Banas Dairy
- Bihar State Milk Co-operative Federation
- Britannia Industries
- Dabur
- Dudhsagar Dairy
- Everest Spices
- Haldiram's
- Hatsun Agro Product
- ITC Limited
- Karnataka Milk Federation
- Kerala Co-operative Milk Marketing Federation
- Marico
- Meat Products of India
- Mother Dairy
- Orissa State Cooperative Milk Producers' Federation
- Parle Agro
- Parle Products
- Patanjali Ayurved
- Ravi Foods Private Limited
- Tata Consumer Products

== Indonesia ==
- ABC Foods
- Delta Djakarta
- Greenfields
- Indofood
- Japfa
- Kino Food
- Mayora Indah
- Multi Bintang Indonesia
- My Kopi-O!
- Roti Bunz
- Sariwangi
- Siantar Top
- Sido Muncul
- Sosro
- Wings Food
- Yupi

== Ireland ==
- Abbey Cheese Company
- Ardsallagh Goat Farm
- Barry's Tea
- Béal Organic Cheese
- Bewley's
- Bluebell Falls
- Burren Smokehouse
- Butlers Chocolates
- C&C Group
- Cahill's Farm Cheese
- Carlow Brewing Company
- Carrigaline Farmhouse Cheese
- Donegal Creameries
- Flahavan's
- Fyffes
- Gleeson Group
- Greencore
- Hadji Bey
- Irwin's Bakery
- Kerry Group
- Lakeland Dairies
- Lyons Tea
- Mauds Ice Creams
- Murphys Ice Cream
- Nobó
- Old Bushmills Distillery
- Ornua
- R&H Hall
- Shamrock Foods
- Tayto (Northern Ireland)
- Tayto (Republic of Ireland)
- Valeo Foods

== Israel ==
- Angel Bakeries
- Berman's Bakery
- Osem
- Prigat
- Strauss
- Tara
- Yehuda Matzos

== Italy ==
- Amedei
- Auricchio
- Autogrill
- Dolciaria Balconi
- Balocco
- Barilla Group
- Bartolo Nardini
- Bertagni
- Campari Group
- Carapelli
- Cielo
- Cirio
- Coppola Foods
- De Cecco
- Domori
- Elledi
- Ferrero SpA
- Gelati Cecchi
- Giovanni Rana
- Girolamo Luxardo
- Granarolo
- Grom
- Guglielmo coffee
- La Molisana
- Lavazza
- Lazzaroni
- Loacker
- Marzadro Distillery
- Massimo Zanetti Beverage Group
- Nardini
- Nonino Grappa
- Parmalat
- Pernigotti
- Polli
- Saclà Italia
- San Carlo
- Sterilgarda
- Venchi
- Vicenzi
- Voiello

== Japan ==
- Ajinomoto
- Asahi Breweries
- Calbee
- Ezaki Glico
- Fujimitsu Corporation
- Fujiya
- House Foods
- Kabaya
- Kagome
- Kikkoman
- Kirin Company
- LEOC Japan
- Maruchan
- Maruha Nichiro
- Marukome
- Meiji Dairies
- Meiji Seika
- Mizkan
- Morinaga
- Nippon Flour Mills
- Nippon Ham
- Nippon Suisan Kaisha
- Nissin Foods
- Saikabo
- Sapporo Brewery
- Shidax
- Snow Brand Milk Products
- Suntory
- Tohato
- Toyo Suisan
- Yakult
- Yamazaki Baking
- Zensho

== Kuwait ==
- Americana Group
- Kout Food Group

== Malaysia ==
- BOH Plantations
- Dutch Lady Milk Industries
- Felda Global Ventures Holdings
- The Italian Baker
- Kart's
- Mamee Double-Decker
- Munchy's
- Polar Ice Cream
- Ramly Group
- Sabah Tea
- Sime Darby
- United Plantations
- Yit Foh Tenom Coffee

== Mexico ==
- Ah Cacao Real Chocolate
- Alpura
- Alsea
- Bachoco
- Búfalo
- Chilchota Alimentos
- Cholula Hot Sauce
- Gruma
- Grupo Anderson's
- Grupo Bimbo
- Grupo La Norteñita
- Grupo Lala
- Ibarra
- Jarritos
- Jose Cuervo
- La Costeña
- Mayordomo
- Sidral Mundet
- Sigma Alimentos
- Valentina

== Netherlands ==
- Ahold Delhaize
- AVEBE
- Bavaria Brewery
- Douwe Egberts
- Droste
- FrieslandCampina
- Heineken International
- Ketel One
- Lucas Bols
- Nutreco
- Remia
- Royal Wessanen
- Vion NV

== New Zealand ==
- Alliance Group
- Chelsea Sugar Refinery
- Cookie Time
- Emerson's Brewery
- Evansdale Cheese
- Fonterra
- Foodstuffs
- Foxton Fizz
- Goodman Fielder
- Gregg's
- Griffin's Foods
- Healtheries
- Hubbard Foods
- Jimmy's Pies
- Lewis Road Creamery
- Livestock Improvement Corporation
- McCashins Brewery
- Monteith's
- My Food Bag
- Progressive Enterprises
- Restaurant Brands
- Silver Fern Farms
- Speight's
- Synlait
- Talley's Group
- Tatua Dairy Company
- Tegel Foods
- Westland Milk Products
- Whitestone cheese
- Whittaker's
- Wigram Beer
- Zealong

== Norway ==
- Bama Gruppen
- Brynild Gruppen
- Cermaq
- Coop Norge
- Den Lille Nøttefabrikken
- Drammens Is
- Felleskjøpet
- Fjordland
- Friele
- Gartnerhallen
- Hennig-Olsen Iskremfabrikk
- HOFF Norske Potetindustrier
- Hval Sjokoladefabrikk
- Isklar
- Kavli
- Kavli Trust
- Lerum
- Maarud
- Nora Industrier
- Nortura
- Norway Royal Salmon
- Orkla Group
- SalMar
- Synnøve Finden
- Tine
- Vinmonopolet

== Pakistan ==
- Dalda
- Engro Corporation
- Fauji Foundation
- Gourmet Foods
- K&N's
- Mitchell's Fruit Farms Limited
- Murree Brewery
- National Foods Limited
- OMORÉ
- Pakola
- Shan Food Industries
- Shezan International
- Peek Freans

== Peru ==
- Ajegroup
- Alicorp
- Corporación Lindley S.A.
- Don Jorge
- Enrique Cassinelli and Sons
- La Iberica

== Philippines ==
- Alaska Milk Corporation
- Asia Brewery
- Bounty Agro Ventures
- CDO Foodsphere
- Century Pacific Food
- Comfoods
- Delimondo
- Eng Bee Tin
- Figaro Coffee Company
- Food Terminal Inc.
- Fruitas Holdings
- Goldilocks Bakeshop
- Jollibee Foods Corporation
- Liwayway Holdings Company
- Malagos Chocolate
- Mama Sita's Holding Company
- Max's Group
- Monde Nissin
- NutriAsia
- Potato Corner
- Rebisco
- RFM Corporation
- San Miguel Corporation
  - San Miguel Food and Beverage
- Serenitea
- Shawarma Shack
- SL Agritech Corporation
- Tanduay Distillers
- Universal Robina
- Viva International Food and Restaurants
- Zest-O

== Poland ==
- AmRest
- Hortex
- Indykpol
- Kamis
- Maspex
- Tymbark
- Winiary

== Portugal ==
- Cerealis
- Cofaco
- Conservas Ramirez
- Delta Cafés
- Frulact
- Grupo RAR
- Lactogal
- Sovena Group
- Sumol + Compal
- Valouro

== Romania ==
- Aldis SRL
- European Drinks & Foods
- Recaș Wineries
- Sam Mills

== Russia ==
- Babayevsky
- Cherkizovo
- Inmarko
- Krasny Oktyabr
- Rot Front
- Wimm-Bill-Dann Foods

== Saudi Arabia ==
- Almarai
- Nadec
- Savola Group

== Serbia ==
- Bambi
- BIP Brewery
- Imlek a.d.
- Knjaz Miloš a.d.
- La Fantana
- Mlekara Subotica
- Nectar d.o.o.
- Rubin
- Štark
- Swisslion Group
- Zaječarsko pivo

== Singapore ==
- Aalst Chocolate
- ABR Holdings
- Asian Home Gourmet
- Ayam Brand
- Bee Cheng Hiang
- Bengawan Solo
- BreadTalk
- Delfi Limited
- Fraser and Neave
- Gardenia Foods
- Killiney Kopitiam
- Tee Yih Jia
- Udders
- Ya Kun Kaya Toast
- Yeo Hiap Seng
- Wilmar International

== South Korea ==
- Binggrae
- CJ Group
  - CJ CheilJedang
- Crown Confectionery
- Dongwon Industries
- Doosan Corporation
- Haitai
- Hollys
- Jeongin Food
- Korea Tobacco & Ginseng Corporation
- Lotte Corporation
  - Lotte Wellfood
- Nongshim
- Orion Confectionery
- Ottogi
- Pulmuone
- Samyang Food
- Seoul Milk
- SPC Group
- Sulbing
- Tory Food
- Yeolmae Food

== Spain ==
- BEHER
- Borges Mediterranean Group
- Calidad Pascual
- Campofrío Food Group
- Ebro Foods
- Galletas Gullón
- Grupo Calvo
- Kalise Menorquina
- Mahou-San Miguel Group
- Nutrexpa
- Pescanova
- Quely
- San Nicasio
- Ta-Tung

== Sri Lanka ==
- Cargills (Ceylon) PLC
- Ceylon Biscuits Limited
- Ceylon Cold Stores
- Daintee
- Harischandra Mills
- Maliban Biscuit Manufactories Limited
- Pelwatte Sugar Industries PLC

== Sweden ==
- AarhusKarlshamn
- Abba Seafood
- Arla Foods
- Cloetta
- Findus
- Gunnar Dafgård
- Lantmännen
- Mackmyra Whisky
- Norrmejerier
- Pågen
- Polarbröd
- Roberts
- Wasabröd

== Switzerland ==
- Barry Callebaut
- Bell Food Group
- Cailler
- Chiquita Brands International
- Coffee World
- Confiserie Sprüngli
- Coop
- Delica
- Emmi AG
- Franches-Montagnes Brewery
- Hero Group
- La Clandestine Absinthe
- Lindt & Sprüngli
- Max Felchlin
- Migros
- Nestlé
- Ricola
- Rivella
- Schweizer Getraenke AG, Obermeilen
- Tetra Laval
- Tropenhaus Frutigen
- Unser Bier
- Villars-Maitre-Chocolatier

== Taiwan ==
- Dachan Food
- HeySong Corporation
- Hsin Tung Yang
- Kimlan Foods
- Kuo Yuan Ye
- Ting Hsin International Group
- Tingyi (Cayman Islands) Holding Corporation
- Uni-President Enterprises Corporation
- Want Want
- Wei-Chuan Food Corporation

== Thailand ==
- Boon Rawd Brewery
- Charoen Pokphand Foods
- Dutch Mill
- Est Cola
- JKN Global Group
- Khon Kaen Sugar
- Minor International
- Mitr Phol
- Oishi Group
- Osotspa
- Red Bull
- Tao Kae Noi
- Thai President Foods
- Thai Union Group
- ThaiBev

== Trinidad and Tobago ==
- Bermudez Biscuit Company
- Carib Brewery
- Flavorite Ice Cream
- House of Angostura
- K.C. Confectionery Limited
- Kiss Baking Company Limited
- S. M. Jaleel and Company
- Solo Beverage Company

== Turkey ==
- A101
- Apikoğlu
- Banvit
- Efes Beverage Group
- Gulsan
- Mado
- TEKEL
- Tekel Birası
- Ülker
- Yıldız Holding

== Ukraine ==
- Chumak
- Khortytsia
- Konti Group
- Kremenchukm'yaso
- Nemiroff
- Obolon
- Roshen
- Sandora
- Svitoch
- Yarych Confectionery
- ZhL

== United Kingdom ==
- 2 Sisters Food Group
- A. E. Rodda & Son
- A.G. Barr
- A. L. Simpkin & Co. Ltd
- Antonelli Bros Ltd
- Associated British Foods
- Bakkavör
- Bates Dairy
- Baxters
- Ben's Cookies
- Benugo
- Bernard Matthews Ltd
- Bompas & Parr
- Booker Group
- Brace's Bakery
- Brains Brewery
- Britvic
- Burton's Biscuit Company
- Charbonnel et Walker
- Clark's Pies
- Co-op Food
- Compass Group
- Cook Trading
- Cooplands
- Cranswick plc
- Dairy Crest
- Delamere Dairy
- Devro
- Dietary Foods Ltd
- Divine Chocolate
- Druckers Vienna Patisserie
- F. Duerr & Sons
- Fiendish Feet
- First Milk
- Fivemiletown Creamery
- Fox's Confectionery
- Gelato Italia
- Ginsters
- Goldenfry
- Graze
- Greene King
- Grodzinski Bakery
- Gü
- Higgidy
- Hope and Greenwood
- Hovis
- HR Bradfords
- Irwin's Bakery
- Jordans
- Konditor & Cook
- Lion Capital LLP
- Lloyd Maunder
- Loch Duart
- Mackie's
- McCowan's
- Metcalfe's Food Company
- Michton
- Millie's Cookies
- Moo Free
- Mornflake
- Neal's Yard Dairy
- Oakhouse Foods
- Peter's Food Services
- Plum Baby
- Pork Farms
- Pukka Herbs
- Pukka Pies
- Premier Foods
- Princes Group
- Quiggin's
- R&R Ice Cream
- Rakusen's
- The Restaurant Group
- Riverford
- Roadchef
- Rowse Honey
- SABMiller
- Sainsbury's
- Samworth Brothers
- Sayers
- Scotty Brand Ltd
- Skinny Candy
- Slimming World
- Square Pie
- SSP Group
- Stoats Porridge Bars
- Swizzels Matlow
- Tangerine Confectionery
- Tate & Lyle
- Tesco
- Tunnock's
- Tyrrells
- Ummah Foods
- Unilever
- Vestey Group
- Waitrose
- Walkers' Nonsuch
- Walkers Shortbread
- Warburtons
- Warrens Bakery
- Welcome Break
- Whitbread
- Whitby Seafoods Ltd
- Wilkin & Sons
- William Jackson Food Group
- Wrights Pies
- Yeo Valley

== United States ==
=== Bakery ===
- Alvarado Street Bakery
- Arizmendi Bakery
- Avalon International Breads
- Big Apple Bagels
- Blue Chip Cookies
- Boudin Bakery
- Breadsmith
- Carlo's Bake Shop
- Cavanagh Company
- The Claxton Bakery
- Collin Street Bakery
- Crumbs Bake Shop
- Flowers Foods
- Great Harvest Bread Company
- Italian Peoples Bakery
- Joy Baking Group
- King's Hawaiian
- Kossar's Bialys
- Levain Bakery
- Liz Lovely
- Martin's Famous Pastry Shoppe, Inc.
- Mrs. Fields
- O&H Danish Bakery
- Orwasher's bakery
- Pillsbury Company
- Racine Danish Kringles
- Round Rock Donuts
- Schmidt Baking Company
- Semifreddi's Bakery
- Sprinkles Cupcakes
- Sunbeam Bread
- United States Bakery
- Voodoo Doughnut
- Westminster Cracker Company

=== Cereal & grain ===
- The Andersons
- Archer Daniels Midland
- Bob's Red Mill
- Bunge Limited
- Cargill
- CHS Inc.
- ContiGroup Companies
- Fuji Food
- Gavilon
- Kellogg's
- King Arthur Flour
- Kuli Kuli, Inc.
- The Leavitt Corporation
- Little Crow Foods
- Love Grown Foods
- Magnolia Bakery
- MFA Incorporated
- Peanut Butter & Co.
- POET
- Riceland Foods
- Two Degrees Food
- U.S. Mills
- United Cooperative

=== Confectionery ===
- Amano Artisan Chocolate
- American Licorice Company
- Annabelle Candy Company
- Askinosie Chocolate
- Boyer Brothers
- Brach's
- Brown and Haley
- Carolina Foods
- Chagrin Falls Popcorn Shop
- Chocolove
- Dagoba Chocolate
- Dan's Chocolates
- Dylan's Candy Bar
- Friesinger's Candies
- Georgetown Cupcake
- Gertrude Hawk Chocolates
- Giambri's Quality Sweets
- Goetze's Candy Company
- Guittard Chocolate Company
- The Hershey Company
- Idaho Candy Company
- Impact Confections
- Jelly Belly
- Joyva
- Just Born
- Marich Confectionery
- Mars, Incorporated
- Mast Brothers
- Mondelez International
- Reed's Candy
- Rocky Mountain Chocolate Factory
- Sanders Confectionery
- Sarris Candies
- Scharffen Berger Chocolate Maker
- Schimpff's Confectionery
- See's Candies
- Smarties Candy Company
- Spangler Candy Company
- Taza Chocolate
- TCHO
- Unreal Brands
- The Warrell Corporation
- Whetstone Chocolates
- Whitman's

=== Dairy ===
- All American Foods
- Alpenrose Dairy
- Aurora Organic Dairy
- BelGioioso Cheese
- Bittersweet Plantation Dairy
- Blue Bell Creameries
- Brewster Dairy
- Byrne Dairy
- Cabot Creamery
- Cal-Maine
- Cass-Clay
- Chaseholm Farm Creamery
- Clover Stornetta Farms
- Cowgirl Creamery
- Crystal Creamery
- Cypress Point Creamery
- Dairy Farmers of America
- Darigold
- DCI Cheese Company
- Dean Foods
- Ellsworth Cooperative Creamery
- Galliker's
- Gossner Foods
- Grafton Village Cheese Company
- Happy Cow Creamery
- Hershey Creamery Company
- Hilmar Cheese Company
- Horizon Organic
- HP Hood
- Joseph Gallo Farms
- Junket
- Land O'Lakes
- Leprino Foods
- Lifeway Foods
- Marin French Cheese Company
- Maytag Dairy Farms
- Murray's Cheese
- Nature's Harmony Farm
- Organic Valley
- Penn State University Creamery
- Pierre's Ice Cream Company
- Point Reyes Farmstead Cheese Company
- Prairie Farms Dairy
- Rogue Creamery
- Sargento
- Schoep's Ice Cream
- Schreiber Foods
- Shamrock Farms
- Siggi's Dairy
- Smiling Hill Farm
- SmithFoods
- Straus Family Creamery
- Sunshine Dairy
- Sweet Grass Dairy
- Tillamook County Creamery Association
- United Dairy Farmers
- Vermont Creamery
- Wainwright Dairy
- Winchester Cheese Company
- Winder Farms
- Wisconsin Cheeseman
- Yancey's Fancy
- Yarnell Ice Cream Co.

=== Drink ===
- Brown-Forman
- Monarch Beverage Company
- Zevia

=== Foods distribution & retail ===
- Albertsons
- Dollar General
- Dollar Tree
- Food Lion
- The Giant Company
- The Home Depot
- Kroger
- Lowe's
- Macy's, Inc.
- Publix
- Reyes Holdings
- Saladino's Inc
- SuperValu
- Target Corporation
- Walgreens Boots Alliance
- Walmart
- Winn Dixie

=== Foods processing (not frozen) ===
- Bruce Foods
- Catterton Partners
- Cherrybrook Kitchen
- Colavita
- Cuisine Solutions
- Deep Foods
- Eden Foods Inc.
- General Mills
- Goya Foods
- Hormel Foods
- Ingredion
- Isaly's
- Kraft Heinz
- Krinos Foods
- Kronos Foods
- La Loma Foods
- Luck's Incorporated
- Manischewitz
- Newman's Own
- Rhee Bros., Inc.
- Richelieu Foods
- Rosa Food
- Sclafani Foods
- Seneca Foods
- Streit's
- Tabatchnick

=== Frozen foods ===
- Bellisio Foods
- Captain Ken's Foods
- Edwards Baking
- Fred's Frozen Foods
- Mrs. T's Pierogies
- Pero Family Farms Food Company
- Reser's Fine Foods
- Rhino Foods
- Rich Products
- Ruiz Foods
- Schwan Food Company
- Tyson Foods

=== Fruits & vegetables processing ===
- The Bauman Family
- Blue Diamond Growers
- Buddy Fruits
- Calavo Growers
- Del Monte
- Dole Food Company
- Driscoll's
- Franklin Baker Company
- Frieda's Inc.
- Hollandia Produce
- Limoneira
- Maui Pineapple Company
- The Morning Star Company
- Ocean Spray
- Organically Grown Company
- Pero Family Farms Food Company
- Simple and Crisp
- Sunkist Growers, Incorporated
- Taylor Farms
- Turbana
- Wish Farms

=== Meats processing ===
- Boar's Head Provision Company
- Burgers' Smokehouse
- Columbus Salame
- Dakota Beef
- Daniele, Inc.
- D'Artagnan
- Dietz & Watson
- Empire Kosher
- Foster Farms
- Hatfield Quality Meats
- Heritage Foods USA
- Hormel Foods
- Kansas City Steak Company
- Kiolbassa Sausage
- Koch Foods
- Koegel Meat Company
- Lobel's of New York
- Marathon Enterprises, Inc.
- Molinari's
- National Beef Packing Company
- Niman Ranch
- Norbest
- Nueske's Applewood Smoked Meats
- Omaha Steaks
- Parker House Sausage Company
- Pat LaFrieda Meat Purveyors
- Perdue Farms
- Plumrose USA
- Robertson's Hams
- Tallgrass Beef Company
- Tyson Foods
- Usinger's
- Zacky Farms

=== Restaurant ===
- Chipotle Mexican Grill
- Domino's Pizza
- McDonald's
- Starbucks
- The Wendy's Company
- Yum! Brands

=== Snack foods ===
- Axium Foods
- Blair's Sauces and Snacks
- Casa Sanchez Foods
- Charles Chips
- Elmer's Fine Foods
- General Mills
- Golden Flake
- Hain Celestial Group
- J & J Snack Foods
- Jel Sert
- Kellogg's
- Kraft Heinz
- Martin's Potato Chips
- McCormick & Company
- McKee Foods
- Mike-sell's
- Mrs. Fisher's
- Oberto Sausage Company
- Old Dutch Foods
- Robert's American Gourmet Food
- Rudolph Foods
- Shearer's Foods
- Snak King
- Snyder's-Lance
- Thanasi Foods
- Utz Quality Foods
- Wise Foods
- Wyandot Snacks

=== Spices & condiments ===
- Badia Spices
- Basic Food Flavors
- Crystal Hot Sauce
- Dave's Gourmet
- Dog-Gone Sauce
- Frank's RedHot
- French's
- Frontier Natural Products Co-op
- Gold Pure Food Products Co.
- Herlocher Foods
- Huy Fong Foods
- J&D's Down Home Enterprises
- The J.M. Smucker Company
- McCormick & Company
- Mezzetta
- Mrs. Cubbison's Foods
- Mt. Olive Pickle Company
- Odell's
- Plochman's
- Pompeian, Inc.
- Pure Indian Foods
- Reily Foods Company
- Silver Spring Foods
- Solo Foods
- Tabasco sauce
- Tapatío hot sauce
- Texas Pete
- Urban Accents
- Wickles
- Wing-Time

=== Sugar refining ===
- Amalgamated Sugar Company
- American Crystal Sugar Company
- American Sugar Refining
- Michigan Sugar
- Seaboard Corporation
- Spreckels Sugar Company
- US Sugar Corporation
- Western Sugar Cooperative

=== Worldwide ===
- Campbell's
- The Coca-Cola Company
- Conagra Brands
- Dairy Queen
- Domino's
- Dunkin' Donuts
- General Mills
- The Hershey Company
- Inspire Brands
- Kellogg's
- Keurig Dr Pepper
- Kraft Heinz
- Krispy Kreme
- Mars, Incorporated
- McDonald's
- Mondelez International
- PepsiCo
- Post Holdings
- Starbucks
- Subway
- The Wendy's Company
- Yum! Brands

== Venezuela ==
- Alimentos La Giralda
- Chocolates El Rey
- Empresas Polar

== Vietnam ==
- An Giang Coffee
- Bien Hoa Sugar
- Cuulong Fish
- Habeco (Hanoi Beer)
- Hai Ha Confectionery
- Hanoimilk
- Highlands Coffee
- Huda Beer
- Hue Beer
- Kinh Do Corporation
- Sabeco (Saigon Beer)
- Trung Nguyên
- Vinacafe
- Vinamilk

== See also ==
- List of bakeries
- List of brand name food products
- List of food cooperatives
