= HHC =

HHC may refer to:

== Organizations ==
- Hai Ha Confectionery, confectionery company in Vietnam
- Headquarters and headquarters company (United States), a type of military unit in the U.S. Army
- Hendricks Holding Company, privately held conglomerate in Beloit, Wisconsin
- Hilton Hotels Corporation, the former entity of Hilton Worldwide Holdings Inc. in the United States
- Hip Hop Congress, an organization encouraging the growth of hip hop culture
- Hungarian Helsinki Committee, a non-governmental human rights organization based in Budapest, Hungary
- HipHopCanada, a hip-hop publishing company based in Toronto, Canada

== Structures ==
- Harlem Hospital Center, public teaching hospital affiliated with Columbia University
- New York City Health and Hospitals Corporation, a public hospital and clinic group in New York City

== Other uses ==
- Hague Hijacking Convention, the convention for suppression of unlawful seizure of aircraft.
- HHC Hardenberg, a Dutch football club
- Hexahydrocannabinol, a cannabinoid derivative
- Hereditary hemochromatosis, a genetic mutation that causes iron accumulation
- Hill hold control, a mechanism used to assist start-up of automobiles on inclines
- Hip Hop Connection, hip-hop magazine
