= Chaoda Modern Agriculture =

Chaoda Modern Agriculture (Holdings) Limited 超大現代農業(控股)有限公司
- Company type: Publicly owned company
- Traded as: SEHK: 682
- Industry: agricultural products
- Founded: 1997
- Headquarters: Fuzhou, Fujian, People's Republic of China
- Area served: People's Republic of China
- Key people: Mr. Kwok Ho (CEO)
- Website: www.chaoda.com.hk

Chaoda Modern Agriculture (Holdings) Limited is a publicly owned company in the production and distribution of ecologically grown vegetables and other agricultural products. It is headquartered in Fuzhou, Fujian province, China.

Chaoda was started in 1994 by Kwok Ho, after initial business interests with the People's Liberation Army.

Chaoda was listed on the Hong Kong Stock Exchange in 2000.

Chaoda is listed on the OTCQB Markets.

== Suspicion of Fraud ==
During 2011, it was the subject of various allegations of fraud and of insider trading by its executives, which have resulted in heavy falls in its share price. In February 2015, Chaoda started to trade again on the SEHK.

== Business ==
The company exports a variety of vegetables such as Bell Peppers, Broccoli, Carrot, Cauliflower, Cherry Tomato, Chinese Cabbage, Chinese Radish, Choi Sum, Cucumber, Eggplant, Hot Peppers, Iceberg Lettuce, Loquat, Melon, Onion, Potato, Pumpkin, Sugar Snap Peas, Summer Squash, Sweet Corn, Sweet Potato, Tangerine, Watermelon and Welsh Onion.

== See also ==
- List of food companies
