= Lobel's of New York =

American online butcher shop

- Industry: Food
- Founded: 1840
- Headquarters: 1096 Madison Ave., New York, NY 10028
- Area served: United States
- Key people: Stanley Lobel
- Products: Beef products
- Website: www.lobels.com

Lobel's of New York is an online American butcher shop. Operated by members of the Lobel family, the company traces its roots to Morris Lobel, an Austrian-American immigrant who operated several physical butcher shops in New York City. It currently offers expensive meat and promotes itself through celebrity endorsements.

Fourth-generation butcher Leon Lobel died in 2006, passing ownership to his younger brother Stanley, his son Evan, and nephews, Mark and David Lobel. The sixth generation of family butchers entered the business in 2018: Mark's son, Brian Lobel; and Evan's daughter, Joanna "Joey" Lobel.

Since 2009, Lobel's has also sold meat in sandwiches at Yankee Stadium.

== See also ==
- List of food companies
- List of brand name food products
