= Sandora =

Ukrainian beverage and food company

Sandora LLC
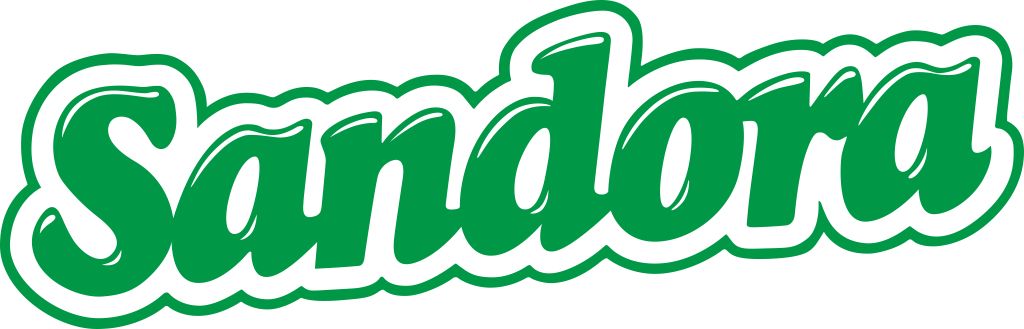
- Native name: ТОВ «Сандора»
- Type: LLC
- Industry: Beverages, Food industry
- Founded: 1995
- Founders: Serhiy Sypko, Ihor Bezzub, Raymondas Tumenas
- Headquarters: Mykolaivske, Mykolaiv Oblast, Ukraine
- Area served: Ukraine and ~20 export countries
- Products: Juice, nectar, carbonated drinks, iced tea, snacks
- Brands: Sandora, Sadochok, Pepsi, 7UP, Mirinda, Lipton Ice Tea, KhrumTeam, Lay's
- Revenue: ▲ ₴13.3 billion (2025)
- Net income: ₴845 million (2025)
- Total assets: ₴8.53 billion (2025)
- Owner: PepsiCo
- Number of employees: 2,399 (2025)
- Website: www.pepsico.ua

Sandora LLC (Ukrainian: ТОВ «Сандора») is a Ukrainian food and beverage company based in Mykolaiv Oblast, Ukraine. Founded in 1995 by entrepreneurs Serhiy Sypko, Ihor Bezzub, and Raymondas Tumenas, it is one of Ukraine's largest producers of juices, nectars, soft drinks, and snacks. Since 2007, Sandora has been a subsidiary of PepsiCo and serves as the corporation's primary operating entity in Ukraine.

Sandora operates two major production complexes in Mykolaiv Oblast—in the villages of Mykolaivske and Mishkovo-Pohorilove. In addition to its flagship juice brands (including Sandora and Sadochok), the company bottles carbonated soft drinks and iced tea (Pepsi, 7UP, Mirinda, Lipton Ice Tea) and manufactures snacks (Lay's, KhrumTeam). Its products are sold across Ukraine and exported to approximately 20 countries. As of 2025, the company employed 2,399 people.

== History ==
In 1995, Lithuanian businessmen Ihor Bezzub and Raymondas Tumenas provided start-up capital to implement a business plan developed by Serhiy Sypko, a lecturer at the Mykolaiv University of Shipbuilding. In the newly established company, Bezzub and Tumenas each held a 45% stake, while Sypko held 10%. Production commenced the following year at an acquired plant in the village of Mykolaivske, and in 2000, a fruit puree and semi-finished products workshop was launched. In 2006, Sandora built Production Complex No. 2 in the village of Mishkovo-Pohorilove for packaging beverages in PET and Tetra Pak formats; by the end of that year, the company held a 45.6% share of the Ukrainian juice market.

In 2007, one of the largest fast-moving consumer goods (FMCG) transactions in Ukraine took place when PepsiCo acquired Sandora in a deal valued at US$678 million. In September 2007, PepsiCo purchased an 80% stake, and in November 2007, PepsiAmericas and PepsiCo jointly acquired the remaining 20% (leaving PepsiAmericas with 60% and PepsiCo with 40%). Following PepsiCo's acquisition of PepsiAmericas in 2010, PepsiCo assumed 100% ownership of Sandora.

Subsequent investments enabled Sandora to diversify beyond juices and expand seasonal fruit and vegetable processing. In 2008, production of Lipton Ice Tea began at the Mishkovo-Pohorilove plant, followed in 2009–2010 by bottling lines for Pepsi and 7UP. In 2014, the company launched a snack production line for KhrumTeam croutons and began producing Mirinda, and in 2019 it started manufacturing Lay's potato chips.

=== Russian invasion of Ukraine ===
Following the start of the Russian invasion of Ukraine on 24 February 2022, PepsiCo halted production at Sandora's facilities in Mykolaiv Oblast due to security concerns. In March 2022, Mykolaiv Mayor Oleksandr Sienkevych reported that the Sandora plant had been targeted by looters, and during the Battle of Mykolaiv, the facilities sustained significant damage from Russian shelling. Sales of Sandora juices resumed in late 2022 via imports from PepsiCo plants in Romania and Poland, while Sandora's domestic market share temporarily declined in favor of local competitors such as Vitmark and Halychyna.

Domestic production partially resumed in March 2023 and officially restarted in May 2023 after four production lines were relocated from Mykolaiv Oblast to Vyshneve in Kyiv Oblast.

On 30 August 2026, PepsiCo reported that a Russian military strike hit Sandora's production facilities in Mykolaiv Oblast where Pepsi and Lipton Ice Tea were manufactured.<ref name="

== See also ==
- List of food companies
