= Canyon Creek Food Company =

Canadian food processing company

- Industry: Food - major diversified
- Founded: 1995
- Headquarters: Edmonton, Alberta, Canada
- Key people: Terence Alty, CEO, Brian Halina, Chairman
- Products: Fresh soups and sauces
- Number of employees: 50 (2010)
- Website: http://www.canyoncreekfood.com

Canyon Creek Food Company (TSX-V: CYF) is a food processing company based in Edmonton, Alberta. It produces refrigerated soups and side dishes for grocery retailers under their own store brands. This company also supplies commercial and institutional customers such as restaurant chains and health-care facilities.

== History ==
Canyon Creek Soup Company was started in December 1995 by David Vaughan and Dale Cook as a fresh soup company located in Edmonton. In 1996, the company went public on the TSX Venture Exchange under the name Canyon Creek Food Company. In 2001, majority shareholder Brian Halina took over the position of CEO as well as maintaining his position as chairman of the board.

In 2003 Brian Halina stepped down as CEO but maintained his position of chairman of the board. Terence Alty was named CEO and president of the company. The head office was then moved to Calgary, with the plant remaining in Edmonton.

In January 2016, the company entered the U.S. market.

== See also ==
- List of food companies
- Soup
