= Basic Food Flavors =

American food ingredients manufacturer

Coordinates: 36.24085°N 115.08761°W

Basic Food Flavors, Inc. is a private company based in North Las Vegas, Nevada, United States. Established in 1980, they have developed a line of hydrolyzed vegetable protein (HVP), soy sauce and soy base products. It produces 120 varieties of HVP which are used in various products including chips, soups, dressings and snack foods. A private company which does not make financial information public, its annual sales have been estimated as between $20 and $50 million.

On March 4, 2010, the United States Food and Drug Administration announced it was conducting an investigation after a customer of Basic Food Flavors reported finding Salmonella in one production lot of HVP. Affected bulk, ready-to-eat and ready-to-cook HVP products were recalled in the U.S. and Canada. The recall resulted in 177 products being removed from grocery shelves.

About 1990, the company moved to Nevada from Pomona, California, complaining that California's economic regulations were too strict and expensive.

== See also ==
- List of food companies
