= Flavorite Ice Cream =

Ice cream manufacturer in Trinidad and Tobago

- Company type: Public (TTSE: FFL)
- Industry: Food
- Founded: 1970
- Headquarters: San Juan, Trinidad and Tobago
- Products: Ice Creams
- Number of employees: ~500
- Website: flavoritefoodstt.com

Flavorite Ice Cream is one of the leading commercial ice cream manufacturers in Trinidad and Tobago. It was formed in 1970 by Vernon Charles. It is also known as Flavorite Foods as well. It is located at Boundary Road, San Juan, Trinidad. It was distributed to retail outlets and also exported to other Caribbean Islands as well. Flavorite Foods acquired Romike Ltd in 2012.

The company is publicly traded and listed on the Trinidad and Tobago Stock Exchange (code: FFL).

== See also ==
- List of food companies
