= Deep Foods =

American family-owned and operated manufacturer of Indian foods

Deep Foods, Inc.
- Industry: Food Service, Consumer Packaged Goods
- Founded: 1977
- Headquarters: Union, New Jersey, United States
- Area served: nationwide
- Key people: Bhagwati Amin (Founder), Arvind Amin (Former CEO), Deep Amin (Current CEO)
- Products: Indian foods
- Number of employees: Approximately 1,800 (as of 2010)
- Website: www.deepfoods.com

Deep Foods is an Indian food manufacturer based in Union Township, Union County, New Jersey.

== History ==
It was founded in 1977 by Bhagwati Amin after the Gujarati delicacies she made became popular among her neighborhood families and local grocers. To meet the growing demand, Bhagwati and her husband, Arvind, began working on what is today Deep Foods Inc. They established a factory in Lyndhurst, NJ and named their company after their son, Deepak. In 1981, Arvind resigned from his accounting job to assist Bhagwati full time at Deep Foods.

As the population of Indian Americans increased, so did the demand for their products. They are currently one of the largest Indian food brands in the US. As of 2024, around 20,000 stores carried their products, and Bhagwati's son Deepak is the CEO.

== Products ==
Their first product was Hot Mix, which The New York Times described as "a spicy Indian trail mix of fried noodles made from chickpea flour and tossed with cashews, pistachios and spices".

The company specializes in frozen prepared Indian foods. The company also produces products such as frozen vegetarian naan pizzas, which are produced entirely in India, and 14 flavors of ice cream.

Around 2009, they launched their Tandoor Chef line of frozen food products, designed to appeal to non-Indian customers. Ten years later, they rebranded Tandoor Chef into Deep Indian Kitchen.

The company obtained Halal certification for its frozen chicken and lamb products in 2012.

In 2021, their chicken vindaloo was declared "Best Frozen Dinner" by People.

== Restaurant ==
They launched a fast-casual restaurant chain in New York City in 2015, which offers a Chipotle-style ordering menu for Indian cuisine. The restaurants were previously called Indikitch and were rebranded to Deep Indian Kitchen in 2019. In 2020, they opened a location in Union, New Jersey.

== See also ==
- List of food companies
