= Tabatchnick =

American food company

Tabatchnick Fine Foods official logo

Tabatchnick (/təˈbætʃnɪk/ tə-BATCH-nik) is a soup manufacturer based in Somerset, New Jersey, USA. It was founded by Louis Tabatchnick of Newark, New Jersey. He started a chain of restaurants in 1895, followed by the company in 1905.

== See also ==
- List of food companies
