= All American Foods =

American food company

All American Foods, Inc.
- Company type: Private
- Industry: Food additives
- Founded: 1987; 39 years ago
- Founder: Jeff Thom
- Headquarters: Mankato, Minnesota, United States
- Key people: Jeff Thom (Founder Chairman), Connie Stokman (CEO and President)
- Products: Pro Mix line of dairy and non-dairy food ingredients, including cheese powder, egg replacers, high fat powder and dried flavouring
- Services: Food Ingredients and Custom Processing
- Website: www.aafoods.com

All American Foods (AAFI) is an American food ingredient manufacturer, headquartered in Mankato, Minnesota.

AAFI operates four manufacturing facilities in Southern Minnesota that produce over 100 dairy and non-dairy food ingredients for human consumption. AAFI produces ingredients for bakery, confectionery, soups and sauce, and flavor applications. All American Foods also provides custom toll processing and packaging of food ingredients.

== History ==
All American Foods was founded in 1987 by Jeff Thom in Mankato, Minnesota. By 2000 its 14 acre Mankato, MN campus includes three large manufacturing facilities.

In 2000, All American acquired Waseca Foods, which expanded their capacity and processing capabilities. Today, its Pro Mix line of value added food ingredients are used nationwide in a variety of applications.

== Recognition ==
In 2008, Jeff Thom, CEO of All American Foods, Inc. was named Business Person of the Year by Connect Magazine.

== See also ==
- List of food companies
