= Moo Free =

British manufacturer of dairy free, gluten free, vegan and organic chocolates

Moo Free Ltd
- Type: Private Limited Company
- Industry: Chocolate
- Founded: 2010; 16 years ago
- Founder: Mike Jessop; Andrea Jessop
- Headquarters: Holsworthy, United Kingdom
- Website: moofreechocolates.com

Moo Free Ltd. is a British manufacturer of dairy free, gluten free, vegan and organic chocolates. Their head office is located in Holsworthy, Devon, England. The company was established in 2010 by husband and wife team Mike and Andrea Jessop with the intent of making a dairy free chocolate with a taste similar to that of milk chocolate by using rice milk instead of conventional dairy milk. The concept was to ensure that vegan children, those with food allergies or intolerance, and children on the autism spectrum (who often cannot eat certain things for medical reasons) could have traditional seasonal chocolates such as Easter eggs and Advent calendars. In addition to being vegan, the company's products are also free from dairy, gluten, wheat and soya, and are made from organically certified ingredients.

The company's range includes a variety of bars, bags of chocolates and seasonal products, including Advent Calendars and Easter Eggs.

== Awards ==
=== Product Awards ===
The company's products have received a number of awards and commendations, including 'Best Sweets or Cakes' and 'Best Vegan Chocolates' in the Vegfest Awards 2011, 2012, 2013, 2014, 2016 and 2018 and the FreeFrom Food Awards Ireland 2016 - 'Best Free From Chocolate'.

=== Business Awards ===
Moo Free have received several business awards over the years including the Food & Drink Federation's (FDF) - 'Growth Business Award' and The Queen's Award For Enterprise: International Trade 2016.
