= Jeongin Food =

South Korean food company

Jeongin Food (Korean: 정인식품) is a South Korean company headquartered in Busan, South Korea. Established in 1998, the company is known to manufacture varieties of nurungji (누룽지); which is a traditional Korean food made of scorched rice.

== Trade ==
The company exports its products to the United States, Canada, Japan, China, Taiwan, Hong Kong, other Asian-Pacific nations, Europe, and other nations worldwide.

== Products ==
- Fast Nurungji (즉석 누룽지)
- Environ Nurungji (친환경 누룽지)
- Rice Nurungji (찹쌀 누룽지)
- Black Rice Nurungji (흑미 누룽지)

== See also ==
- Nurungji
- Economy of South Korea
