= Sulbing =

South Korean dessert cafe chain

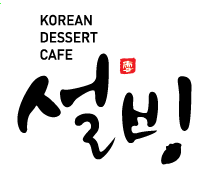
- Industry: Dessert, drink
- Founded: South Korea (2013)
- Headquarters: Seoul, South Korea
- Number of locations: 490+ stores (2014)
- Website: Official website

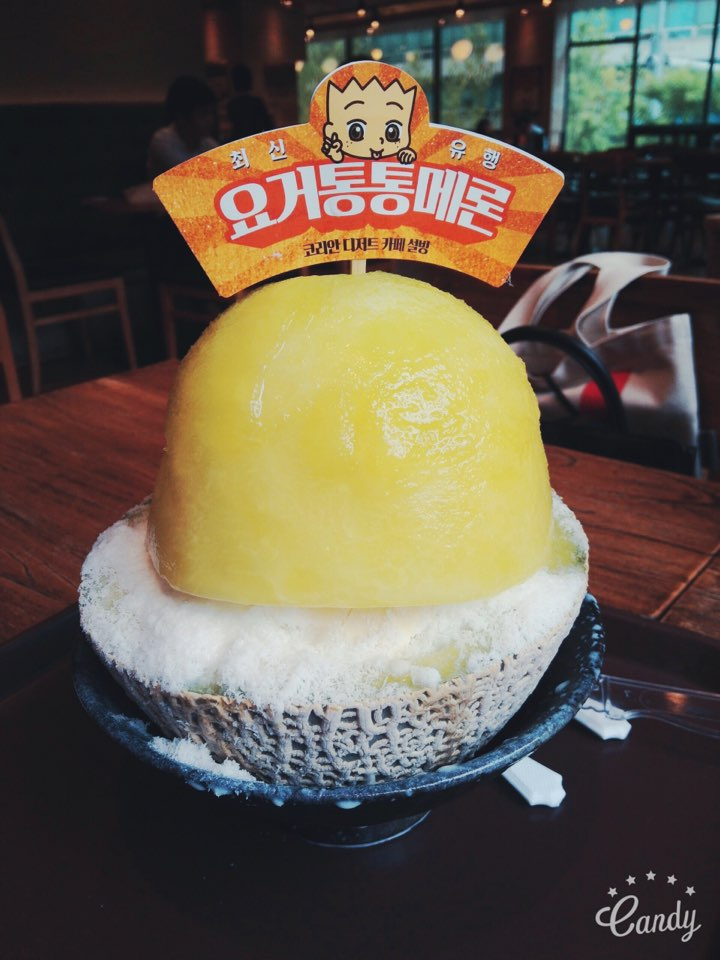
Melon favor in Sulbing

Sulbing (Korean: 설빙), is a dessert cafe chain based in South Korea. As of 2014, the chain had over 490 retail stores in South Korea. It serves mainly various flavors of bingsu (Korean shaved ice).

== History ==
The brand first started in 2010 as a fusion rice cake cafe called "Siroo(시루)" located in Busan by founder Jung Sun hee(정선희), and the first menu they developed was a bingsu that used Injeolmi called "Injeolmi Sulbing" that was first made in 2013. Jung officially launched the brand using the popularity of the dish, which gained popularity for breaking the boundaries of what bingsoo is, which was traditionally paired more with red beans. In 2018, Sulbing launched its delivery service.
