= Herlocher Foods =

American mustard manufacturer

- Industry: Food processing
- Headquarters: State College, Pennsylvania, United States
- Owner: Charles C. Herlocher
- Website: herlocherfoods.com

Herlocher Foods is the sole manufacturer of Herlocher's Dipping Mustard. The mustard was created by Charles C. Herlocher I from an old family recipe for the Train Station Restaurant in State College, Pennsylvania in the 1970s. Herlocher's Dipping Mustard became a coast-to-coast deli condiment staple in 1992, when Charles C. Herlocher II took over the nationwide distribution.

== History ==
In February 1978, at the Train Station Restaurant in State College, Pennsylvania, the mustard dip and pretzel combination was becoming popular with regulars. Customers throughout the Northeast sent checks requesting Herlocher's Dipping Mustard once it became available to "take-out".

Expansion began as popularity grew and Herlocher's Dipping Mustard became available throughout the east coast.

In 1997, Herlocher's Penn State Dipping Mustard was introduced and became a wildly popular tailgate item.

== Products ==
Herlocher's Dipping Mustard comes in several different labels and sizes packaged in glass jars: 8 oz regular labels and 14.5 oz NCAA Penn State and Ohio State labels.
