= Simple and Crisp =

American food company

Simple & Crisp
- Founded: 2012
- Headquarters: Seattle, Washington, USA
- Products: Dried fruit
- Owner: Jane Yuan
- Website: simpleandcrisp.com

Simple & Crisp is a dried fruit company in Seattle, Washington that produces and sells "artisanal" dried apple, orange, pear and blood orange crackers.

== History ==
Simple & Crisp was founded by Jane Yuan, a former publicist and marketing consultant. Yuan launched the company in late 2012.

The gluten-free fruit crackers created by Simple & Crisp are intended to be used as a pairing to foods such as cheese and desserts or garnishes to beverages such as champagne or cocktails.

The product is stocked at national retailers such as Whole Foods Market, Williams Sonoma and Dean & DeLuca.
