= Pure Indian Foods =

Ghee manufacturer and distributor

- Company type: Private
- Founded: 2008
- Founder: Sandeep and Nalini Agarwal
- Headquarters: Princeton Junction, New Jersey
- Website: www.pureindianfoods.com

Pure Indian Foods is an organic, grass-fed herbal and spiced ghee manufacturer and distributor headquartered in Princeton Junction, New Jersey. The company was founded by Sandeep Agarwal and his wife, Nalini, in 2008.

== History ==
Pure Indian Foods is based out of Princeton, New Jersey and owned by husband and wife team, Sandeep and Nalini Agarwal. In 1889, Nalini’s family founded a ghee business in northern India. In 2008, the Agarwals established Pure Indian Foods to continue his family business in the United States. Previously, Sandeep worked as an IT specialist on Wall Street.

In 2012, the company began shipping to Canada. That October, Pure Indian Foods won two awards at the American Herbalist Guild Symposium. The Whole Earth Center was the first store to carry the company’s ghee; later stores included Whole Foods Market and Amazon.

In 2019, Agarwal won the Caspar Wistar Award for Growth. He is also the founder of Butterworld, a traveling exhibition that highlights unique, rare, and historical dairy artifacts from around the world.

Pure Indian Foods is a member of the Specialty Food Association. The Paleo diet also now endorses Pure Indian Foods ghee as a part of the lifestyle.

== Operations ==
Pure Indian Foods is based in Princeton Junction, New Jersey. The company uses cream from free-ranging dairy herds in New Jersey for their products. Additionally, Pure Indian Foods uses non-homogenized milk in the spring and fall when grass grows rapidly to give its products a high amount of fat-soluble vitamins and Conjugated Linoleic Acid (CLA). Pure Indian Foods produces ghee, butter with the milk solids and water removed, in multiple variations including digestive, garlic, herbes de provence, Indian dessert, Italian and Niter Kebbeh.

== Products ==
In addition to offering traditional ghee, oils, and spices, Pure Indian Foods has several products designed for specific uses.

- Coffee++, a MCT oil and grass-fed ghee product to make oiled coffee.
- Brahmi Ghee, a blend of cultured, grass-fed, organic ghee and organic Brahmi, used for blending into warm water and designed to enhance memory and sleep.
- Indian Dessert Ghee, flavored with fennel, cardamom, and saffron.
- Ayurvedic Foods, a selection of herbal coffee supplements, organic mung dal, ayurvedic ghee products, and a variety of organic teas; these products are designed to balance the elements of the body.
