= IFAD Group =

Bangladeshi conglomerate

- Type: Private
- Industry: Automobile, Information Technology, Healthcare, Manufacturing, Commerce
- Founder: Iftekhar Ahmed Tipu
- Website: www.ifadgroup.com

IFAD Group (Bengali: ইফাদ গ্রুপ) is a massive industrial conglomerate in Bangladesh. It operates in various sectors including agriculture, engineering, construction, petrochemicals, and technology services. The group is headquartered in Dhaka, the capital of Bangladesh. It was established in 1985 and has made significant contributions to the economy of Bangladesh since its inception.

== History ==
IFAD Group was established in 1985. Since its founding, it has achieved rapid improvement in the agricultural and industrial sectors and is recognized as one of the largest industrial groups in Bangladesh. The group is active in agricultural technology, farm machinery, food processing, petrochemicals, construction, and other industries. IFAD Group was founded by Iftekhar Ahmed Tipu.

== Companies ==
- IFAD Auto Services Limited: Focuses on auto service, car sales, and repair.
- IFAD Information and Technology Limited: Focuses on information technology and software development.
- IFAD Home Care Limited: Focuses on home services and healthcare.
- IFAD Multi Products Limited: Focuses on product manufacturing and commerce.
- IFAD Autos PLC: Focuses on autos and car sales.

== Other initiatives ==
IFAD Film Club

- Field: Cultural activities, Film.
- Description: The IFAD Film Club works towards the development of the Bangladeshi film industry. It organizes the IFAD Film Club Award, which is a significant initiative to introduce the country's film industry to the international stage. It assists in improving the quality of Bangladeshi films and strengthening the position of the country's films in the global arena.
