= All Joy Foods =

South African manufacturer of condiments

All Joy Foods Limited is a South African manufacturer of condiments and tomato sauce. The company was founded in 1987 by Marci Pather after he successfully raised R135 thousand. Its first plant was opened in Newtown, a suburb of Johannesburg, and its first product was tomato sauce. All Joy is South Africa's second-largest producer of tomato sauces.

All Joy Foods is listed on the Johannesburg Stock Exchange and its main office is in Johannesburg. As of October 2005, it had a turnover of R220 million.
