= Irwin's Bakery =

Northern Ireland's largest independent bakery

Irwin's is Northern Ireland’s largest independent bakery and supplies a range of traditional Irish breads to supermarkets throughout the United Kingdom and Ireland. Founded in Portadown in County Armagh in 1912, as of 2017 the company reportedly had 337 employees and a turnover of approximately £29 million.

The business was originally founded by W.D. Irwin as a grocery retailer. His wife and sister-in-law were home-bakers, who began to bake cakes and bakery items for the shop. Additional bakers were later employed to cope with the increasing trade. In 1965, Irwin's launched Nutty Krust, a brand of plain or batch bread which went on to become "one of Northern Ireland's most popular grocery products". The company is still owned by the Irwin family.

25% of Irwin's products are sold in Great Britain, 12% in Ireland and the rest is sold in Northern Ireland. The company has reportedly been "steadily increasing the popularity of Irish bread products" in Britain.
