= Unser Bier =

Brewery in Basel, Switzerland

Coordinates: 47.5405°N 7.5927°E

- Interactive map of Unser Bier
- Location: Basel, CH
- Opened: 1997
- Annual production volume: 6,000 hectolitres (5,100 US bbl)
- Owned by: Unser Bier AG

Active beers
Name	Type
Naturblond	Pale ale
Weizen	Wheat beer
Schwarzbier	Porter
Amber	Lager

Seasonal beers
Name	Type
Drummler	Pilsner
Weihnachts-Bier	Bock

Unser Bier is a small local brewery in Basel, Switzerland.

Unser Bier is most widely known for its amber beer, a simple lager. They also produce a wheat beer (Weizen) and a pale ale (Natur Blond) and a dark porter style beer (Schwarz Bier), as well as a number of specialty and seasonal beers such as a Christmas beer and the "Meister" beer, produced when the FC Basel football team wins the national championship. 2010 the brewery moved to the Gundeldinger Feld and invested 5 million Swiss francs to enlarge its capacity and for a new bottling station.

On May 6, 2006, Unser Bier become the biggest brewery in Basel following the merger of Ziegelhof with Eichhof.
