= Bates Dairy =

- Company type: Ltd.
- Industry: Dairy products
- Founded: 1939
- Headquarters: Southport, United Kingdom
- Area served: Merseyside, Wirral and Lancashire
- Products: Milk, cream, butter, cheese, yoghurts, eggs, bread, juice, soft drinks
- Website: batesdairy.co.uk

Bates Dairy is a large family run dairy based in Southport, Merseyside, which has been delivering milk to homes since 1939. It delivers milk to over 10,000 customers and is one of the oldest dairies in the area.

Bates Dairy is one of the largest independent dairies in Britain, with over 20 electric milk floats, most of them built by Ross in the 1970s and 1980s. Bates also owns a specially converted Morrison Marsden milk float with many different compartments, for use in Southport centre.

In April 2014, Bates upgraded most of its equipment, making it one of the most hygienic dairies in Merseyside. The company employs over 90 staff in a variety of roles including delivery, sales, administration and processing.

One of its biggest customers is TJ Morris Ltd, which owns the Home Bargains chain of discount stores. The company also supplies its milk to the Modern Milkman, a business that sells fresh milk to consumers and that has a focus on sustainability.

One of the companies milkmen received a Your Heroes award for helping to save a customer who had collapsed, whilst on his milk round and during the COVID-19 pandemic, Bates Dairy organised a convoy of milk floats to visit Southport Hospital, to show respect to NHS workers involved in treating people impacted.

In 2021, Sefton Council approved plans that allowed Bates Dairy to build a new dairy building to be used for milk bottle washing and filling. This followed the council agreeing to sell the dairy land, subject to them gaining planning permission. Three years later, the company was involved in purchasing four further sites, when the owners of another dairy in the region retired.
