= Ta-Tung =

Food company in Catalonia, Spain

Ta-Tung Platos Precocinados
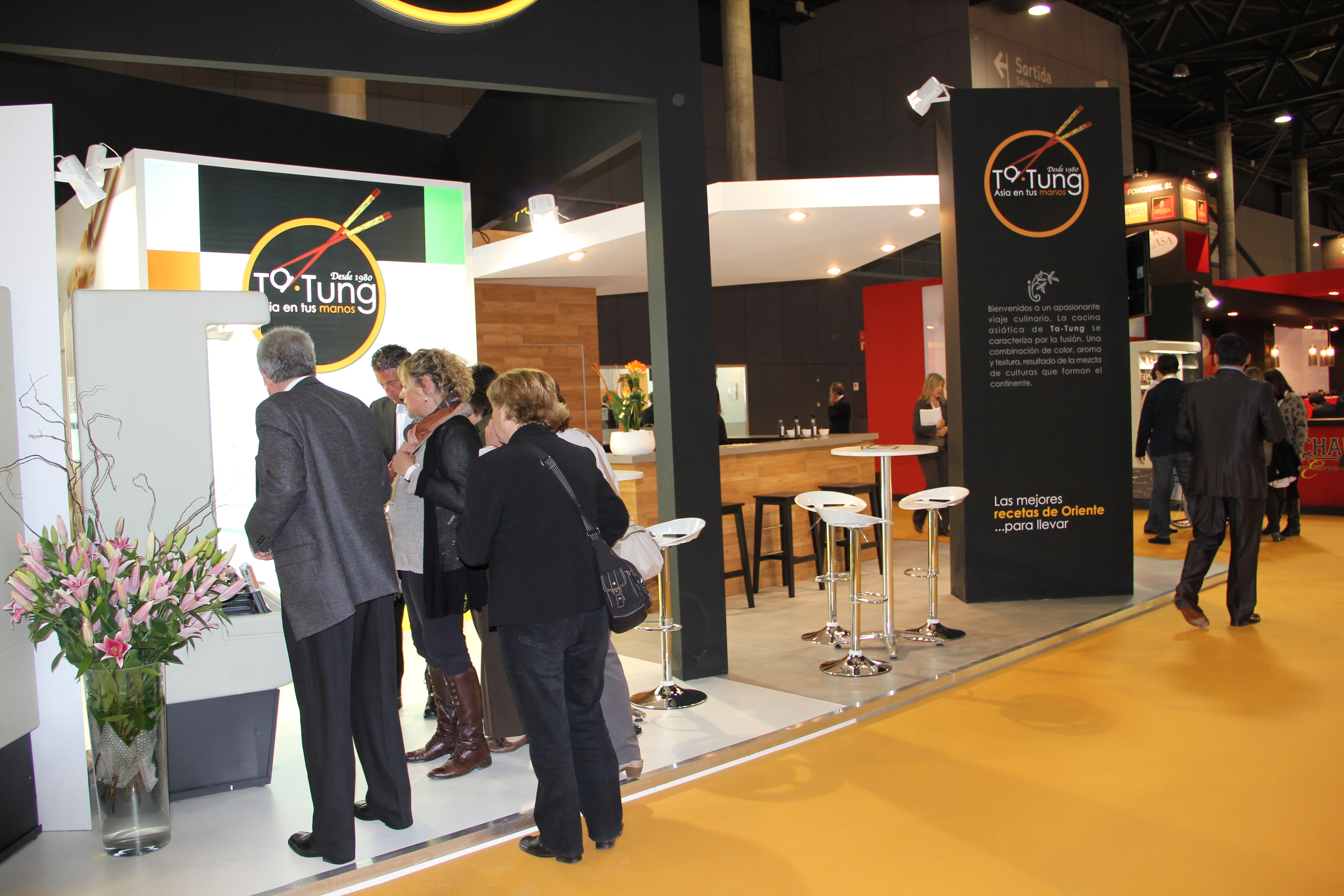
- Ta-Tung at Alimentaria
- Industry: Food
- Founded: 1980 by Kav Ly
- Headquarters: Sant Vicenç dels Horts, Catalonia, Spain
- Key people: Kav Ly (Chairman); Lorenzo Arias; Fuei Pang

Ta-Tung is a food company based in L'Hospitalet de Llobregat, Catalonia, Spain. The company was founded in 1980 by Ly Kav, a Cambodian who arrived in Barcelona in 1979. The company makes precooked Asian cuisine, and is the leading producer of such food in Spain. In addition to Spain, Ta-Tung also exports its products to Italy and Portugal; with plans for expansion to France in 2015.
