= Liz Lovely =

Waitsfield, Vermont

- Founded: 2003
- Fate: Bankrupted

Liz Lovely was a Waitsfield, Vermont, based artisan, certified gluten-free, vegan cookie company that baked thousands of cookies every day. Liz Lovely cookies were distributed semi-nationally through United Natural Foods, the largest U.S. natural foods distributor.

In November 2005, Liz Lovely cookies were rated Product of the Year by VegNews.

On September 28, 2012, company owners Liz and Dan Holtz appeared on ABC's Friday-evening "Shark Tank" asking for $200,000 for 10% interest in their million-dollar company (which they valued at two million dollars) but were declined by all five sharks.

In 2014, Liz and Dan Holtz were divorced and Dan no longer works for or is involved in the Liz Lovely business.

On April 19, 2018, Liz Scott (formerly Liz Holtz) filed for Chapter 7 Bankruptcy in Indiana, detailing a total of $636,024 in unpaid debts.

As of 2018, the company website does not exist.
