= Breadsmith =

Wisconsin-based bakery franchise organization

- Type: Private
- Industry: Bakery Production and Sales Franchising
- Founded: 1993; 33 years ago
- Headquarters: Whitefish Bay, Wisconsin, U.S.
- Area served: United States
- Key people: Dan Sterling (Founder) Tim Malouf (President)
- Products: Bread

Breadsmith is a Milwaukee, Wisconsin-based bakery franchise organization that specializes in artisan breads, and has over 35 stores in the United States, mostly located in the Upper Midwest.

== History ==
Founder Dan Sterling opened his first bakery in Milwaukee in 1993. While studying abroad in Norway, he had his first taste of European breads. When he returned to the United States, he graduated from Harvard Business School and volunteered to help a local bakery with its accounting. He never lost his love of European homemade breads, and from there came the idea to launch a bakery of his own, called Breadsmith.

In 1993, Sterling opened his first bakery in Milwaukee at 2632 N. Downer Ave, where a Breadsmith owned by franchisee Don Kaminski is still open today. One year later, Sterling sold his first franchised store and the company has continued to grow as a franchise] operation. Currently, there are 35 Breadsmith stores around the United States. Sterling ran Breadsmith, Inc until 2001, when he decided to begin several new business ventures.

Breadsmith's president since February 2006 is Tim Malouf. He began at Breadsmith shortly after the first store opened in 1993 and has worked in several positions, including head of research and development and vice president, before being promoted to president. The Breadsmith Franchising, Inc office is located at 409 E Silver Spring Drive in Whitefish Bay, Wisconsin.

== Breads ==
Breadsmith sells a variety of products but is focused on breads including French boule, French baguette, French peasant, sourdough, rustic Italian and whole wheat) which make up the company's daily bread offerings. Breadsmith offers artisan breads without additives or preservatives, and makes specialty breads, cookies, muffins and sweets. Breadsmith also offers specialty breads including brioche, ciabatta, cornbread, focaccia, multigrain, pizza dough, raisin cinnamon, Russian rye, Stollen, traditional rye and a variety of dessert breads, cookies, scones and coffee cakes.

== Operations ==
Breadsmith is focused on "made-from-scratch, hand-crafted" breads using ingredients including unbleached, unbromated wheat flour. Each store has a 6-ton stone hearth oven that can bake up to 160 loaves at one time, and the oven's steam injection system gives the breads their distinctive European-style crust. Breadsmith stores can be found in 38 locations in 19 states (Kentucky, Arizona, Illinois, Indiana, Maryland, Michigan, Minnesota, Mississippi, Missouri, New York, New Jersey, North Dakota, South Dakota, Ohio, South Carolina, Texas, Florida and Wisconsin). Most stores provide loaves to retail shoppers, as well as restaurants and grocers through wholesale partnerships.
