= Fiendish Feet =

Brand of yoghurt

Fiendish Feet yoghurt pot

Fiendish Feet was a brand of low fat dairy yogurts aimed at children, produced by St Ivel in the late 1980s and early 1990s. The yoghurt pots had printed faces on the front and were moulded with feet on the bottom.

== Flavours ==
The main yoghurts were sold in multipacks of four flavours: Spooky Wooky (banana flavour), Fangs a Lot (strawberry flavour), Frank 'n' Stein (raspberry flavour), and Rattle 'n' Roll (chocolate flavour). More varieties were introduced later on such as Pharaoh Nuff (toffee flavour).
