= Wrights Pies =

Manufacturer of baked goods and confectionery based in Stoke-on-Trent, England

Wrights Pies (Shelton) Ltd.
- Type: Private limited
- Industry: Food (Food on the go)
- Founded: 1926; 100 years ago in Stoke-on-Trent, Staffordshire, England
- Founder: John James Wright
- Headquarters: Crewe, England
- Key people: Mr Peter Wright
- Products: Savouries, Confectionery, Prepared meals, Vending
- Revenue: £65m
- Owner: The Wright family
- Number of employees: 640
- Parent: Compleat Food Group
- Subsidiaries: Wrights Food Group & Urban Bistro & Wrights Bites
- Website: wrightsfoodgroup.com

Wright's Pies (Shelton) Ltd. is a manufacturer of baked goods and confectionery based in Stoke-on-Trent, Staffordshire, England. Wrights Food Group was bought by The Compleat Food Group in December 2021.

== History ==
The company was founded in 1926 by John James Wright making pies from the front room of his terraced house in Stoke-on-Trent. The company now operates three manufacturing sites situated in Crewe, Cheshire and remained family owned until December 2021 when it was sold for an undisclosed amount to The Compleat Food Group.

== Retail ==
Wright's have 15 retail outlets. Longton, Stoke Town Centre, College Road Shelton, Northwood, Stoke, Burslem, Tunstall, Rugeley, Newcastle-under-Lyme, Hanley, Fenton, Meir, Leek, Kidsgrove, Chell & Wolstanton.

== Wholesale ==
Wright's operates a fresh wholesale delivery service operating from Crewe. Deliveries can be made to Manchester, North Wales, Derby and Birmingham. Freshly baked pies and savouries, confectionery and sandwiches are available Monday to Friday

== Frozen ==
Wright's also have a frozen food delivery operation with the option of ready baked frozen products or frozen un-baked products which can be baked as needed. Wright's exports to over 26 countries.

The company is capable of producing over 5 million individual items every week.
