= Bradfords Bakers =

Chain of bakeries operating throughout the Greater Glasgow area of Scotland

Bradfords Bakers & Gifts Ltd
- Type: Baker and confectioner
- Industry: Food (Bakery Group)
- Founded: 1924
- Headquarters: Glasgow, Scotland, UK
- Products: Baked goods, savouries, hot and cold takeaway, hampers
- Website: www.bradfordsbakers.com

Bradfords is an online business selling cakes and hampers.

The business was originally a chain of bakeries operating throughout the Greater Glasgow area of Scotland, with the main bakery and head office in Thornliebank. The company had 15 retail outlets and also owned Miss Cranston's tearooms. They produce traditional hand-crafted products as well as more specialised items such as chocolates, Danish pastries, biscuits, jams and chutneys. The retail business went into liquidation in 2003. It re-emerged as an on-line business trading under the name "Bradfords Bakers & Gifts Ltd" under the same family ownership following the liquidation of the original business.
