= Dan's Chocolates =

Chocolate maker in Vermont, United States

Dan's Chocolates is a Burlington, Vermont chocolate maker.

== History ==
The company was founded in 1999 by Dan Cunningham. It was established as a subsidiary of the BlueMountain.com greeting card site and spun off as an independent venture in 2000.

The company operates both a factory direct boxed chocolates business as well as a business selling all-natural chocolate bars and truffles through retail grocery stores.

Dan's Chocolates comprises milk, dark, and white varieties.

Dan's Chocolates posts a social responsibility scorecard on its site, which includes measures to reduce energy use, greenhouse gas emissions, and waste products in manufacturing. Since its founding day, a percentage of each sale has been given to one of the charities which customers designate at checkout.

Dan's Chocolates became part of Hauser Foods in 2017.
