= Kuli Kuli, Inc. =

American food company

- Type: Private
- Industry: Food; Beverage; Consumer Packaged Goods (CPG); Health; Wellness
- Founded: 2011
- Headquarters: Oakland, California, United States
- Key people: Lisa Curtis, Jordan Moncharmont (founders)
- Products: Moringa Food Bars, Pure Moringa Vegetable Powder, Moringa Green Energy Shot
- Owner: Lisa Curtis
- Number of employees: 500
- Website: www.kulikulifoods.com

Kuli Kuli Inc. is a food business based in Oakland, CA, and the first company to introduce Moringa oleifera to the USA market in the form of energy bars, powders, smoothie mixes, and energy shots. Moringa is a nutritious plant food. Kuli Kuli's CEO, Lisa Curtis, started the company after working with moringa in the Peace Corps in Niger. Kuli Kuli works with women-owned and small family farming cooperatives in West Africa, Latin America, and South-East Asia.

== Mission ==
Kuli Kuli's mission is to source moringa from family farmers and women's cooperatives and provide moringa products nationwide.

== History ==
Kuli Kuli was founded by Lisa Curtis. As a Peace Corps Volunteer in Niger, she was introduced to moringa and upon returning to the United States, she began to explore how to introduce moringa to USA markets. Whole Foods Market was the first retailer to pick up Kuli Kuli’s Moringa Superfood Bars, starting in Northern California. Kuli Kuli expanded to over 11,000 retail locations, including 2,500 Walmart locations.

Kuli Kuli sources its Moringa oleifera from family farmers and women's farming cooperatives in West Africa, Latin America, and South-East Asia.

== Funding ==
On May 6, 2013, Kuli Kuli launched an Indiegogo campaign that raised $52,997 for fund for the first manufacturing run. In 2015, Kuli Kuli received a Clinton Foundation grant, and raised another $100,000 on Indiegogo. In 2017, Kuli Kuli closed a $4.25m Series A with Kellogg’s new venture capital fund, and in 2019, a $6.34m Series B with Griffith Foods. More recently, Kuli Kuli has raised $1.3m in debt financing from Whole Foods Market and impact investors to support the launch of their gummy supplements line.

== Products ==
Moringa powders are made from the dried and milled leaves of the tree Moringa oleifera.
