= Higgidy =

Food manufacturer

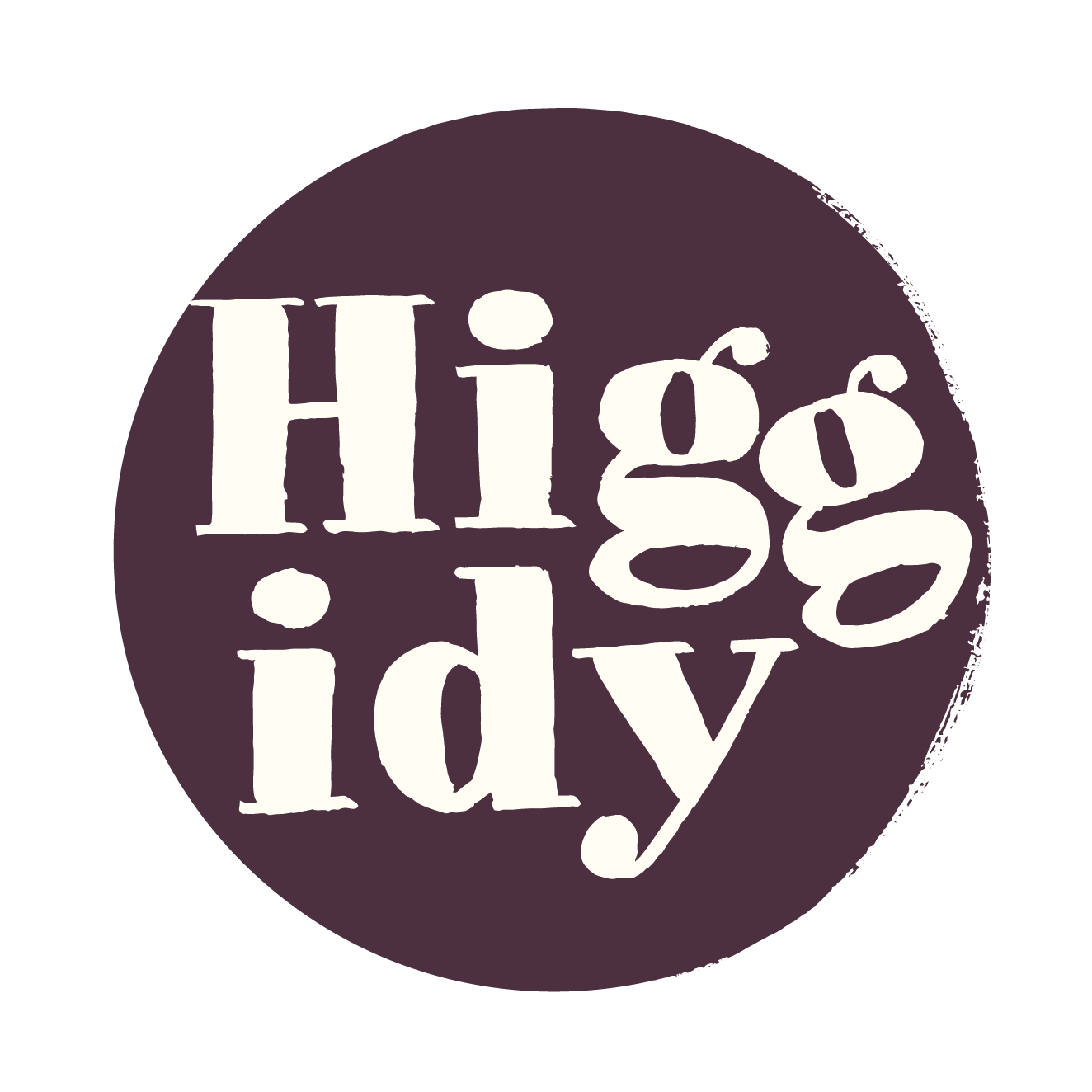

Higgidy is a fresh food manufacturer based in Shoreham-by-Sea, West Sussex, England. The company produces a range of pies, quiches, tortillas and rolls. It was co-founded by Camilla Stephens and James Foottit in 2003. The name of the company originates from an early description of the uneven appearance of their pies by a visiting child.

== History ==
Camilla Stephens started baking her own pies in her kitchen at home. After supplying local events and independent retailers, the company approached the café chain, EAT, which then became Higgidy's first major customer in 2004.

As a small supplier, Higgidy gained momentum when it was selected to supply Sainsbury's supermarkets as part of the "Supply Something New" scheme in 2007. Success grew from there and Higgidy went on to achieve a turnover of £3.2 million with a workforce of 50 employees. It was in the Sunday Times Fast Track 100 fastest growing companies in the UK for two years running in 2009 and 2010 and then, in 2011, Higgidy was chosen as the regional winner for the South of England in the HSBC Business Thinking initiative.

The first Higgidy manufacturing site was in Southwick, West Sussex. In 2007, the business moved to premises at Dolphin Road in Shoreham-by-Sea which, in 2020, employed about 300 staff.

Founder Camilla Stephens published two cookbooks. Higgidy: The Cookbook (2007) contained 100 recipes for pies and more. Higgidy: The Veggie Cookbook (2019) featured 120 vegetarian recipes.

A long-standing supporter of FareShare and FareShare Sussex, Higgidy donates surplus stock on a weekly basis, supporting those suffering from hunger in the UK via community kitchens and local food banks.

In 2019, Samworth Brothers, which owns a portfolio of other pie-makers such as Ginsters, purchased a minority stake in Higgidy with an option to increase their shareholding. There were no plans for a merger of production but the partnership was expected to provide operational opportunities.

== Products ==
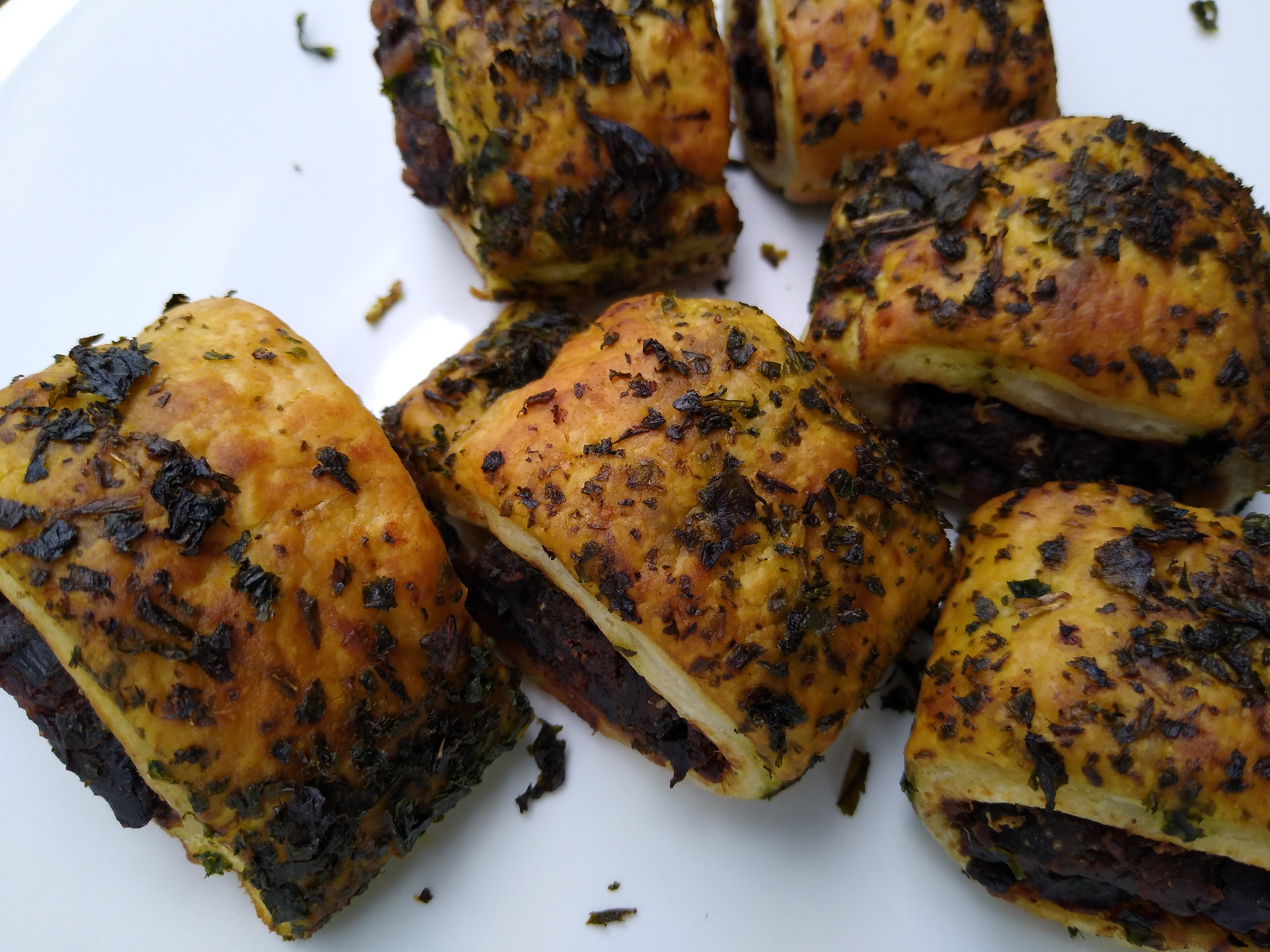
Higgidy miso mushroom vegan rolls

The Higgidy Family Kitchen produced just under 13 million individual products in 2019.

The range now offers pies (individual and little pies), quiches (large, little and snack quiches), tortillas, rolls (sausage, veggie and vegan) and a snacking and sharing range (including dinky rolls, pastry swirls and savoury muffins).

Higgidy products can be purchased in Sainsbury's, Waitrose, Ocado, Tesco, Co-op, Asda, Booths, Amazon Fresh, Boots and some Londis and Budgens stores. Its products are also stocked in some wholesalers, such as Cotswold Fayre.
