= Meica =

German food company

- Type: Public
- Industry: food
- Founded: 1908
- Headquarters: Edewecht (Ammerland), Lower Saxony, Germany
- Products: food
- Website: http://www.meica.de

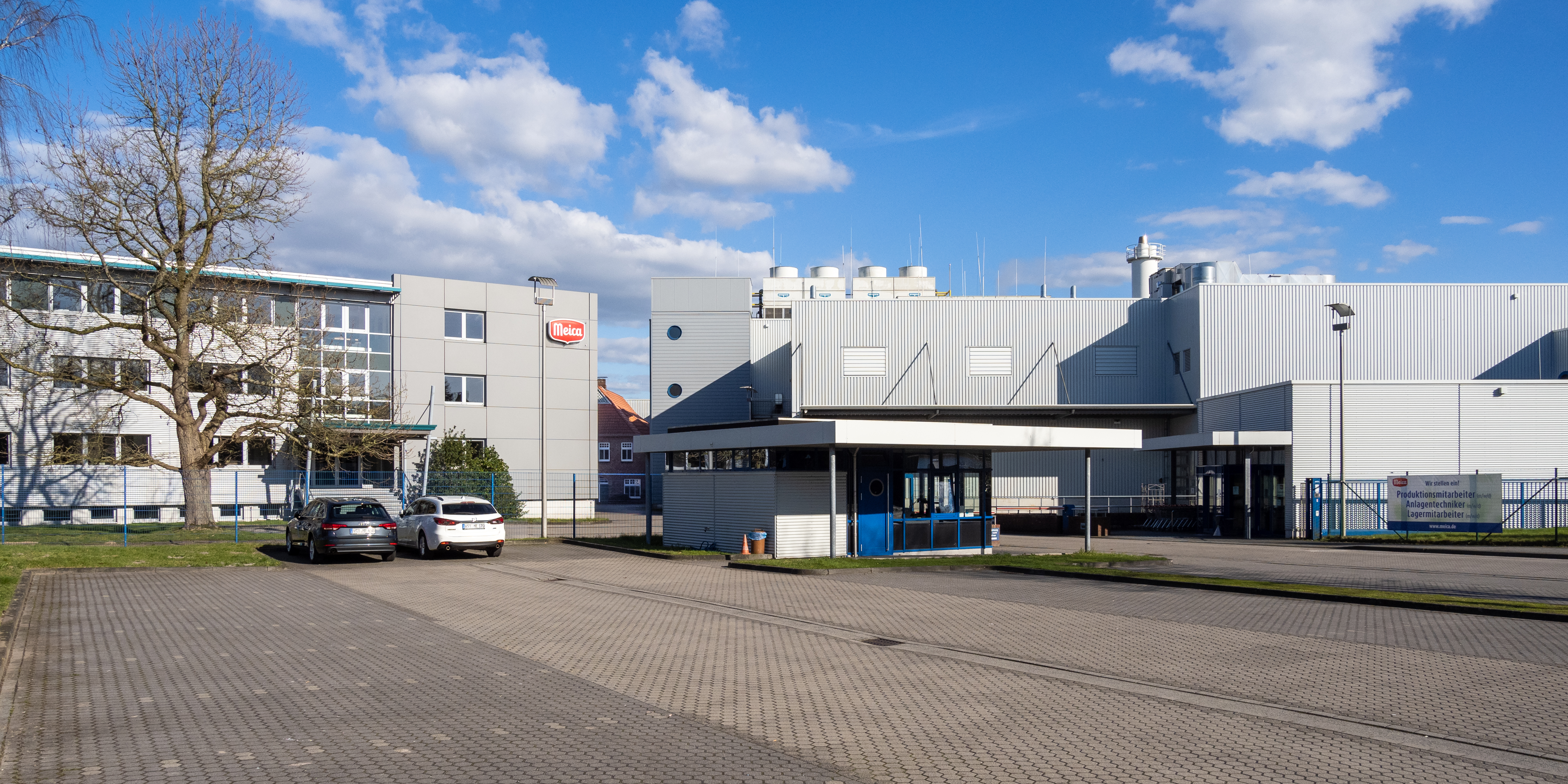
The entrance to a Meica facility

Meica is a German food company based in Edewecht. It was founded in 1908.

Meica produces a range of sausages. The company exports products to about 50 countries and offers private-label production services.

As of 2020, the company does not use the Haltungsform welfare label to indicate how the animals used in its products are treated.
