= Hai Ha Confectionery =

Vietnamese confectionery company

Hai Ha Confectionery JSC (CTCP Bánh kẹo Hải Hà) (HNX:HHC, HaiHaCo) is one of the top confectionery companies of Vietnam. The company was founded in 1960, and is often shortened to HaiHaCo.

== Information ==
Hai Ha Confectionery is known for manufacturing and distributing cake, biscuits, candy, snacks and jams, the company's operations are primarily in north Vietnam and the Hanoi area; it also operates branches in Da Nang and Ho Chi Minh City. The company is based in Hai Ba Trung, Hanoi and is listed on the Hanoi Securities Trading Center. The cities in which the factories are located is Hanoi capital, Viettri city, Thaibinh city. A of now in the factories, there are about ten production lines. Hai Ha Confectionery currently exports their products to the countries Japan, Taiwan, Russia, the Middle East and Asian countries. They are currently trying to expand their exporting into the areas of Asia, Far Eastern countries and European countries. In 2003, the company decided to go private and it now operates officially under Joint Stock Company.

== Products ==
The main products that Hai Ha Confectionery is known for includes the following:

- Chewy candies
- Jellies
- Lollipops
- Cakes
- Cream wafers
- Cookies
- Confectioneries
- Biscuits
- Crackers

== See also ==
- Bakery
- List of food companies
