= Joy Baking Group =

Ice cream cone manufacturer

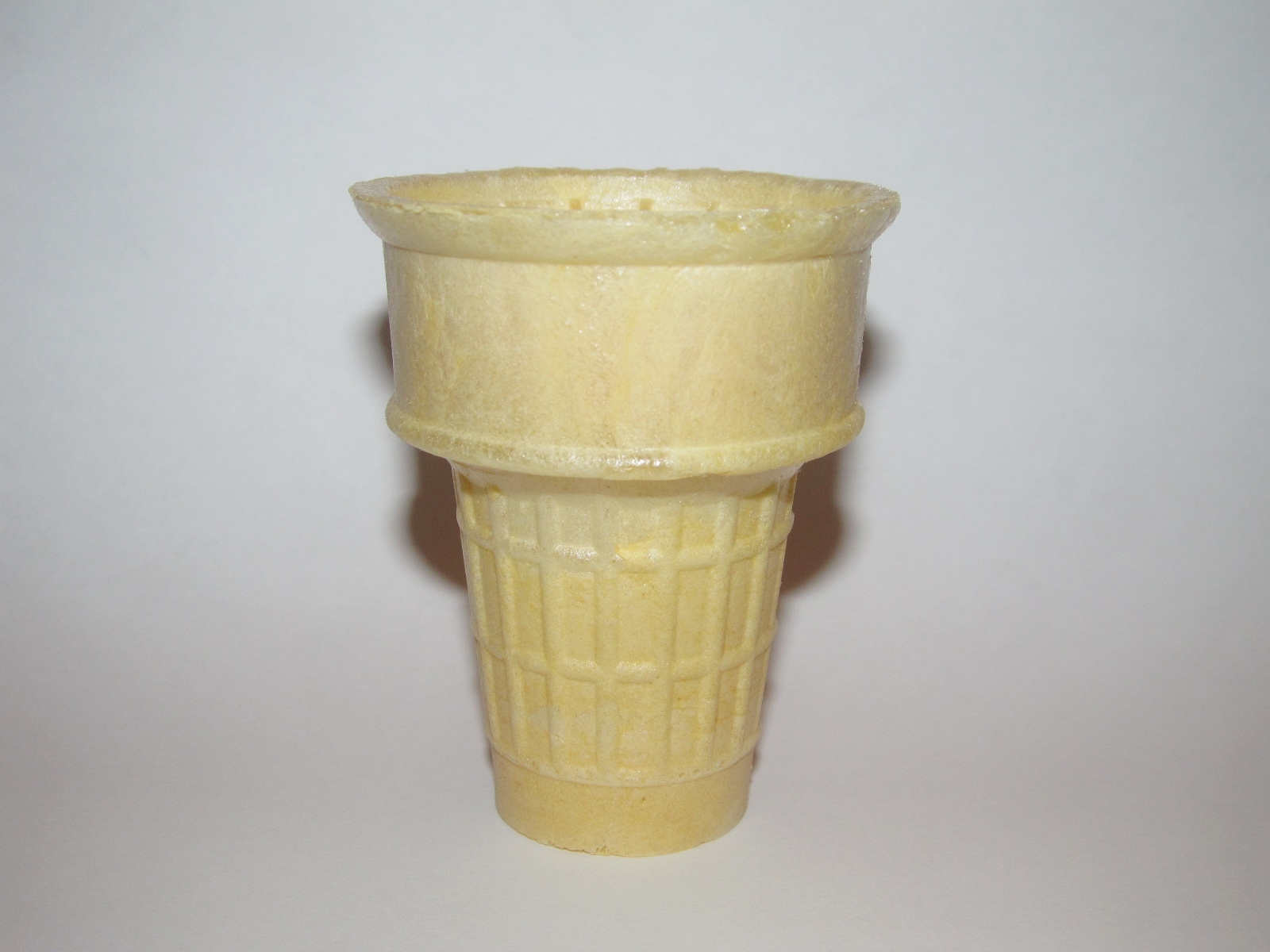
Joy Baking produces cake cones, sugar cones, waffle cones, and specialty ice cream cones.

Joy Baking Group is a U.S. company that produces more than 40% of the ice cream cones sold in U.S. stores and more than 60% of the ice cream cones sold in U.S. ice cream shops, including the cones used by Mister Softee, Dairy Queen, and McDonald's. It is the largest ice cream cone maker in the world. They bake about 1.5 billion ice cream cones each year. Due to consolidation in the industry since the 1990s, Joy's only large competitor is Keebler Company, which holds about 15% of the market share in retail stores, plus a few small and specialty makers, such as The Konery.

Joy Baking was founded in 1918 by two immigrants from Lebanon. The original company name was George and Thomas Cone Company. Founder Albert George's grandson, David George, is the current CEO. Joy Baking employs about 1,000 people. The company is owned by the George family and its employees.
