= Lesters Foods =

Canadian food company

Lester's Foods Ltd. is a Canadian meat processor based in Laval, QC. Founded in 1931 by Eastern European immigrant Max Lester who sold meat products out of his deli in Montreal, Quebec. The business continued under his sons Moe and Joe who opened a plant in 1964 to keep up with demand.

The company's main products are smoked meat and hot dogs, of which it produces some 140 million each year.

The Lester's supermarket deli products company is not to be confused with the separately-owned Lester's Deli restaurant in Outremont, QC.
