= Pero Family Farms Food Company =

Pero Family Farms
- Type: Private
- Founded: 1908
- Headquarters: Delray Beach, Florida, USA
- Products: Mini Sweet Peppers, Green Bean, other Vegetables
- Website: perofamilyfarms.com

Pero Family Farms Food Company, formerly Pero Vegetable Company is a Sales, Marketing and Distribution group and a part of an American-based agricultural corporation headquartered in Delray Beach, Florida. Pero is a large U.S. vegetable grower, packager, marketer and shipper. Pero produces bell peppers (green, red, yellow and orange), specialty peppers (such as chili jalapeño, and Mini Sweet Pepper), cucumbers, squash, zucchini, green beans, eggplant, and pickles.

Today the company has farms located in Delray Beach, Florida; Omega, Georgia; Benton Harbor, Michigan; and Tennessee. Operations include the sales and delivery of bulk commodities, whole freshwrap vegetables and fresh cut packaged retail products.

== History ==
Pero started as a modest farm started by Sicilian immigrant, Peter Pero in Brant, New York in 1908. His descendants continued the farming operations, which had expanded into Pennsylvania in the 1950s. The headquarters was moved to Delray Beach, Florida in 1981.
