= Schweizer Getraenke AG, Obermeilen =

Swiss food company

Logo

Swiss Drinks Limited (Schweizer Getränke AG in German, Boissons Suisses SA in French, Bevande Svizzere SA in Italian) was a Swiss company, known as Obermeilen, specializing in the production of fruit based products, flavorings and distillates for manufacturers of the food industry. "The flavours and extracts are suitable for various applications: beverages, confectionery, bakery, chocolate, dairy products. " In 2014 the company was taken over by Bischofszell Nahrungsmittel AG (Bina) and in 2015 Bina announced that they will shut down the production facility in Obermeilen and move the entire production to Bischofszell.

== History ==
Schweizer Getraenke AG Obermeilen was founded 1918 in Männedorf, Switzerland. In 1931, the firm moved its center of production to Obermeilen, Switzerland.

In 1918, SGO's main function was the manufacture of a carbonated lemonade called Si-Si. Beverage bottling, fruit processing, and the production of fruit "essences, fruit juices and syrups" comprised the remainder of the firm's services at that time. Upon its relocation to Obermeilen in 1931, SGO ceased bottling lemonade and began to import lemons from Sicily for the use of their zests in the manufacturing of distillates. By 1940, the firm began to focus more heavily on the "manufacture of beverage intermediate products, distillates, flavours, syrups as well as fruit bases" In 1950, SGO developed and manufactured new fruit bases for yoghurts." SGO was the first company to develop a fruit base specifically to flavor yogurt. This work was transferred in 1956 to their subsidiary company DSF, based in Constance, Germany, a company that was founded by SGO for this purpose; six years later, the same information was sold to SIAS, based in Paris, France. Starting in 1962, new facilities were created to suit SGO's growing production, including a new building for fruit processing (1962), a new refrigeration plant (1972), hostel-style accommodations for employees (1972), the extension of distillation and fruit confits (1976), and a new building with cooling and refrigeration plants, shipping department and offices (1990).

In 1970, SGO began producing candied fruit and fruit toppings, the only product SGO makes that produced for and sold directly to consumers. SGO registered their trademark for fruit products in the food industry in 1981. In 1993, SGO celebrated its 75th anniversary. In 2003, SGO began operating a new filling center. By 2004, roughly 60% of SGO sales and production was in the form of raw fruit materials for the dairy industry, more specifically, for fruit bases in yogurt and yogurt drinks. SGO also offered a variety of fruit preparations, candied fruits, jams, fruit fillings, ice cream bases, syrups, toppings, and premium fruit distillates for all areas of the food industry. In 2009, SGO stopped the production of both syrups in glass bottles and of candied fruits.

=== Acquisitions, partnerships, and development ===
- In 1956, SGO transferred their manufacture of fruit preparations to their German subsidiary company DSF, Deutsch-Schweizerische Früchteverarbeitung GmbH; in 1962, SGO passed the manufacturing to the French firm SIAS, Société Industrielle et Agricole de la Somme. SIAS was taken over by the food production company Agrana in 2004; In 2005, Agrana also took over DSF.
- In 1990, SGO took over the Dregelyvar fruit processing plan in Drégelypalánk, Hungary. Dregelyvar has subsequently grown into the biggest fruit additive supplier to Hungarian dairies. In 2000, however, the SGO sold Dregelyvar to the German company Zentis, a manufacturer of fruit products and marzipan in Germany.
- In June 2004, Urs E. Dietschi was interviewed in the magazine Schweizerische Lebensmittel Industrie, about SGO, its products, and its particularly innovative character as part of the food industry. The article is entitled "Obermeilen – aus der Welt der Früchte und Aromen," or, "Obermeilen - From the world of fruits and flavors."
- In 2006, SGO acquired Promena AG as a new distribution and marketing partner for Obermeilen topping, Obermeilen syrup and Cusenier syrup within Switzerland."
- In March 2010, SGO was in the news due to a freak accident when a factory worker set off a brief, isolated, but violent explosion, when a highly flammable liquid, isopentane, escaped while he was filling a solvent distillation unit. When combined with oxygen, the isopentane created a four-meter-high (13 ft) flame, that was quickly extinguished. One worker suffered significant burn injuries, and two others suffered smoke inhalation. Due to uncertainty over whether or not there would be further explosions, 80 members of the local fire services were called to the scene.
- In 2014 the company was taken over by Bischofszell Nahrungsmittel AG.
- In 2015 it was announced that the facility will be closed and that the production will be moved to Bischofszell. The moving process was finalized in 2016.

=== Certifications ===
- In 1994, SGO received ISO 9001 certification "for fruit preparations and flavours."
- In 2003, SGO received certification for ISO 9001:200.
- SGO received certification from the British Retail Consortium (BRC) by the Swiss Association for Quality Management and Systems (SQS) for flavours, fruit preparations and concentrated juices" in 2005.
- SGO also produces certified organic products which follow the guidelines of both Bio Suisse and EU organic.
- SGO is certified to make Kosher products, and is recognized by the kosher division of the Orthodox Union.
- SGO is also certified to provide raw material for halal products.

== Management ==
SGO is a family-run firm. Emil Dietschi took over leadership upon SGO's move to Obermeilen from Maennedorf in 1931, and remained at the head of the company until 1972. Upon the death of Emil Dietschi, his son, Urs E. Dietschi, took over, and acted as CEO for 25 years, from 1972 to 2007, until his retirement. In 2007, Bruno Witschi took on the position of CEO, however Urs E. Dietschi still acts as President and Chairman of the company.

== Environmental record ==
SGO 's production processes are assessed, and improved, in the interest of both reducing cost and reducing effects on the environment. Waste disposal is also analyzed in this manner. The company has made a goal of improving energy efficiency by at least 1.5% annually both for environmental concerns and to reduce costs. SGO is a member of the Lake Zurich Energy Model Group and the International Energy Agency, and has also been a member of the Energie-Agentur der Wirtschaft, the Energy Agency for the Economy, since 1997. Another goal of SGO is to reduce carbon dioxide emissions through changes to both processes and infrastructure. The company disposes of biological wastes from organic production through a professional disposal company. When possible, the biological gases, produced through fermentation, are upgraded to natural gas quality, to feed it into the network and to offer it as fuel for vehicles at petrol stations.
