= Zoo Holdings Group =

Food and Beverage Company

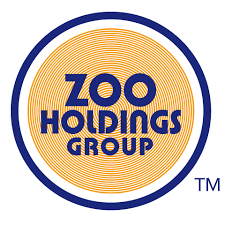
Logo

Zoo Holdings Group is a food and beverage management company headquartered in Shanghai, China, and has its offices in mainland China, Taiwan and South Korea. Its founder, Kim Kun woo has also created product lines such as Zoo Coffee, Tiger Topoki, and Monkey's Kitchen.

== History ==
=== Founding and expansion ===
Starting the career with Seven Monkeys Coffee in 2006, Kim Kun Woo founded Zoo Coffee in South Korea in 2009, a coffeehouse chain brand featuring decorations full of animal elements.

Since its establishment, Zoo Coffee has expanded to over 100 stores in South Korea within 2 years. Its fortunes did not reverse until 2011 when some failed investments were made, and thus Kim sold a part of the ownership of Zoo Coffee brand in the world to Tae Yang Ceramic Corporation.

=== Chinese market ===
In 2012, Kim restarted his career in China and opened the first Zoo Coffee outside South Korea in Beijing, the capital city of China, and after that Zoo Coffee expanded to about 150 stores across China during the following two years.

At the same time of Zoo Coffee expansion, Kim founded F&B brands Tiger Topoki (Korean hotpot), Tiger Bulgogi (Korean barbecue) and Monkeys Kitchen (Italian food), and set up Zoo Toy Trade Company, limited to support the logistics for the stores across China. Zoo group announced to source only cage free eggs for all its stores in China, by 2025.

== Family brands ==
=== Zoo Coffee ===
Zoo Coffee, established in South Korea in 2009, is a unique animal-themed coffeehouse chain brand. The most outstanding feature of Zoo Coffee lies in its decoration, full of animal elements—giraffe and zebra models, images of elephants and tigers on the walls. There are animals everywhere in the stores. The inspiration comes from the idea that people often feel relaxed and free in nature, and thus the stores are designed after nature and zoo with the aim to help people relax themselves in the comfortable space. Since its founding, Zoo Coffee has opened over 100 stores in South Korea and over 150 stores in China. Its headquarter has shifted from South Korea to China since 2012, with offices in Beijing, Guangzhou, Shanghai and Taiwan. From 2014, Zoo Coffee has appointed Korean popular actor Yoon Sang Hyun and actress Nam Gyuri as its brand stars.

=== Tiger Topoki ===
Tiger Topoki, founded in 2011, provides popular and authentic cuisine from South Korea. Topoki refers to a special hotpot cuisine from South Korea. Since 2014, Tiger Topoki has appointed Lee Kwang-Soo, the popular actor as its brand star, which has helped improve the brand awareness in a large part. By the end of 2014, Tiger Topoki has opened over 10 stores in China.

=== Tiger Bulgogi ===
Established in 2011, Tiger Bulgogi is a Korean chain restaurant providing Korean barbecue and traditional cuisine of South Korea. By the end of 2014, it has opened two stores in China.

=== Monkeys Kitchen ===
Monkeys Kitchen, founded in 2011, is an Italian restaurant with a bright and fresh style of decoration. In 2015, it invited Ahn Jae Hyeom, a Korean model and actor famous for playing a role in the TV series "Man from the Star". Monkeys Kitchen has opened 4 stores in China by the end of February 2015.
