= Scotty Brand =

Scottish company which markets and sells food products

Scotty Brand Ltd
- Headquarters: Airdrie, Scotland, UK
- Parent: Albert Bartlett Ltd.
- Website: www.scottybrand.com

Scotty Brand Ltd is a company which markets and sells food products based in Airdrie, Scotland. Operating Scotty Brand as an umbrella brand, it works with a number of Scottish producers to coordinate activities and pool resources.

== Products ==
Products include potatoes, soft fruit (strawberries and raspberries). and soup mixes. In March 2013, the company announced the launch of a coleslaw and potato salad.

== History ==
Scotty Brand Ltd was established in 2011 as a subsidiary of Albert Bartlett Ltd, though the Scotty Brand marque was first used in 1948 by the parent company's founder, Albert Bartlett, who sold beetroot under the name. Albert Bartlett's began his business with a £30 cast iron beetroot boiler, in his garden shed. The brand remains very closely linked to the original in its look and values packaging. Current packaging can be found on the Company's website

In September 2011, Scotty Brand appointed Billington Cartmel as its marketing agency to produce advertising, digital and social media content. When Billington Cartmel closed its Scottish office in October 2013, Scotty Brand became an inaugural client of Guy & Co, which was started by Billington's former Business Director David Guy. The first billboard campaign went live in November 2011

In April 2012, Scotty Brand announced a sponsorship deal with Disney Pixar to promote the movie Brave. The associated TV ad aired in July 2012. This campaign won a Marketing Society Star Award.

In 2013, Scotty the farm dog was introduced as part of an extensive TV campaign, which has also developed into radio ads as Scotty the roving reporter visits various of the brand's partners growing and producing food across Scotland.

In December 2019, Scotty Brand reached Number 12 in The Scottish Grocer magazine's Scottish Grocery Brands Review as compiled by Kantar Worldpanel.
