= Rhee Bros =

Asian food wholesaler and distributor

Rhee Bros, Inc.
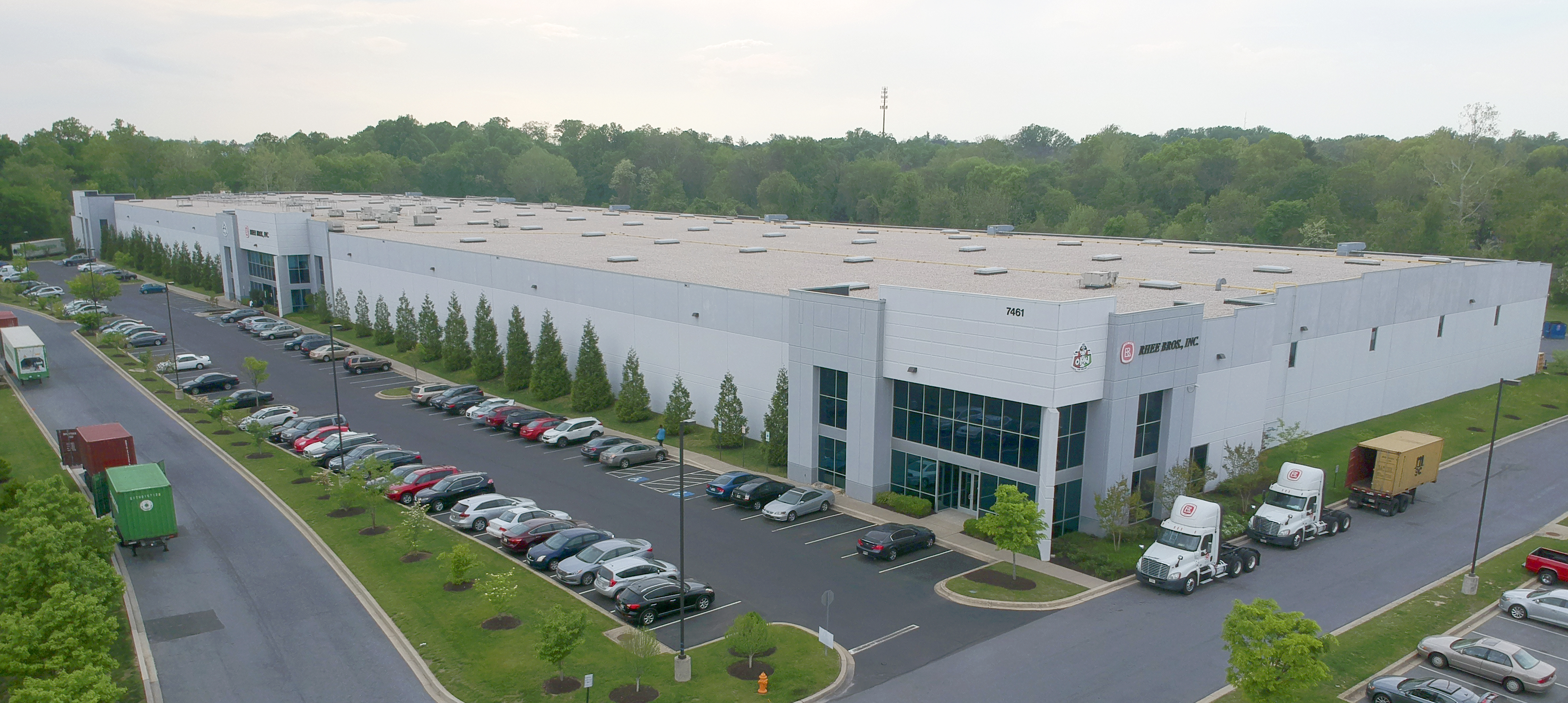
- Rhee Brothers headquarters
- Industry: Asian food wholesale and distribution
- Founded: 1976; 49 years ago in Silver Spring, Maryland
- Founder: Syng Man Rhee and his three brothers
- Headquarters: Hanover, Maryland, United States

Rhee Bros, Inc. (Korean: 리브라더스) is an Asian foods wholesaler and distributor. It sells Asian food products from a variety of origins, including Korean, Chinese, Japanese, Vietnamese, Thai, and Filipino; and offers dry, refrigerated, frozen, and household goods. Along with its distribution partners, Rhee Bros sells retail and foodservice accounts in the US and internationally. The company has its headquarters in Columbia, Maryland. Company revenue was approximately $300 million USD in 2004.

Rhee Bros was founded in 1976 by Syng Man Rhee, along with his three brothers, who started in a small warehouse in Silver Spring, Maryland. In 1989, the company began a retail affiliate relationship to sell Rhee Bros' products at Lotte Plaza, an Asian supermarket chain in the Baltimore–Washington metropolitan area. A retail relationship with Assi Plaza, which has stores across the country, followed. In 2004, the company reported having over 40 Assi-branded stores in Maryland, New York, California, and Georgia. As of September 2023, Assi Plaza has closed all but two locations.

In 2001, the company issued a recall of about 2,400 boxes of "Lotte Margaret" cookies imported from Korea because they contained unlabelled peanuts and eggs.

In 2020, Rhee Bros was sued by the state of California for violating Prop 65 with their seafoods which contained high levels of the toxic heavy metals lead and cadmium. The suite also claims that Rhee Bros violated California's unfair competition laws and its prohibition on fraudulent practices.
