= Duc d'O =

Belgian food company

- Company type: Public
- Industry: food
- Founded: 1983
- Headquarters: Kruibeke, Belgium
- Products: food
- Website: https://www.ducdo.com

Duc d'O is a Belgian food company based in Bruges. It was founded in 1983 by Hendrik Verhelst, a former timber merchant. The company focused on chocolate truffles.

Duc d'O produces a range of chocolates. The company exports products to about 30 countries and offers private-label production services.
