= Dan-D Foods =

Canadian food company

Dan-D Foods Ltd
- Headquarters: Richmond, British Columbia
- Website: www.dandpak.com

Dan-D Foods Ltd is a Canadian food company that acts as an importer, manufacturer and distributor of cashews, dried fruits, rice crackers, snack foods, spices, and other packaged foods from around the world. The company's products are distributed under its own trademarks of Dan-D-Bulk, Dan-D-Pak and Dan-D-Organic with the slogan "Fine Foods of the Earth". Today, Dan-D Foods Group Global operates its business in six countries, and distributes its products, with recent expansions, as far as Australia.

== Notes ==
- Rodriguez, Robert (November 4, 2011). "Dan-D-Pak food company opens a plant in Fresno". The Fresno Bee.
- Flavelle, Dana (November 9, 2004). "Pass the wasabi-coated, kosher cashews, please; Food show goes cross-cultural Trends promote convenience". Toronto Star.
- "Pucks a quasi-Canadian treat; Simply Canadian". Toronto Star. February 15, 2006.
