= Captain Ken's Foods =

American frozen food processing company

Captain Ken's Foods, Inc. is a privately owned frozen foods processing company based in Saint Paul, Minnesota. It was founded by Ken Freiberg in 1967.

== History ==
Ken Freiberg was originally a fire captain in St. Paul. At his station, it was tradition for firefighters to cook meals to share with the rest of the force; Freiberg's specialty was his baked beans. He opened a stand at the Minnesota State Fair in 1964, and expanded the venture into a dedicated oven-baked bean factory in 1967. He retired from the fire station in 1968 in order to work at his company full-time. By 1980, the company's growth forced a move to a larger facility on Robert Street, where it is still currently located.

In 1989, Freiberg sold Captain Ken's Foods to his employees, who owned the company for ten years until brothers John and Mike Traxler, the current owners, bought it in 1999. Freiberg continued to maintain a close relationship with the company—for example, appearing in parades with Captain Ken's antique fire trucks—until his death in 2005.

== Products ==
While Captain Ken's originally produced only Freiberg's original recipe beans, over the past 40 years it has expanded its product lines to over 20 different items, including chilis, taco meat, and multiple variations on the original beans.

Captain Ken's baked beans were the first frozen baked beans in America.
