= Roti Bunz =

Company of Indonesia

Coordinates: 7.974185°S 112.615238°E

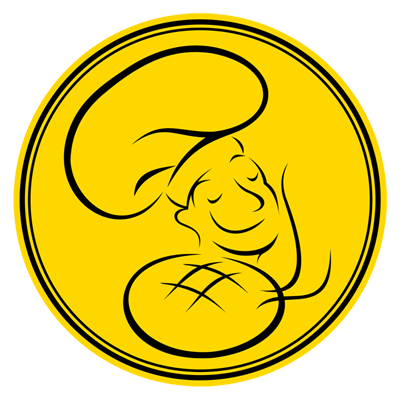
- Company type: Privately held company
- Industry: Bakery, Coffee shop and Bistro
- Founded: 2012; 13 years ago
- Founder: Yudi Haryanto
- Headquarters: Malang, Indonesia
- Area served: Indonesia
- Products: Breads, Coffee, and other foods
- Website: rotibunz.com

Roti Bunz is an Indonesian bakery, bistro, and coffeehouse chain based in Malang, East Java, Indonesia. The company was founded in 2012 by Yudi Haryanto.

== History ==
In 2012, Roti Bunz was established as Roti Bunz Bakery & Cafe. In 2014, its outlets have implemented franchise system until now. At the end of 2015, this outlet was renamed Roti Bunz Bistro.

== Products ==
The menu concept promoted by Roti Bunz is a menu concept that serves bakery, coffees and mainstream bistro foods. The main menu that is relied on is bread bun which has filling and given toppings. The cafe menu is represented by coffee, tea and chocolate. Other foods and beverages menu such as noodles, rice bowls, and milkshakes are also on Roti Bunz.

== Awards ==
List of awards received by Roti Bunz:

- Top Quality Product Excellent Award Winner TOP 50 Leader
- Indonesia Top Business Innovation Award
- Anugerah Wirausaha Indonesia

== See also ==
- List of coffeehouse chains
