= Rosa Food =

American food manufacturer

Rosa Food Products was started in Philadelphia in the year 1900 by Giacomo Foti. He named his store and products Rosa after his wife. At first it was only a small store on the corner of 13th and Federal Streets in Philadelphia. Over time, hundreds of stores bearing the Rosa name were created. A warehouse was needed to supply all the stores with hundreds of products bearing the Rosa name. Giacomo Foti and his son, Leonardo, were packaging cooking oils for their Rosa brand, Rita brand and also for private label customers. As the large supermarkets came into existence, the smaller stores began to close. It was easier to supply the supermarkets with products than their own stores. Rosa Food Products then became a wholesale food distributor.

In the 1990s, the bottling of vinegar and mustard had begun. During the year of 1999, Giacomo II and his family decided on building a new production plant to meet the many needs of its customers. The company bottles its own brands of oil, vinegar, spices, peppers, olives, capers, giardiniera, mustard, bruschetta and pasta sauces. Almost all are available for private label. Rosa Food Products distributes their own 10 quality brands of Rosa, Rita, Leonardo, Luna, Pavilion, Cassino, Angela, He Man and Keller's. The company is now on its way to its 4th generation of family ownership.
