= Odell's =

American popcorn company

Odell's Inc
- Type: Private
- Industry: Movie Theatres, Foodservice & Retail
- Founded: Caldwell, Idaho (1961)
- Headquarters: Reno, Nevada
- Products: Butter, vegetable fats and oils
- Website: www.popntop.com

Odell's is a supplier of popcorn topping and popping products to the concession industry in the Americas. The company's concession product line includes a Real butter topping, a margarine topping and a variety of popping oils. The company's non-concession product line includes a variety of butters that extends beyond concession products to include a product line called Chef's Butter sold to restaurants and retailers.

== History ==
The company was started by Virgil Odell, who owned several theaters in Idaho in the 1960s. At the time, theaters were using creamery butter, or stick butter as we know it today, to put on top of popcorn. The problem with creamery butter is that it needs to be refrigerated and when melted it separates into water, milk solids and butterfat so it had to be constantly stirred before being put on the popcorn. Virgil discovered a process used by the military to remove water and milk solids from butter. This process enabled butter to be shipped overseas without refrigeration or special handling. This process led to the introduction of Odell's Anhydrous Butterfat for use on theater popcorn, it was an immediate success with theatres. On January 31, 1961, Odell Concession Specialty Co., Inc., was formed.

On October 27, 1979, Virgil Odell died and Arthur R. Anderson assumed the duties of the president with 51% ownership in Odell Concession Specialty Co., Inc. The other 49% was split between three other individuals.

At the time, Odell Concession Specialty Co., Inc., consisted of five theatres and what is commonly referred to as ‘the Butter Company’. Within five years of Virgil's death, the company was split up and the three share holders chose to own and operate the theatres. Art Anderson became sole proprietor of what is now called Odell's, ‘the Butter Company.’

In 2001, Art Anderson sold Odell's to his son Arthur M. Anderson and his wife Vikki B. Anderson.

== Products ==
- Anhydrous Butterfat
- Supur Kist Two
- Classic Blend Popping Oil
- Premium Canola Popping Oil
- Fluffy Pop – Coconut Popping Oil
- Golden Sunflower Popping Oil
- Chef's Butter
