= Gelato Italia =

British frozen dessert company

- Industry: Retail, Foodservice & Wholesale
- Founder: Antonio Siciliani & Stephen Siciliani
- Headquarters: Essex, United Kingdom
- Products: Gelato & Ice Cream, Sorbet, Slush (beverage) & Frozen Yogurt
- Website: www.gelatoitalia.co.uk

Gelato Italia is a British company producing high-end Italian frozen desserts. Their factory is based in Southend-on-Sea, Essex. Gelato Italia operate nationally in the UK with ice cream vans, kiosks and parlours.

Founded in 2011, the company started producing gelato.

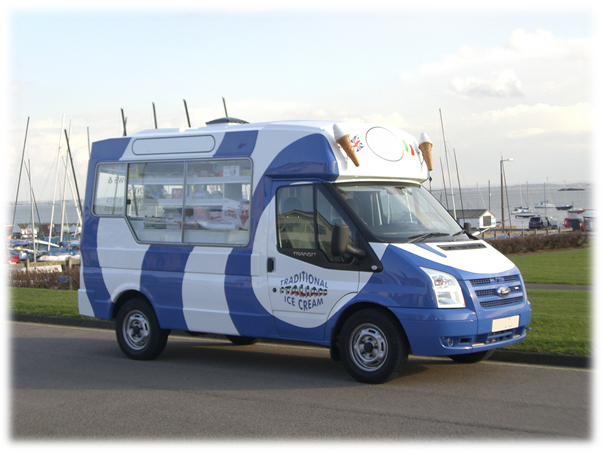
Gelato Italia Ice Cream Van

== Products ==
Gelato Italia produces over thirty different flavours of gelato, made of milk, water and a little cream only. Gelato Italia produces gelato, ice cream, sorbet, granita slush ice, and frozen yogurt. The company sells nationally to wholesalers, restaurants, grocery stores and ice cream parlours.
