= Indykpol =

Indykpol S.A.
- Company type: Public (WSE: IND)
- Founded: Olsztyn, Poland (1991)
- Headquarters: Olsztyn, Poland
- Key people: Piotr Kulikowski Chairman
- Products: Meat
- Revenue: ▲PLN 858.9 million (2010)
- Number of employees: 1521 (2008)
- Website: www.indykpol.pl

Indykpol is one of the largest poultry processors and the largest turkey processor in Poland. It is headquartered in Olsztyn. The company was founded in 1991 as the private successor of the state-owned corporation Olsztyńskie Zakłady Drobiarskie. In 1993, it was transformed into a joint-stock company. Since October 12, 1994, it has been listed on the Warsaw Stock Exchange.
