= Kiolbassa =

American company

Kiolbassa is an American sausage processing, packaging, and distribution company based in San Antonio, Texas. Kiolbassa is family-owned and has been in business since 1949.

== History ==
Rufus and Juanita Kiolbassa founded the company in 1949 on San Antonio's West side, where the sausage is still produced. It was originally called the Kiolbassa Provision Company.

Rufus died in 1960 at the age of 45, leaving the company to his wife and three children. His son, Robert, dropped out of college to run the company starting in 1960. Robert's son, Michael joined the company in 1987 and became the company president in 2021 after the death of Robert. During his tenure, Kiolbassa has become the highest grossing premium sausage manufacturer in Texas.

== Products ==
Kiolbassa specializes in beef sausages. It is made with whole-muscle meat and does not contain any offal meats, cereals, fillers, or chemicals.

Kiolbassa has a large market share throughout Texas and appears in 47/50 states as well as Mexico.
