= ZhL =

Ukrainian confectionery manufacturer

Zhytomyr confectionery
- Native name: ЖЛ
- Company type: Additional Liability Company (ALC)
- Industry: Food industry
- Founded: 1944
- Headquarters: Zhytomyr, Ukraine
- Products: Chocolate bars, boxed sweets
- Number of employees: 1600
- Website: https://zl.com.ua

Zhytomyr confectionery ("ZhL"), also referred to as "ALC ZhL," is a part of Confectionery Factory ZhL Group, a Ukrainian manufacturer of confectionery products. The factory was founded in 1994. ALC ZhL is the successor of CJSC (“Zhytomyrski Lasoshchi”;Ukrainian: Житомирські Ласощі).

== Products and Trademarks ==
ZhL produces boxed sweets, chocolate bars, glazed and non-glazed sweets, chocolate snacks, chocolate wafer sweets, biscuits, wafers, fudge, cereal bars and cereal desserts in both yogurt and sugar-free products. Production capacity is more than 80,000 tons per year. Products are manufactured under four Trademarks: ZhL, Doma, Optimix and Stevix. In 2012, ZhL was certified "Halal" a portion of its range. Zhytomyr Confectionery Factory produces a wide range of dietary products and products for children.

== Export markets ==
ZhL exports to 26 countries. Among them are the CIS member countries, countries EC, the Middle East, USA, China and New Zealand.
