= Yeolmae Food =

South Korean food company

- Founded: 1991; 35 years ago
- Headquarters: Gunpo Gyeonggi Province, South Korea

Korean name
- Hangul: 열매식품
- Hanja: 열매食品
- RR: Yeolmae sikpum
- MR: Yŏlmae sikp'um

Yeolmae Food (Korean: 열매식품) is a food company. Its headquarters are located in Gunpo Gyeonggi Province, Korea. Established in 1991, it manufactures many home food products. It has agency offices in Suwon, Gwangju, Busan, Daegu.

== History ==
- 1991:Yeolmae Food established
- 1993:Change the corporation from Yeolmae Food Co., Ltd., Participate in Seoul World Food Exhibition
- 1994:Participate in Japan World Food Exhibition, Member of Korea Food Processing Association
- 1995:Participate in Seoul World Food Exhibition
- 1996:Purchase the Headquarter body
- 1997:Participate in Taipei, Chinese World Food Exhibition, Export US$500,000.00
- 1998:Export to LA in US, Taipei / US$800,000.00
- 1999:Participate in Hong Kong, Japan, China World Food Exhibition, Export to China, Taipei / US$2,000,000.00
- 2000:Participate in Singapore World Food Exhibition, Participate in Taipei World Food Exhibition, Planning to participate in Hong Kong World Food Exhibition, Export to Singapore, Taiwan, China / US$2,100,000.00
- 2001:Export to Singapore, Taiwan, China, Malaysia / US$2,200,000.00
- 2002:Export to Canada, Japan, Singapore, Taiwan / US$2,350,000.00, Acquired ISO 9001 Certification

== Business count ==
- 2001:$22,000,000.00
- 2002:$23,500,000.00
- 2003:$26,000,000.00

== Exportation ==
- Taiwan, U.S., Singapore, China, Malaysia, Canada, Japan, Australia, Europe and South America

== Products ==
- Jomi Kim
- Kimbap Kim
- Miyeok
- Gift Set
- Sesame & Food Oil
- Sesame
