= Dachan Food (Asia) =

Chinese food company

Dachan Food (Asia) Limited 大成食品(亞洲)有限公司
- Company type: Privately owned company (Taiwanese enterprise)
- Industry: Foods
- Founded: 1995
- Headquarters: Hong Kong
- Area served: China
- Key people: Chairman: Han Jia-Hwan
- Products: Chicken meat
- Parent: Dachan Great Wall Enterprise
- Website: Dachan Food (Asia) Limited

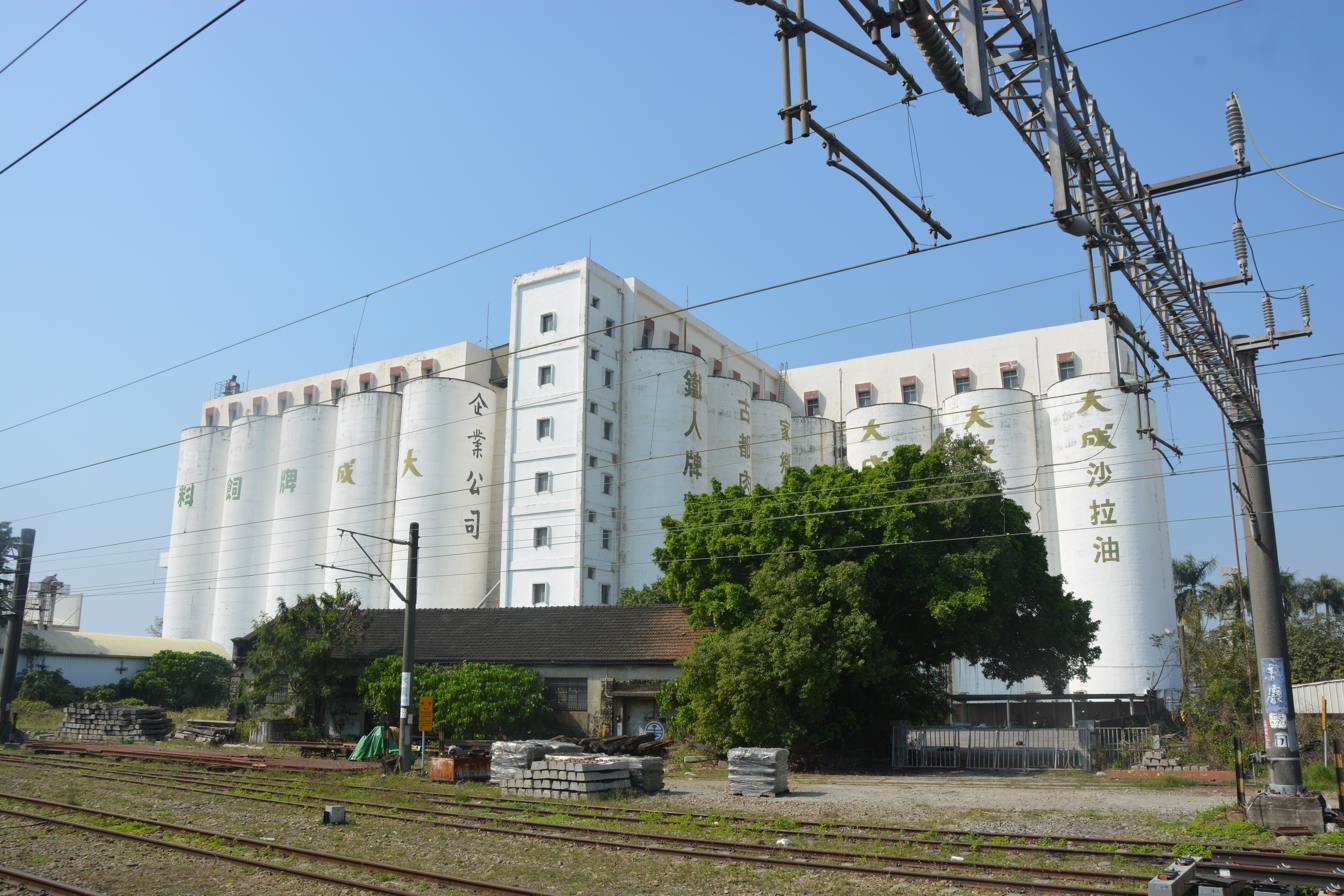
A salad oil factory of Dachan next to Yongkang railway station in Tainan.

Dachan Food (Asia) Limited (SEHK: 3999) is one of the largest chicken meat products and feeds suppliers in China. It is a mainland China-based subsidiary of Taiwan-based Dachan Great Wall Enterprise. It engages in animal feed production, chicken meat processing, and supply of ultra-processed food. Kentucky Fried Chicken and McDonald's are its major clients.

The company is headquartered in Hong Kong with production plants in Dalian, Liaoning. It was listed on the Hong Kong Stock Exchange in 2007.
