= Oakhouse Foods =

Home meals service founded in the United Kingdom

Oakhouse Foods is a home meals service delivering frozen ready meals. The business was founded in the UK in 1994.

== Company information ==
A home meals service delivering frozen meals and desserts throughout the UK, the service is operated by a network of 21 regional distributors and is aimed primarily at those who find shopping or cooking for themselves a challenge, mainly the elderly. Delivery is made free of charge in refrigerated vehicles by uniformed drivers. Oakhouse Foods works with organisations involved in caring for the elderly and disabled including providing free food tastings and demonstrations for occupational therapists, care associations, sheltered housing associations and hospitals.

The service caters for people with wide range of diets including gluten free, diabetic, low fat, low calorie and vegetarian. A range of "Free From" lists is also available detailing dishes that are free from specific ingredients and full nutritional information is available for all dishes. A range of "Mini Meals" is also available for those with smaller appetites.
