= Burren Smokehouse =

Irish fish company

Coordinates: 53°1′40.81″N 9°17′31.3″W

The Burren Smokehouse is an Irish family-run producer of smoked fish.

== History ==
The company was established in 1989, on Kincora Road, Lisdoonvarna, County Clare, by Peter and Birgitta Curtin. The smokehouse started with the smoking and curing of salmon and later branched out into mackerel, trout and eel. Cheese was also added. According to Good Food Ireland, it is a "highly acclaimed, award winning traditional smokehouse".

The company also runs a visitor centre, and it is one of the organizers and participants of the yearly Burren Slow Food Festival.

== Awards ==
The Smokehouse has won several awards and certifications for his products. Amongst others, they have won:

- Best Organic Retail Product award category in the National Organic Awards 2010
- Great Taste Awards 2010 (three two-star gold medals with just four entries among a total over 6000)
- Seafood Exporter Award

The Burren Smokehouse was one of the suppliers of the State Banquet during the visit of Elizabeth II to Ireland.

== Health risk and product recalls ==
In March 2011 the Smokehouse had to recall a batch of smoked salmon, due to the presence of low levels of Listeria monocytogenes. The recall was a precautionary measure. In March 2020, February 2022 and June 2024, the same happened.

In February 2025 Burren Smokehouse had to recall several batches of seafood and destroy them. According to the FSAI:

the activities handling, processing, disposal, manufacturing, storage, distribution or selling of the affected batches are likely to involve a serious risk to public health.

.
