= Ferguson Plarre Bakehouses =

Bakeries of Australia

Ferguson Plarre's Bakehouse
- Company type: Franchise
- Industry: Bakery
- Founded: 1901; 125 years ago
- Founder: Otto Plarre, Albert & Eliza Ferguson
- Headquarters: 35 Harrick Road, Keilor Park, Victoria, Australia
- Number of locations: 84
- Area served: Australia
- Key people: Steve Plarre (CEO)
- Products: Cakes, pastries, meat pies
- Website: www.fergusonplarre.com.au

Ferguson Plarre's Bakehouse is a family owned and operated bakery business based in Melbourne, Australia. The business began as two separate entities (Ferguson's Cakes and Plarre's Cakes) with the families coming together to form Ferguson Plarre Bakehouses in 1980. Ferguson Plarre now has 86 stores across Victoria. In 2012, members of the Plarre family bought out the Ferguson's stake and the business remains owned and operated by the Plarre family with Steve Plarre as CEO. There are only a small number of company owned stores now as the majority of stores are run by franchisees.

The bakery's family history has links to many of Melbourne's culinary institutions (such as Jimmy Watsons). One of its best-known outlets is in Melbourne's Queen Victoria Market, where locals have purchased the bakery's cakes and pastries for decades.

More recently the brand introduced a vegan pastry range to meet the demands of the Australian Customer. In 2021, Plarre Foods also began to sell a range of frozen pies and pastries in supermarkets under the Pie Society brand.

== History ==
Ferguson Plarre Bakehouses is a family owned and operated business. The Fergusons commenced their bakery business in 1901 and the Plarres in 1911. Both businesses focused mostly in the Northern and Western suburbs of Melbourne, Australia. After decades as separate businesses they merged in 1980 to become 'Ferguson Plarre Bakehouses'. The Ferguson family exited the business in 2012 and Plarre family members now run it.

In the early 1990s, Ferguson Plarre introduced their version of a Cornish Pasty named the Tiddly Oggie, which is a Cornish phrase for "a proper pasty".

== Product lines ==
- Meat Pies
- Sausage Rolls
- Tiddly Oggies (Pasties)
- Vegan Pies
- Cakes
- Slices
- Birthday Cakes
- Wedding Cakes
- Donuts
- Sandwiches
- Coffee
- Milkshakes

== See also ==
- List of bakeries
- List of brand name breads
- List of restaurant chains in Australia
