= Chocolates Sönksen =

Brazilian chocolate company

- A picture of the factory on Vergueiro Street in 1959
- Formerly: La Bonbonniere
- Type: Private
- Industry: Food industry
- Founded: 1887; 139 years ago in São Paulo, Brazil
- Founder: Alfredo Richter
- Defunct: 1983
- Fate: Bankruptcy
- Products: Chocolate and candies
- Owner: Sönksen family, Falchi family and Ofner

Chocolates Sönksen, previously named La Bonbonniere, was one of the first chocolate factories in Brazil. Created by Alfredo Richter in 1887, the family company was controlled by his wife and children after his death in 1912, where it got its new identity as "Sönksen".

It quickly became one of the biggest companies of Brazil's sweet sector, and in 1924 it became an anonymous society, being presided over the Falchi family and Ofner's representatives.

Despite its previous success, the company began declining during the 70s, where the rise of new competitors, distribution problems, and changes in São Paulo's industrial parks made it declare bankruptcy in 1983.

On 5 September 1983, a fire of unknown cause destroyed part of the factory, causing millions in losses. The fire happened during the eviction process, which was being confronted by the old employees. It led to the accusation that the employees were to be blamed for the losses, but the investigation was inconclusive.

== History ==
The factory, originally named La Bonbonniere, was founded in 1887 by Alfredo Richter at Líbero Badaró Stret, Central Zone of São Paulo. It was one of the first chocolate factories of Brazil.

In 1912, after Richter's death, his wife Alwine Sophia Sönksen took over the family business. Afterwards, her children began managing the factory under the name of Christian Sönksen & Cia. The factory was moved to a rented building on Vergueiro Street, which was acquired by the company in 1922. In 1924, its corporate name changed to Sönksen Irmãos & Cia and in 1948 it became an anonymous society, named Sönksen Produtos Alimentícios S.A. In 1958, the company inaugurated a store on 24 de maio Street.

Chocolates Sönksen during the 70s, in front of the construction work of the Line 1 of the São Paulo Metro.

Up until the 70s, Sönksen was one of the main companies of the chocolate market in Brazil, losing only to Kopenhagen, but it was soon put on sale and opened a voluntary arrangement in 1977, officially declaring bankruptcy in 1983. Its sudden downfall happened for several reasons. The first was the emergence of new competitors in the market segment, such as Nestlé, Lacta and Garoto. Sönksen's products were more expensive some were sold only at the factory, which led to lower sales. Other important factors were that the company wasn't under the direct management of the Sönksen family, being presided over the Falchi family and Ofner's representatives. Two of the factory presidents were José Cilhas de Oliveira e Silva and Petter Schone. São Paulo was also quickly reshaping its industrial park as part of its modernization process. The company bought expensive machinery trying to modernize their industrial process and was experiencing distribution problems. Even during its crisis, it dominated about 30% of the market.

On 5 September 1983, several employees were protesting for their delayed wages, evaluated between CR$ 50 and 70 million, and made a human chain to stop the machinery from being taken away during the eviction process. During the struggle, at about 10:30 a.m., a fire began, which destroyed part of the factory. An easter egg making machine evaluated at CR$ 100 million was destroyed, and part of the roof fell. The ex-president of the factory accused the employees of starting the fire, which was vehemently denied. The cause of the fire was never discovered.

== Procuts ==
Some of Sönksen's best sold products were the chocolate bunnies and bears. The bears, nicknamed "Urso Branco" (White Bear) and "Urso Marrom" (Brown Bear), were respectively made out of white chocolate and milk chocolate. Another famous producs were its língua de gato and its sour and barley candy. Its jam fondant bonbon was specially targeted to the upper class.

The factory was also known for producing thematic candies, something unheard in Brazil at a time. Besides the easter eggs, they've also produced candies for Christmas, Mother's Day and Dia dos Namorados.

== Branding ==
Sönksen is known for its visual identity. Even after its bankruptcy, it's logo kept being of interest from a marketing perspective and up until 2014 its brand was still disputed at the National Institute of Industrial Property. Its products were considered sophisticated and its packing was used as house decoration.

Its advertisements affirmed that chocolate was nutritious, and brought forth alleged scientific and medical studies to back its allegations up.
