= Born Feinkost =

Food manufacturer from Erfurt, Germany

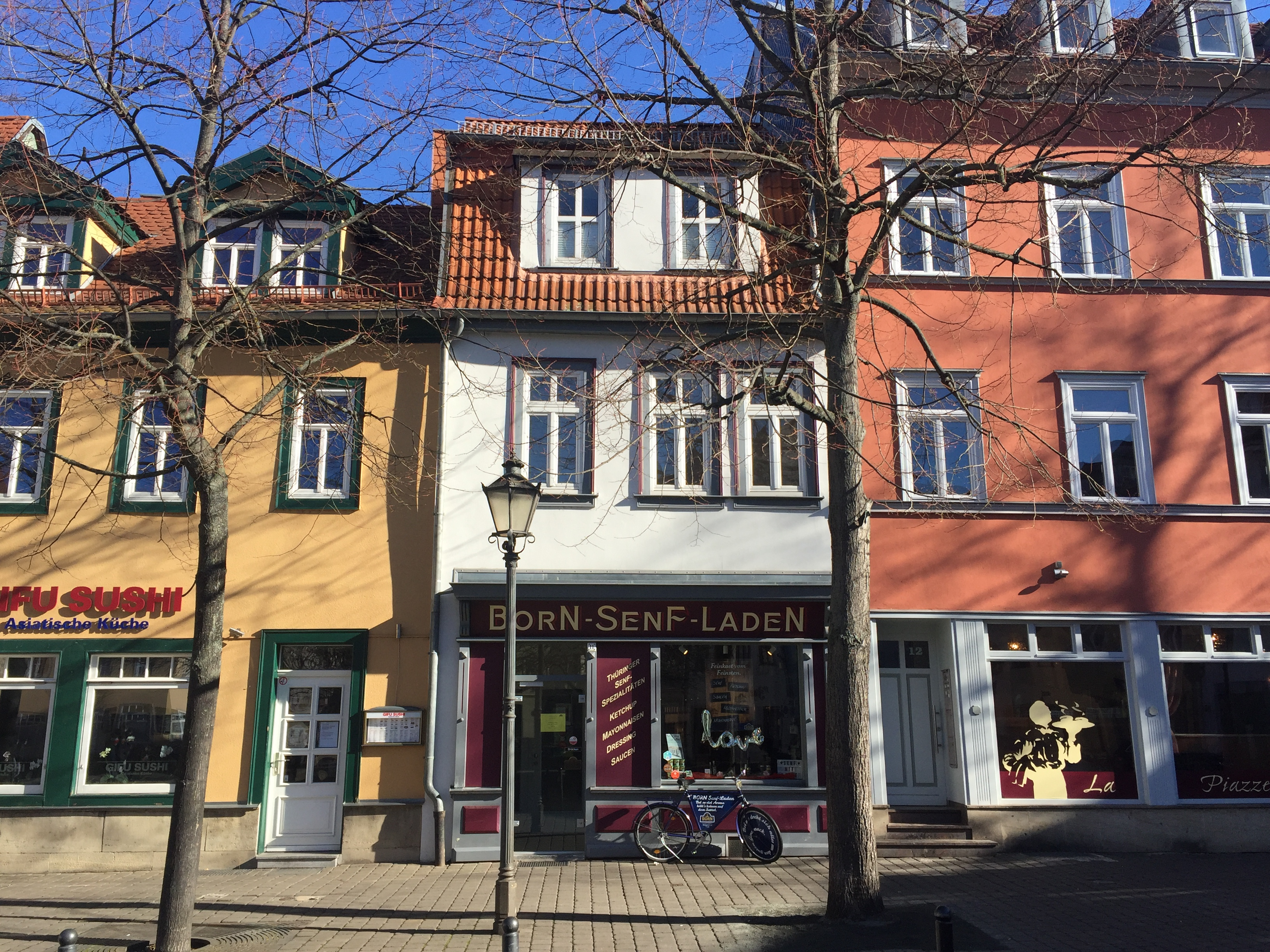
Born mustard shop and museum at Wenigenmarkt 11 in Erfurt, 2019

Born Feinkost GmbH is a food company from Erfurt, Germany. It is mainly known for its mustard, which is traditionally served accompanying Thüringer Bratwurst (Thuringian sausage).

== History ==
In 1820 the brothers Wilhelm and Luis Born founded a factory in Erfurt-Ilversgehofen, producing mustard, vinegar and other food products. The company was owned by the family until the 1970s, when they were nationalized by the GDR government. Since 1990 it has been privately owned again. Executive Officer is Hans-Dieter Büttner. At the moment there are 50 employees.

== Products ==
Besides several kinds of mustard, the company produces ketchup, vinegar, horseradish condiments, mayonnaise as well as different salad dressing and sauces. Born mustard and ketchup can be found at nearly every outlet selling Bratwurst in Thuringia.

== Born-Senf-Museum ==
Born Feinkost GmbH runs a mustard shop and museum at the Wenigemarkt in Erfurt, showing the history of mustard and the brand as well as selling mustard specialties and freshly draught (draft) mustard.
