= Kaslink Foods =

Finnish dairy company

Kaslink Foods Ltd
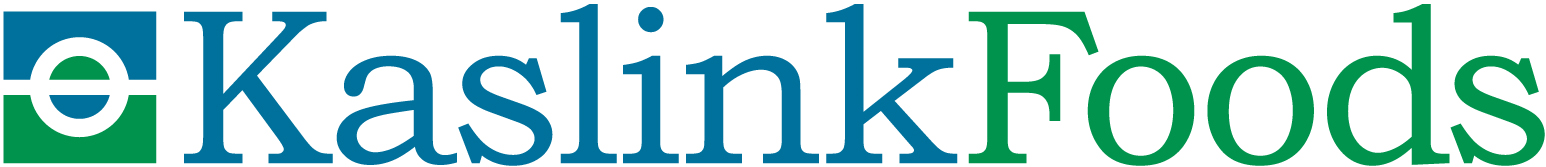
- Company type: Limited company
- Industry: Dairy
- Founded: 2001
- Headquarters: Kouvola, Finland
- Area served: Finland
- Key people: Raino Kukkonen (Founder) Thomas Kukkonen (Managing Director)
- Revenue: ▲56.1 million € (2015)
- Number of employees: 125 (as of 2016)
- Website: www.kaslink.fi

Kaslink Foods Ltd, founded in the year of 2001, is a Finnish dairy company based in Kouvola, Finland. The company specializes in milk and cream-based products, as well as a variety of sauces and sauce bases.

Kaslink is the largest privately owned dairy business in Finland.

== Sources ==
- Kaslink Foodsin vuosikertomus
- 2012 Kaslink Foodsin Internetsivut
