= Gülsan =

Turkish food company

Gülsan is a Turkish food manufacturing company established in 1948. The company is based in the industrial zone of Kayseri. The company produces jam, marmalade and halva while frozen fruits and vegetables, fruit concentrate and paste are produced through one of Gülsan's brands, Ozgul Gida A.S. Frozen products are processed with individual quickly freezing (IQF) systems and stored in the cooling store.

In 1999, the factory in Nevşehir joined Gülsan. The factory produces vinegar and boiled grape juice. The following year, Gülsan–Meyve Fruit Juice Factory joined Gülsan. The factory produces fruit nectar. Together with these, Gülsan aims to set up a fruit city within its structure.
