= List of dairy product companies in the United States =

This is a list of dairy product companies in the United States. A dairy product is food produced from the milk of mammals. Dairy products are usually high energy-yielding food products. A production plant for the processing of milk is called a dairy or a dairy factory.

== Dairy product companies in the United States ==
=== A ===
- All American Foods
- Alpenrose Dairy
- Alta Dena
- Alto Dairy Cooperative
- Aurora Organic Dairy
- Anderson Erickson Dairy

=== B ===
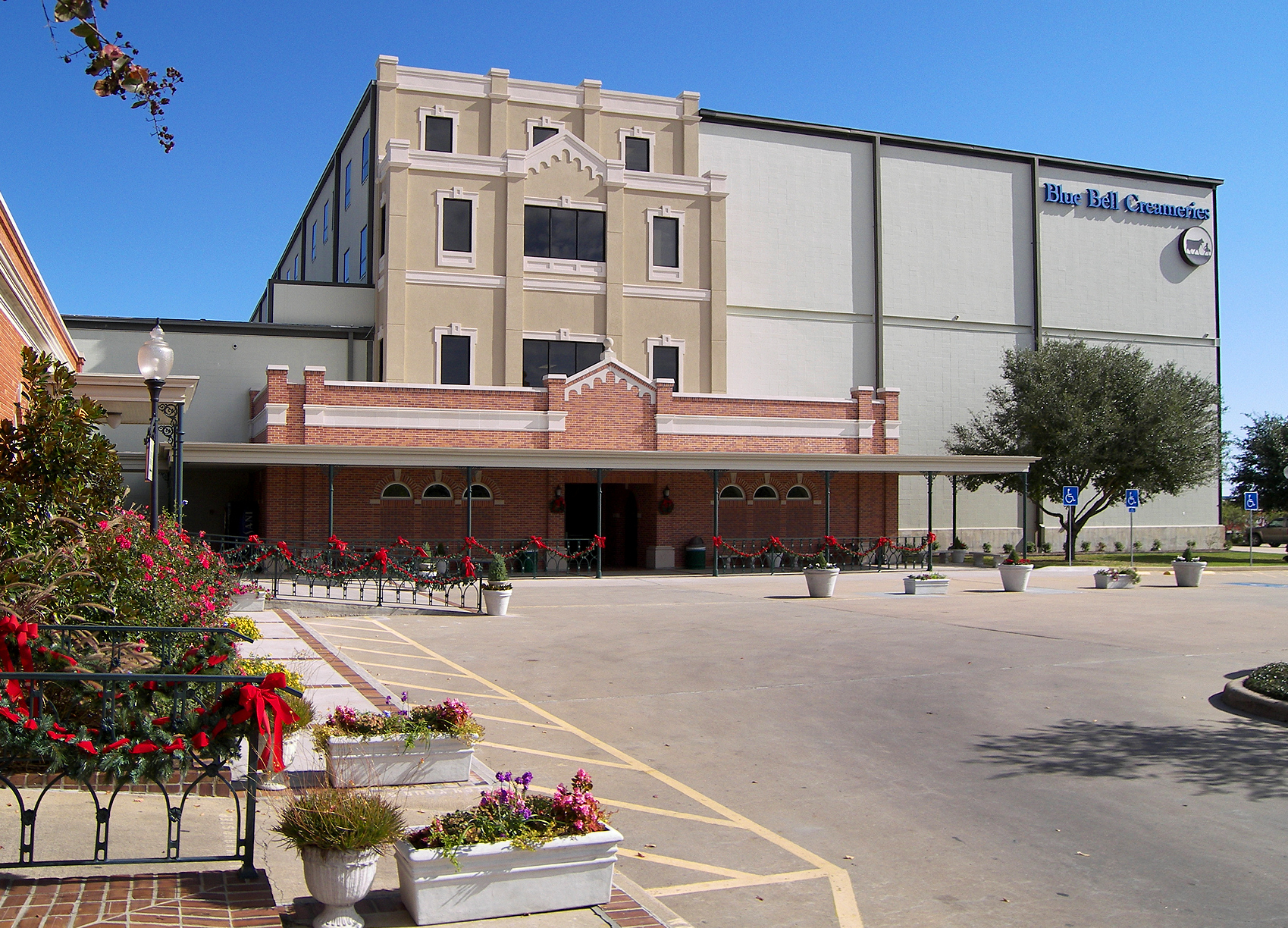
The Blue Bell Creameries factory in Brenham, Texas

- Beatrice Foods
- Bittersweet Plantation Dairy
- Blue Bell Creameries
- Blue Bunny
- Blue Valley Creamery Company
- Borden Dairy
- Braum's
- Brewster Dairy
- Broughton Foods Company
- Byrne Dairy
- BelGioioso Cheese Inc.

=== C ===
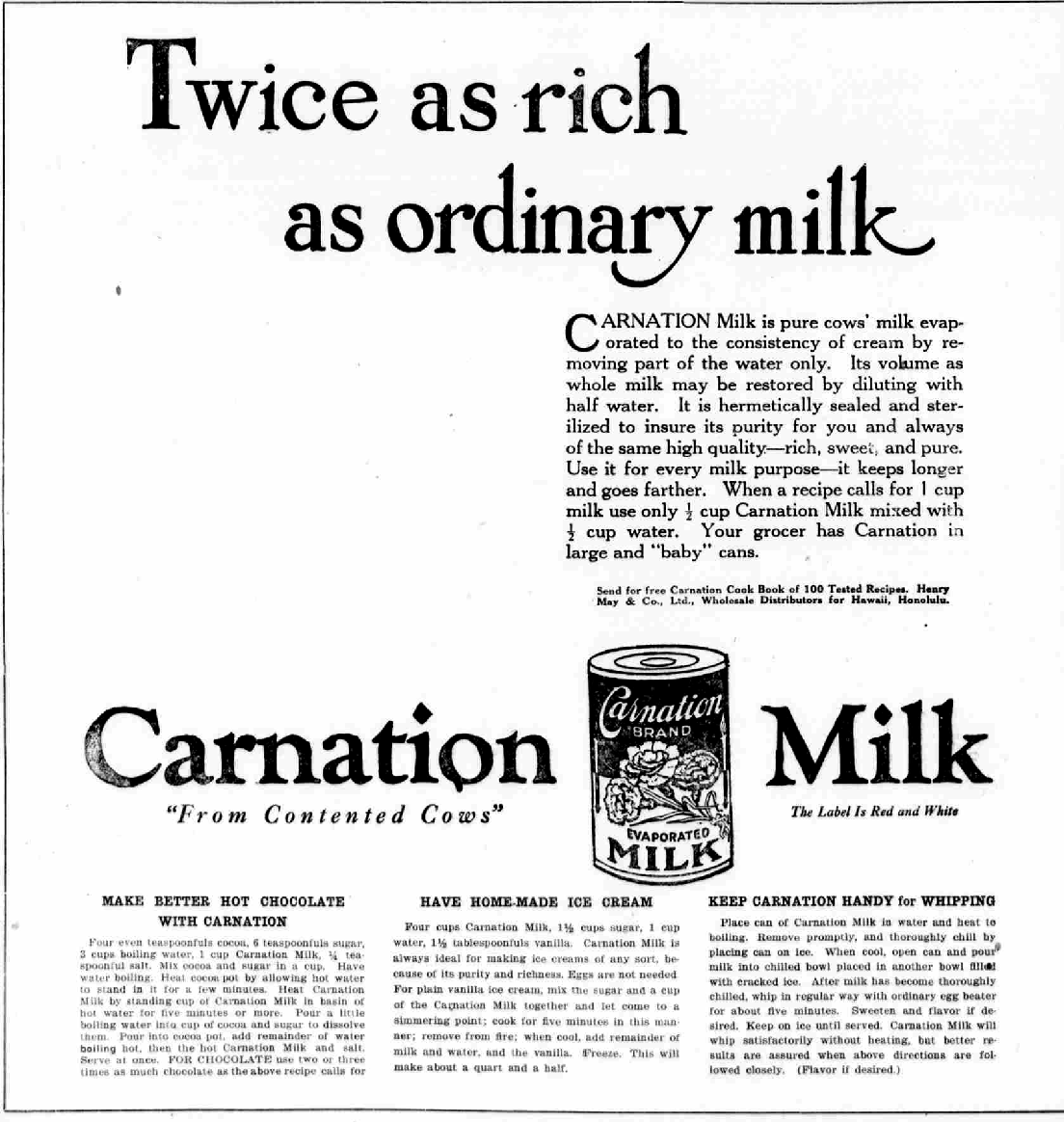
A newspaper advertisement for Carnation Evaporated Milk, 1921

- Capriole Goat Cheese
- Carnation – founded as an evaporated milk company in 1899
- Carvel
- Cass-Clay
- Chaseholm Farm Creamery
- Cielo
- Clover Stornetta Farms
- Cooksville Cheese Factory
- Coolhaus
- Cornell Dairy
- Cypress Grove Chevre
- Cypress Point Creamery

=== D ===
- Dairy Farmers of America – a national milk marketing cooperative that is owned by and serves nearly 15,000 dairy farmer-members, representing more than 9,000 dairy farms in 48 states
- Dairylea Cooperative Inc.
- Danone
- Darigold
- DCI Cheese Company
- Dean Foods
- DF Ingredients
- Dreyer's

=== E ===
- Eagle Brand
- Ellsworth Cooperative Creamery – a producer of cheese curds located in Ellsworth, Wisconsin that was established in 1910
- Elmhurst Dairy

=== F ===
- Fairmount Food Group
- Ferndale Dairies
- Foster Farms Dairy
- Flavors Baskin-Robbins
- Friendship Dairies

=== G ===
- Galliker's
- Garelick Farms
- The Greek Gods
- Gustafson's Farm

=== H ===
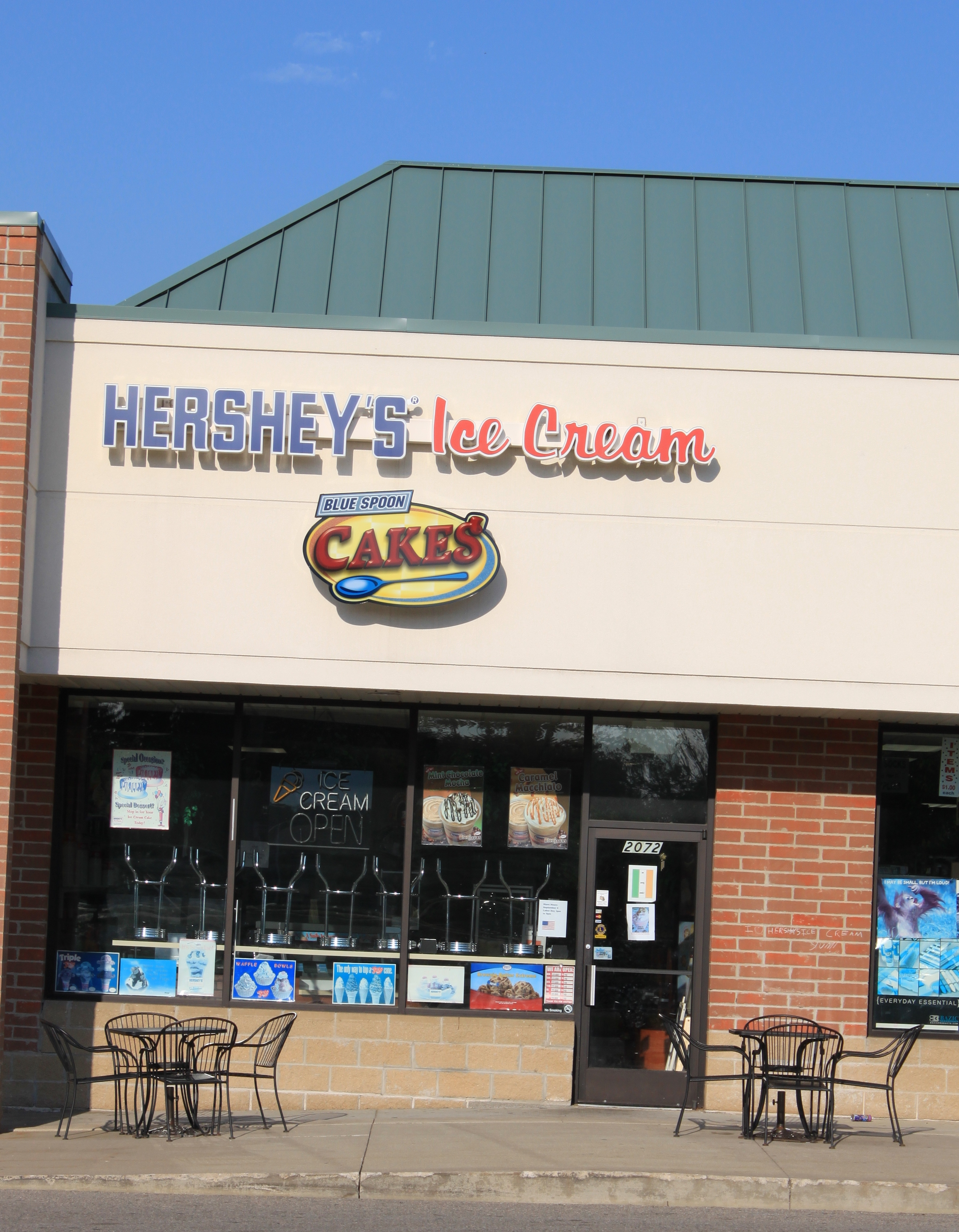
A Hershey's ice cream shop in Ypsilanti Township, Michigan

- Happy Cow Creamery
- Hershey Creamery Company – a creamery that produces Hershey's brand ice cream.
- Hey Brothers Ice Cream
- Hilmar Cheese Company
- Horizon Organic
- HP Hood
- Humboldt Creamery

=== I ===
- Isaly's

=== J ===
- Jackson Ice Cream Company
- Joseph Gallo Farms – a large family-owned dairy operation that is prominent in California’s dairy industry; based in Livingston, California
- Junket

=== K ===
- Kemps
- Killer Shake
- Kraft Heinz – a result of the merger of Kraft Foods with Heinz

=== L ===
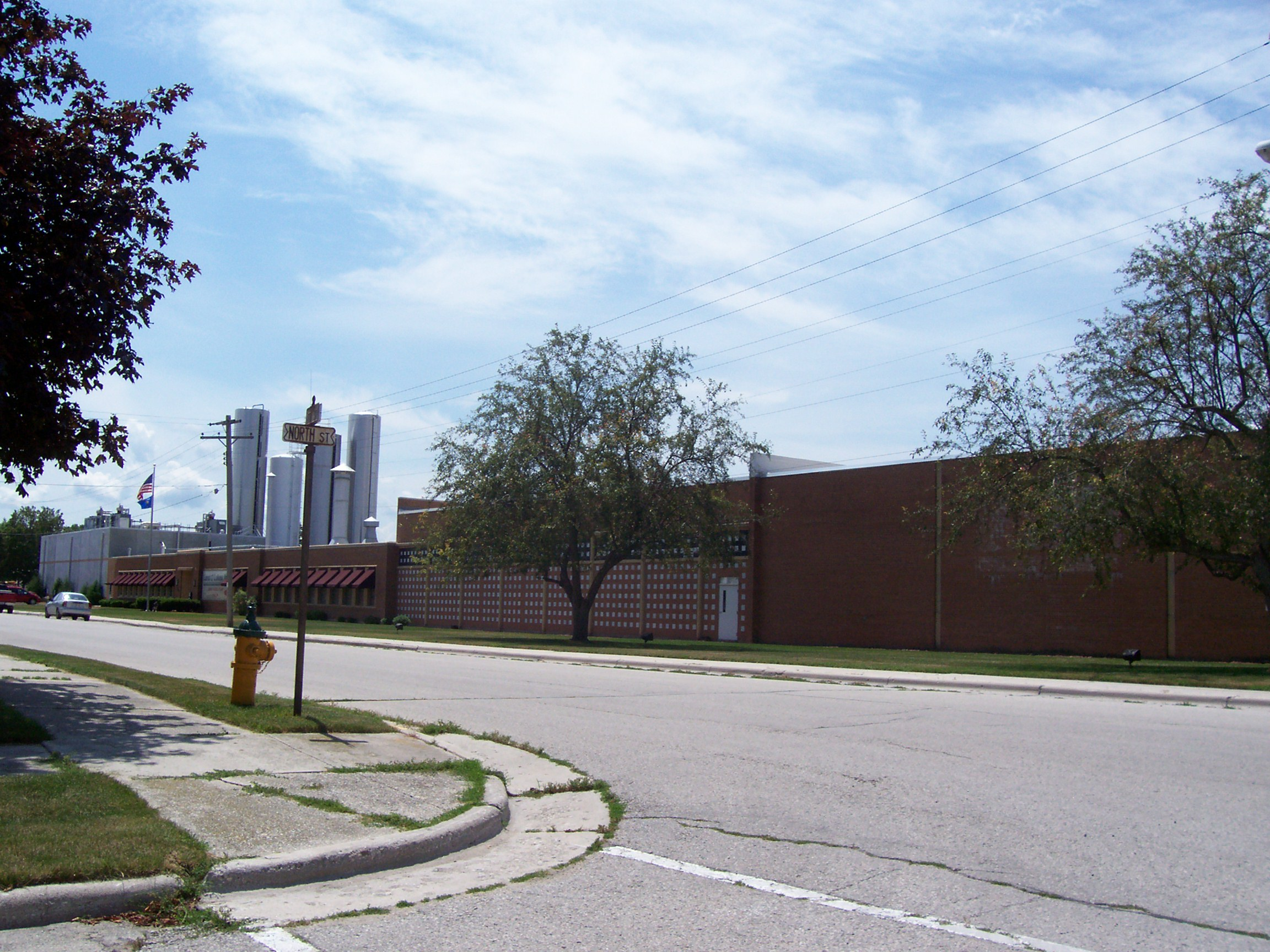
A Land O'Lakes processing plant in Kiel, Wisconsin

- Land O'Lakes – a member-owned agricultural cooperative based in the Minneapolis-St. Paul suburb of Arden Hills, Minnesota
- Louis Trauth Dairy
- Leprino Foods

=== M ===
- Maine's Own Organic Milk Company
- Marin French Cheese Company
- Mayfield Dairy
- Maytag Dairy Farms – established in 1941 by Frederick Louis Maytag II and based in Newton, Iowa, it manufactures blue cheese and other cheeses
- Meadow Gold Dairies
- Murray's Cheese
- Medosweet Farms

=== O ===
- Oakhurst Dairy
- Oberweis Dairy
- Organic Valley

=== P ===
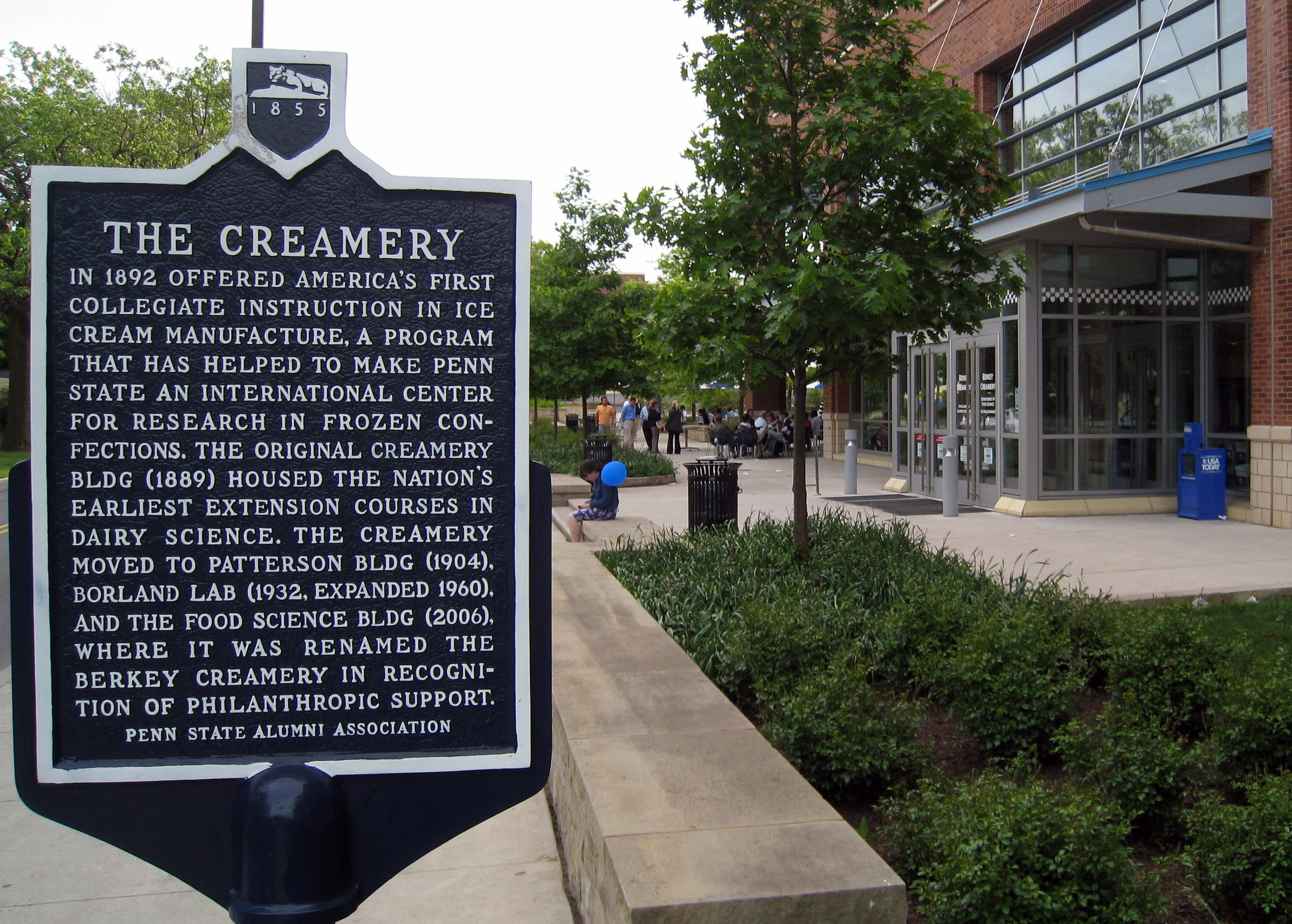
Information plaque for the Penn State University Creamery

- Pacific Coast Condensed Milk Company
- Penn State University Creamery
- Pet, Inc.
- Pierre's Ice Cream Company
- Point Reyes Farmstead Cheese Company
- Prairie Farms Dairy – a dairy cooperative operating out of Carlinville
- Purity Dairies

=== R ===
- Rogue Creamery, Since 2002, an artisan cheese operation located in Oregon, winner of 30 international and over 50 national cheese-making awards.
- Rockview Farms

Rhody Fresh

=== S ===
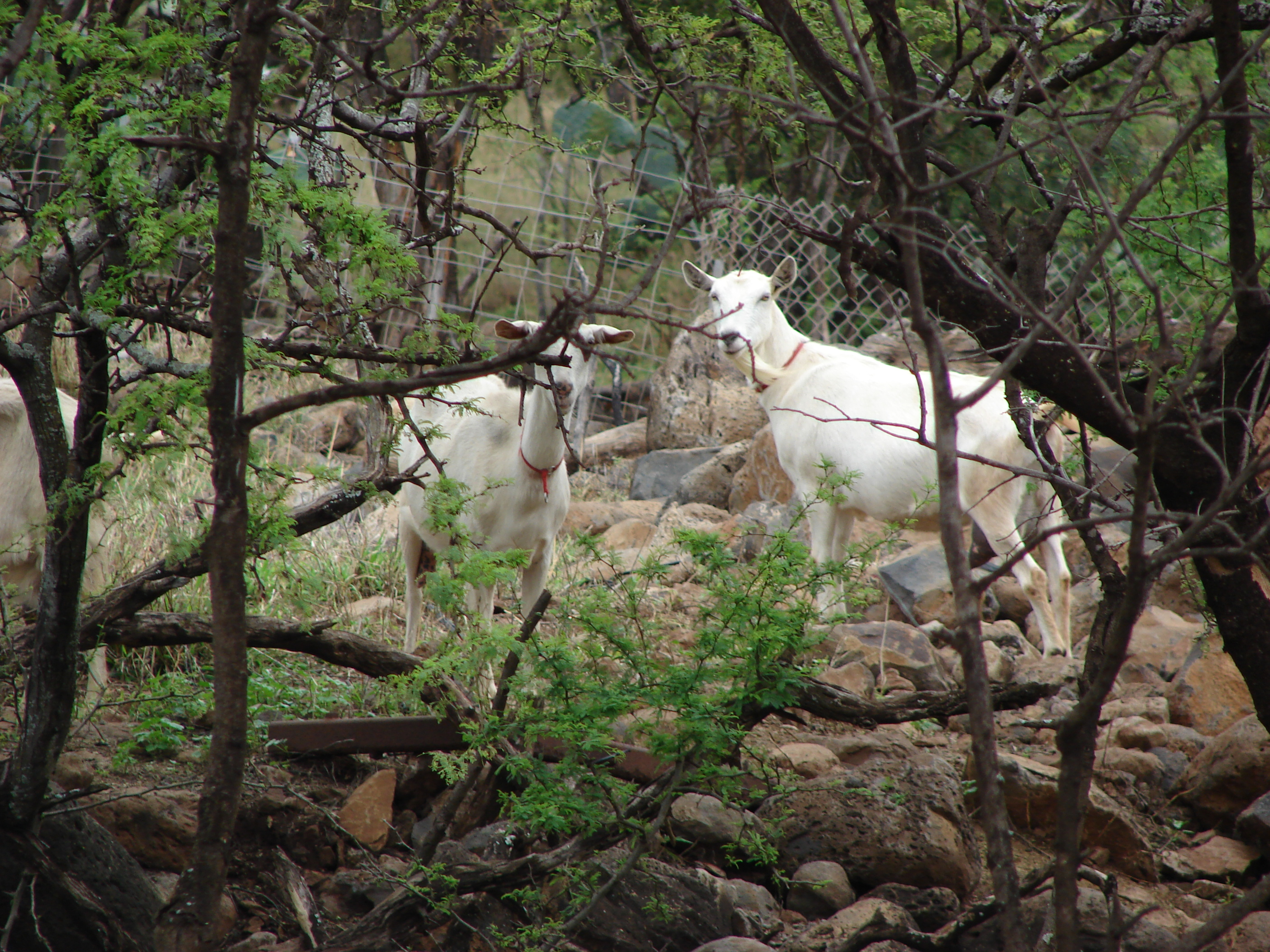
Goats at the Surfing Goat Dairy

- Saputo Inc.
- Sargento − one of the largest privately held companies in the United States, and one of the largest retail cheese companies in the U.S.
- Schoep's Ice Cream
- Schreiber Foods
- Schuman Cheese
- Shamrock Farms
- Sheffield Farms
- Siggi's Dairy
- Smiling Hill Farm
- Smith Dairy
- Sorrento Lactalis
- Stewart's Shops
- Stonyfield Farm
- Straus Family Creamery
- Surfing Goat Dairy
- Sweet Grass Dairy

=== T ===
- T. G. Lee Dairy
- Tillamook Cheese
- Tuscan Dairy Farms
- Turkey Hill Dairy

=== U ===
- United Dairy Farmers – a chain of shops offering ice cream and other dairy products; has stores throughout the greater Cincinnati, Ohio area, as well as Dayton and Columbus

=== V ===
- Volleman's Family Farm – A vertical integrated milk company, controlling every aspect of making milk and shipping their milk in returnable glass bottles to their customers. Volleman's offers a diversity of flavors in different sizes.

=== W ===
- Wainwright Dairy
- Waldrep Dairy Farm
- Winchester Cheese Company
- Winder Farms
- Winter Park Dairy
- Wawa Food Markets 1890, George Wood, a businessperson from New Jersey, moved to Delaware County, Pennsylvania; it was here that he began the Wawa Dairy Farm.

=== Y ===
- Yakult USA
- Yancey's Fancy
- Yarnell Ice Cream Co.

== See also ==
- Dairy farming
- List of brand name food products
- List of cheesemakers
- List of dairy products
- List of food companies
