= Hey Brother (disambiguation) =

"Hey Brother" is a 2013 song by Avicii.

Hey Brother may also refer to:

- "Hey Brother", 1968 single by Billy Preston from the album That's the Way God Planned It
- "Hey Brother", 1981 single by Chanels
- "Hey Brother", 1997 song by Adriana Evans on her album Adriana Evans
- "Hey Brother", 2004 song by Camper Van Beethoven from the album New Roman Times
- "Hey Brother", 2006 Japanese song by Rip Slyme used in the film Mamiya kyodai
- "Hey Brother", 2026 song by Charlie Puth from the album Whatever's Clever!

== See also ==
- Hey Brothers Ice Cream, a Sterling, Illinois-based milk and ice cream producer throughout northwestern Illinois during most of the 20th century
- "Hey, brother, pour the wine!" 1954 song by Ross Bagdasarian, sung by various artists including Dean Martin
- Hey, Brother, Pour the Wine, 1964 compilation album by Capitol Records released after Dean Martin moved to Reprise Records
- Hey Bro, 2015 Indian Hindi-language film
