= Fairmount Food Group =

Food services company

Fairmount Food Group, LLC (FFG) is a food industrial company headquartered in Dallas, Texas. Established in 2003 by Bing Graffunder (CEO) and Sam Hillin (CFO), the company began with an initial $200 million in equity financing from GTCR Golder Rauner with the purpose of buying out growth companies in the industry.

== Companies ==
As of 2007, the portfolio of companies (all of them being specialty and deli-style cheese companies) which continue to operate under their own identities include:

- DCI Cheese Company (acquired April 2005), (sold 2011)
- Green Bay Cheese Company (acq. February 2006),
- G&G Foods (acq. June 2006),
- Swissrose International (acq. August 2006)
- Advantage Foods (Advantage International Foods Corporation, acquired from ConAgra, Omaha, Nebraska in September 2007).

Other acquisitions include Carter/Meister LLC (a supplier for DCI Cheese). These acquisitions have made Fairmount Food Group one of the largest importers and marketers of specialty and deli-style cheese in the United States.

== See also ==
- List of dairy product companies in the United States
