= SmithFoods =

American food company

SmithFoods is a regional maker of dairy products, beverages, and ice cream headquartered in Orrville, Ohio. The company sells products under two major brands, Smith's and Ruggles, as well as private label brands, for both retail and wholesale distribution.

The company has two plants: one in Orrville, Ohio, and the other in Richmond, Indiana, and products include cottage cheese, sour cream and dips, iced teas, juices, and punches, in addition to milk and ice cream.

== History ==
Brothers John and Peter Schmid bought a small dairy farm on the first day of 1909. The operation initially consisted of two horses, two wagons, a hand-cranked ice cream maker, and a five-gallon freezer that used ice cut from a nearby pond in winter. The name changed several times in the early years, but the company would eventually be known as Smith Dairy.

The Dairy made key operational advancements in the 1920s. One such innovation, mechanical refrigeration, allowed the dairy to expand and make ice cream a larger part of the business.

Smith Dairy incorporated in 1930. During the 1930s, the company replaced its horse-drawn wagons with trucks for home delivery, and in 1938 the dairy purchased its first gas-electric hybrid delivery truck.

In 1947, Smith Dairy became a member of Quality Chekd, a dairy trade organization that uses third-party testing and audits to assure quality and food safety above governmental regulations.

Smith Dairy modernized its operations in the 1950s, when the first cooling tank for storing milk was installed; the company's first conveyor system brought automation to the plant.

The 1960s and 1970s were decades of advancement and growth for Smith Dairy, which became one of the first in the industry to make its own plastic jugs. The company purchased four dairies during this period, allowing it to expand its service into additional communities.

In the 1980s, the company began its third generation of family leadership. Smith Dairy purchased the Ruggles ice cream brand in 1988 from the original owners, Herb and Anne Ruggles, which led to the opening of a new ice cream plant in 1989. As part of the plant's grand opening celebration, Smith Dairy made and served the largest milkshake on record, earning a place in that year's edition of Guinness Book of World Records.

In 1992, the company moved into new offices and distribution center. The acquisition of Wayne Dairy in Richmond, Indiana, in 1994 would enable Smith Dairy to process milk with extended shelf life. This would lead to the 1998 introduction of Moovers, the nation's first UHT single-serve milk in plastic bottles.

Smith Dairy introduced its Yellow Super Jug for Smith's milk in 1999. Since natural and fluorescent light degrades the flavor and vitamin content of milk, Smith Dairy chose to use opaque yellow plastic packaging to protect its milk from harmful light oxidation.

As of 2009, Smith Dairy has more than 450 associates. It processes an average of 100,000 gallons of milk daily and sells over 4 million gallons of ice cream annually.

In July 2020, SmithFoods issued a nationwide recall of product it manufactured for ALDI.

== See also ==
- List of dairy product companies in the United States
