= Surfing Goat Dairy =

Dairy farm in Kula, Hawaii

Coordinates: 20.806560°N 156.364662°W

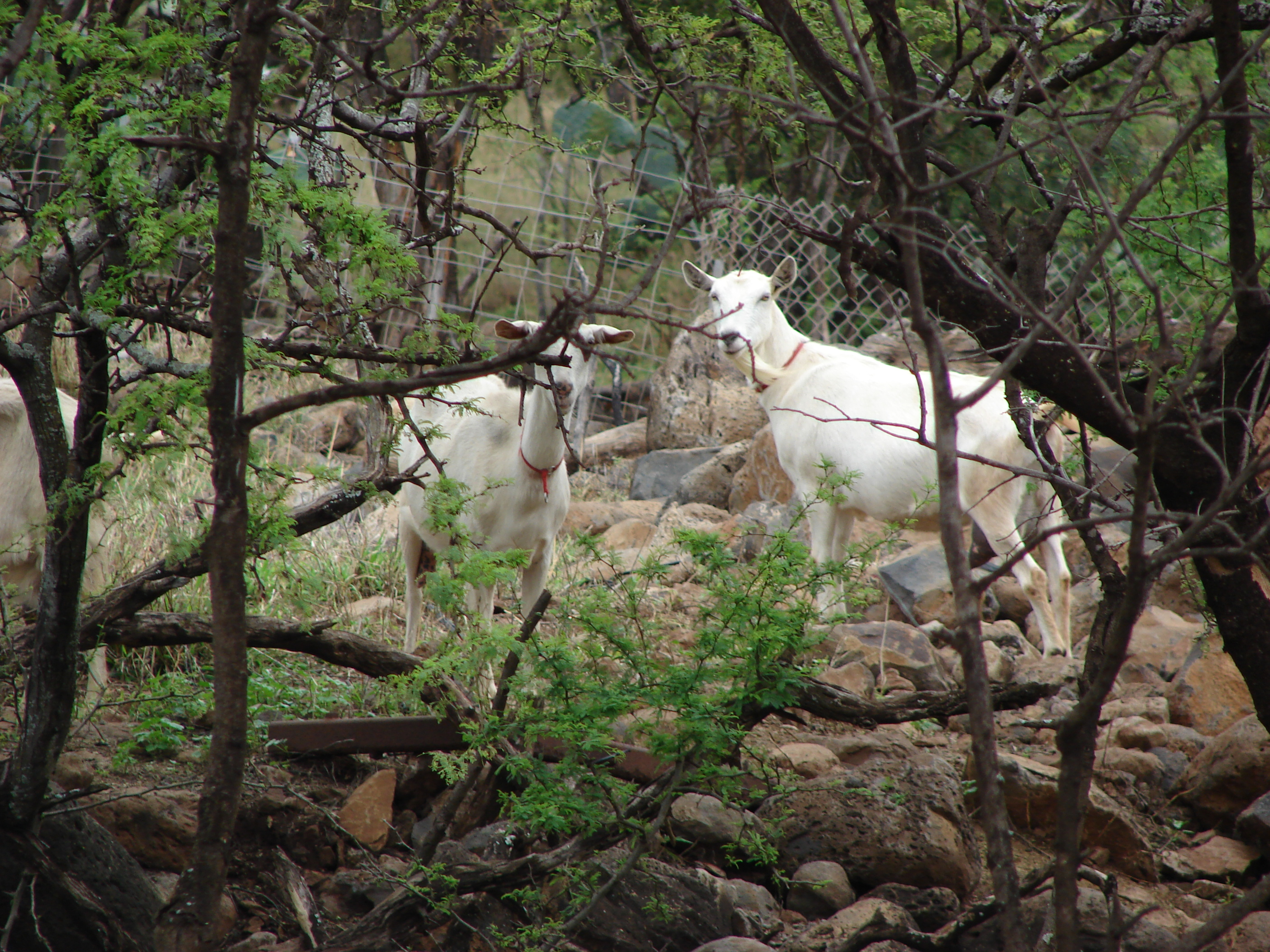
Goats from the Surfing Goat Dairy, Prosopis pallida is the shrub by them

Surfing Goat Dairy is a dairy farm in Kula, Hawaii on the island of Maui. It produces more than two dozen goat cheeses. Many of the cheeses have won national awards. Tours are offered. Surfing Goat was established in 1999 by Germans Thomas and Eva Kafsack. Today it is owned by a small group of Canadian Investors led by Managing Partner Jay Garnett. It is located on 42 acres and is one of seven goat dairies in Hawaii. It is located on the slopes of the Haleakalā crater.

== See also ==
- Omaopio
- List of dairy product companies in the United States
