= Penn State Berkey Creamery =

Producer and vendor of dairy products

Coordinates: 40.8041°N 77.8622°W

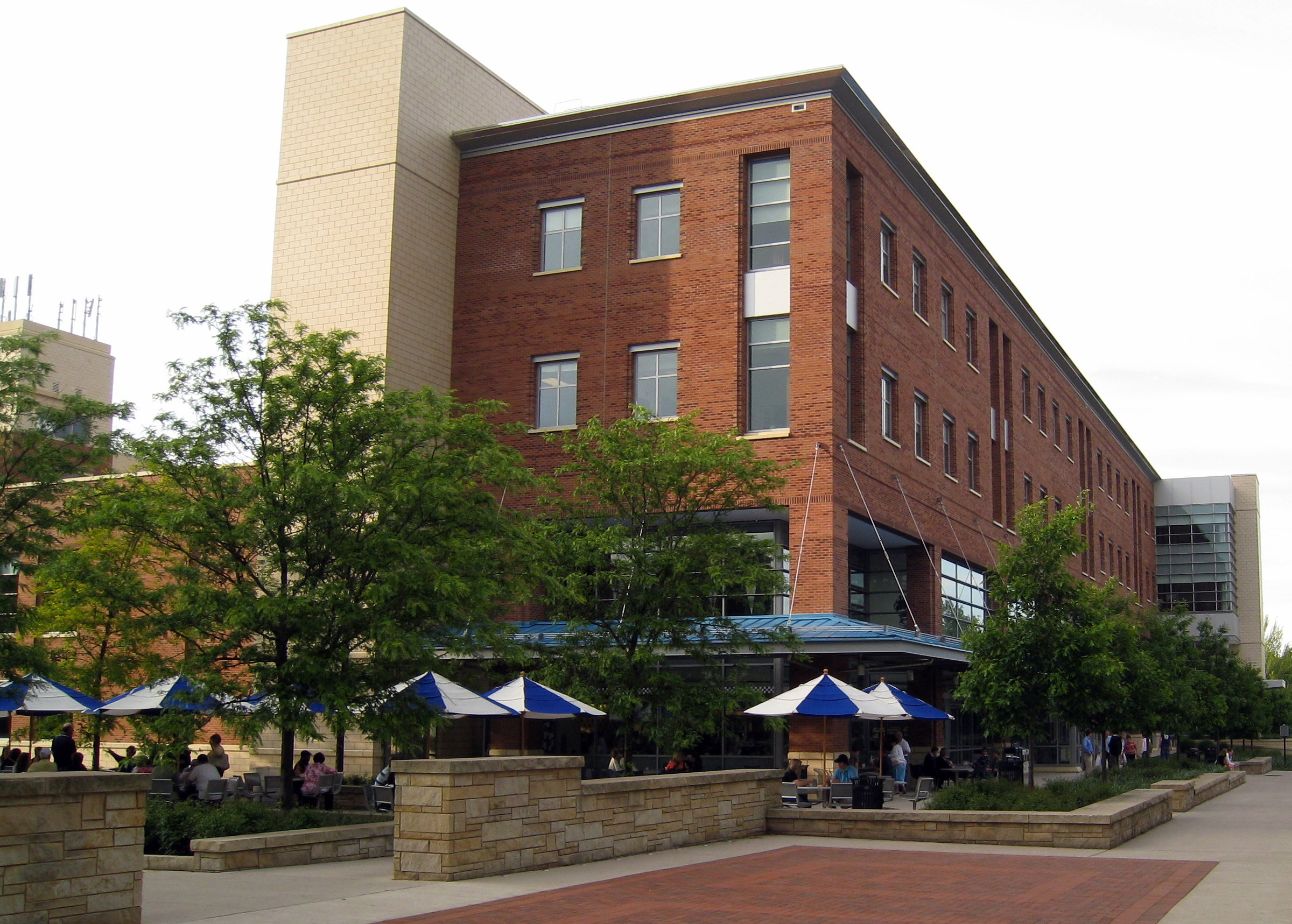
- Penn State Berkey Creamery in 2010.
- Type: Subsidiary
- Industry: Creamery
- Founded: 1865; 161 years ago in University Park, Pennsylvania
- Headquarters: Food Science Building, University Park, Pennsylvania
- Key people: Tom Davis (Berkey Creamery Manager)
- Products: Ice cream; Cheese; Milk; Butter
- Parent: Pennsylvania State University

The Penn State Berkey Creamery, also known as simply The Creamery, is a producer and vendor of ice cream, sherbet, and cheese, all made through the Department of Food Science in the College of Agricultural Sciences of the Pennsylvania State University. Founded in 1865, it is the largest university creamery in the United States, using approximately 5 million pounds of milk annually, approximately 70% of which comes from a 225-cow herd at the university's Dairy Production Research Center and the rest local milk suppliers, and selling 750,000 hand-dipped ice cream cones per year. Offering over 100 ice cream flavors made with a butterfat content of 14.1% and ingredients from around the country and the world, the Creamery's ice cream is enjoyed by many students and alumni every day.

== History ==
The first Creamery was built in 1865, and dairy short courses were first offered in 1892. Ice cream became a part of football weekend tradition in 1896, when Creamery ice cream was first sold to the public. By 1932, the Creamery was buying milk and cream from hundreds of nearby farmers and was selling ice cream in both State College and Altoona, Pennsylvania.

Ice cream makers Ben Cohen and Jerry Greenfield of Ben & Jerry's, are 1978 alumni of the Penn State Creamery correspondence course in ice cream-making, Agriculture 5150, which teaches manufacturers the basics of ice cream production.

During the 1980s the Creamery was using three million pounds of milk per year, and in 2004, it supplied the Penn State dining halls with over 225,000 gallons of milk. That same year, it produced 200,000 pounds of cheese products and 225,000 gallons of ice cream and sherbet, both selling these products and providing them for university use.

The creamery is known for prohibiting the mixing of ice cream flavors (i.e., having scoops of different flavors in one cone/cup). The rule is in place to prevent cross-contamination of possible allergens. According to Penn State lore, the only recorded instance where the rule was waived was when U.S. President Bill Clinton visited the creamery in 1996, and he was permitted to have the Cherry Quist and Peachy Paterno flavors mixed together. However, when Clinton returned after his presidency, creamery workers would no longer serve him mixed flavors.

The Creamery moved from its long-time home in Borland Laboratory location to a new location in the new Food Science Building at the intersection of Curtin Road and Bigler Road in 2006. The new Creamery is closer to Beaver Stadium, the East Residence Halls dormitory complex, and a parking deck. When the move was first announced, there were some student protests, but these protests eventually subsided. There are five Creamery ice cream flavors that have remained the most popular in recent Creamery history: Vanilla, Bittersweet Mint, Peanut Butter Swirl, Peachy Paterno, and Butter Pecan. The new creamery facility has been named the Berkey Creamery, in honor of the Berkey family who donated a large sum of money to the construction of the Food Sciences Building, which includes the new creamery facility.

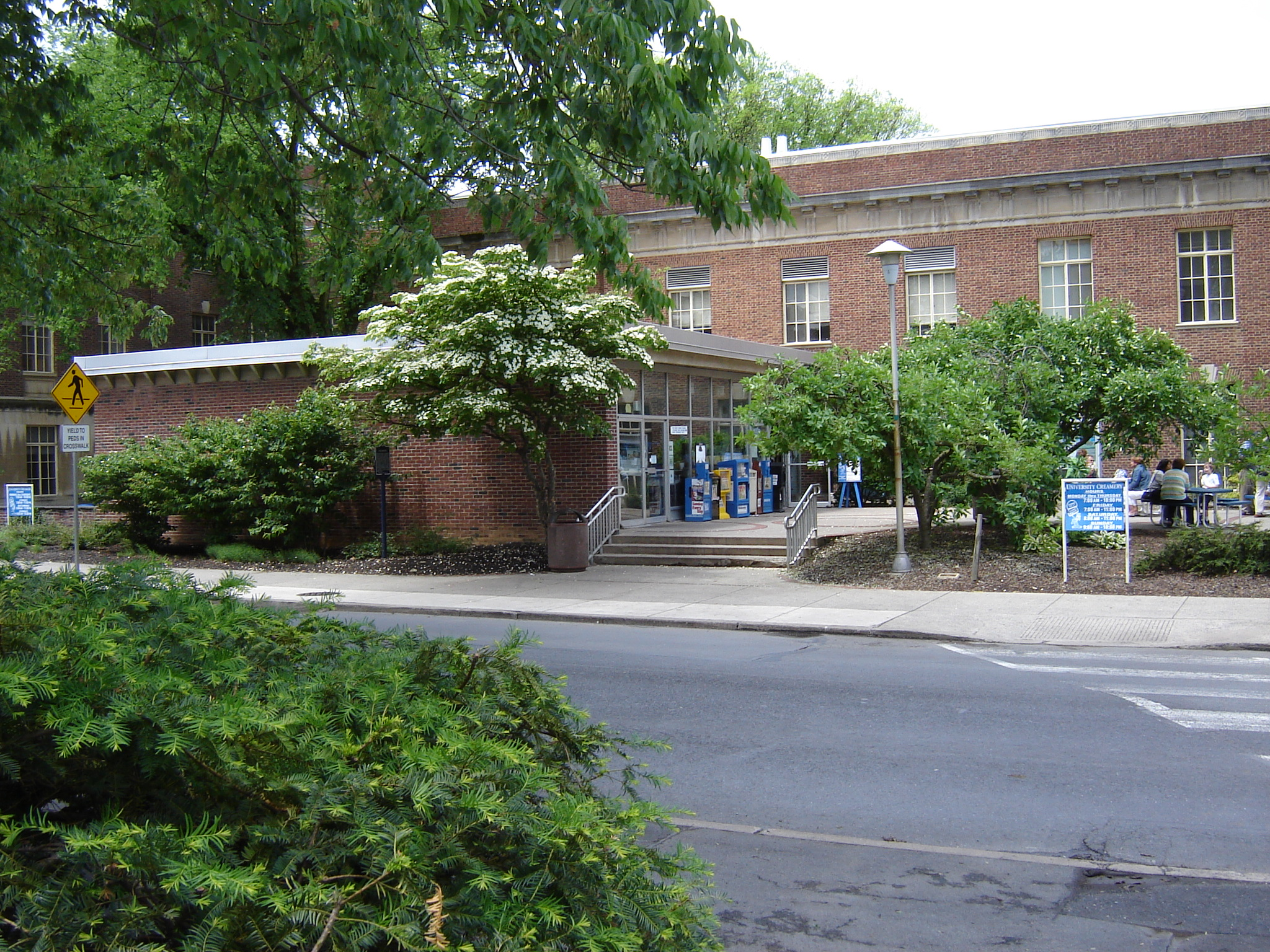
The old location of the Creamery was in Borland Laboratory.

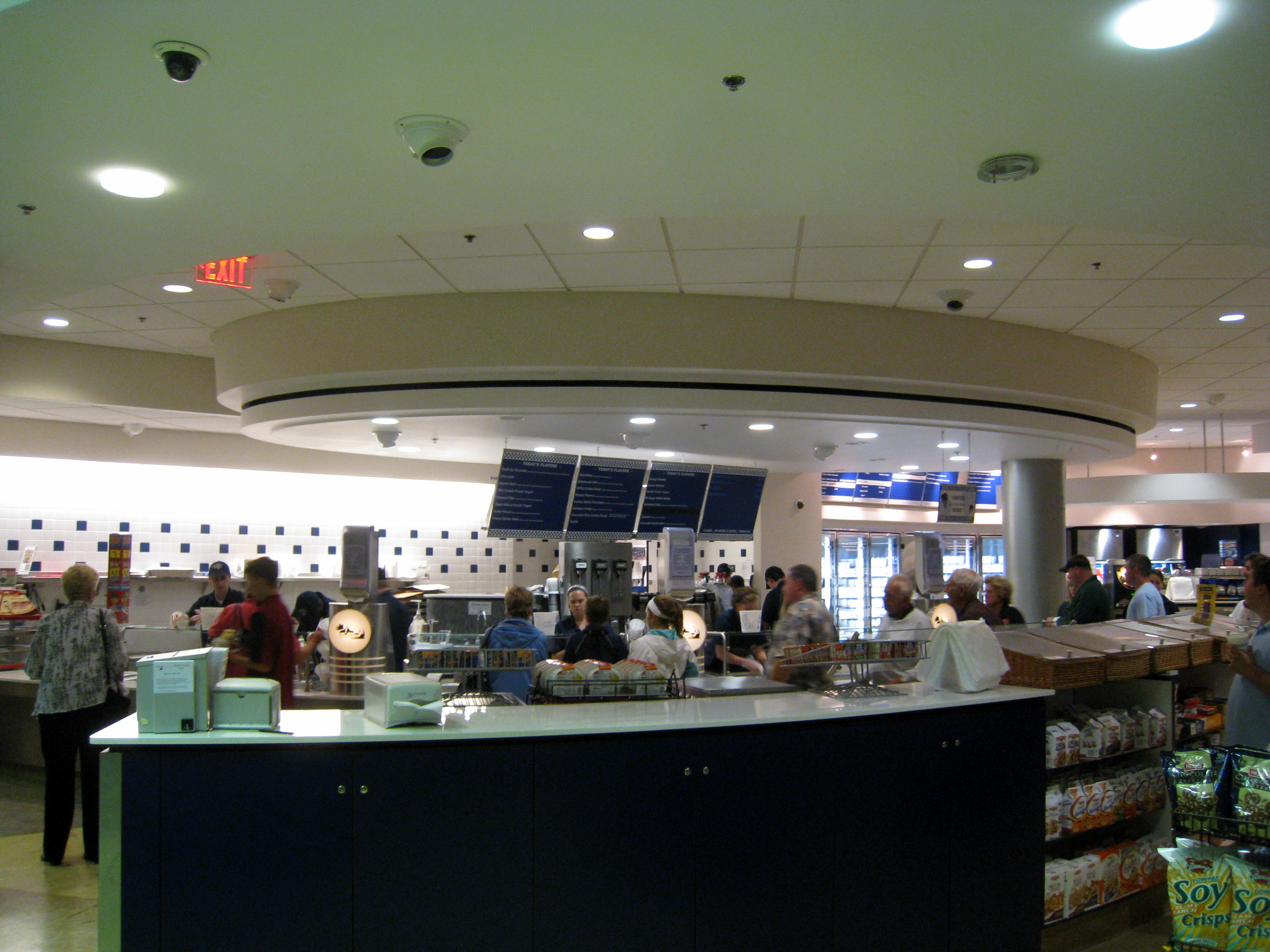
Patrons waiting in line to receive their orders.

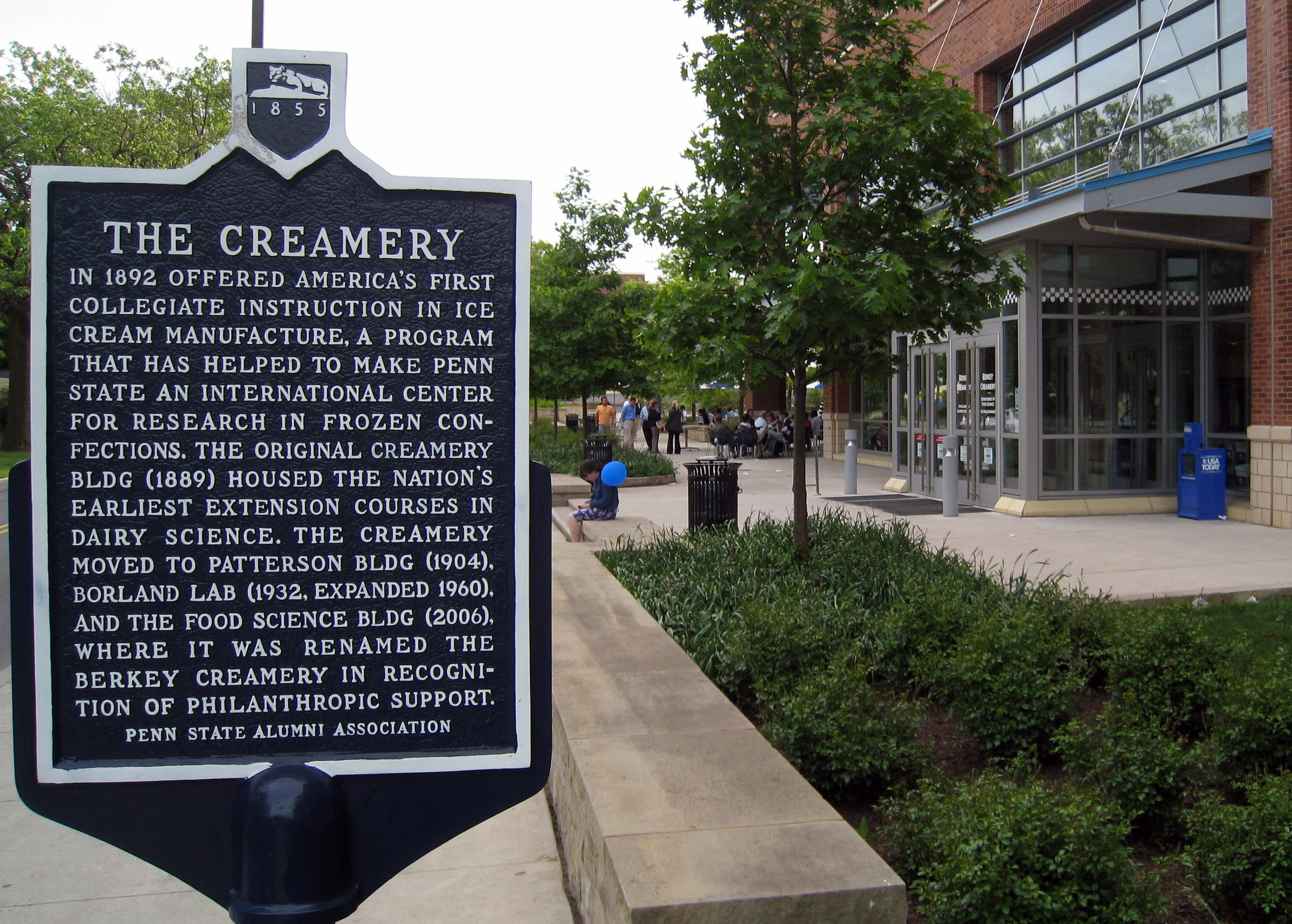
An information plaque for The Creamery erected by the Alumni Association.

== See also ==
- List of dairy product companies in the United States
