= Penn State College of Agricultural Sciences =

Agricultural college of Penn State University

- Type: Public
- Established: 1861; 165 years ago
- Parent institution: Pennsylvania State University
- Location: University Park, Pennsylvania, 16802, U.S.
- Academic Departments: Agricultural and Biological Engineering; Agricultural Economics, Sociology, and Education; Animal Science; Ecosystem Science and Management; Entomology; Food Science; Plant Pathology and Environmental Microbiology; Plant Science; Veterinary and Biomedical Sciences
- Facilities: The Arboretum at Penn State; Pasto Agricultural Museum; Penn State Creamery; Snider Ag Arena
- Website: agsci.psu.edu

The Penn State College of Agricultural Sciences offers 17 undergraduate majors, 23 minors, and graduate programs in 18 major areas. The college awarded the nation's first baccalaureate degrees in agriculture in 1861.

With 9 academic departments and 67 cooperative extension offices, one in each of Pennsylvania's counties, the college is widely recognized as one of the nation's top institutions for agricultural research and education programs.

== History ==
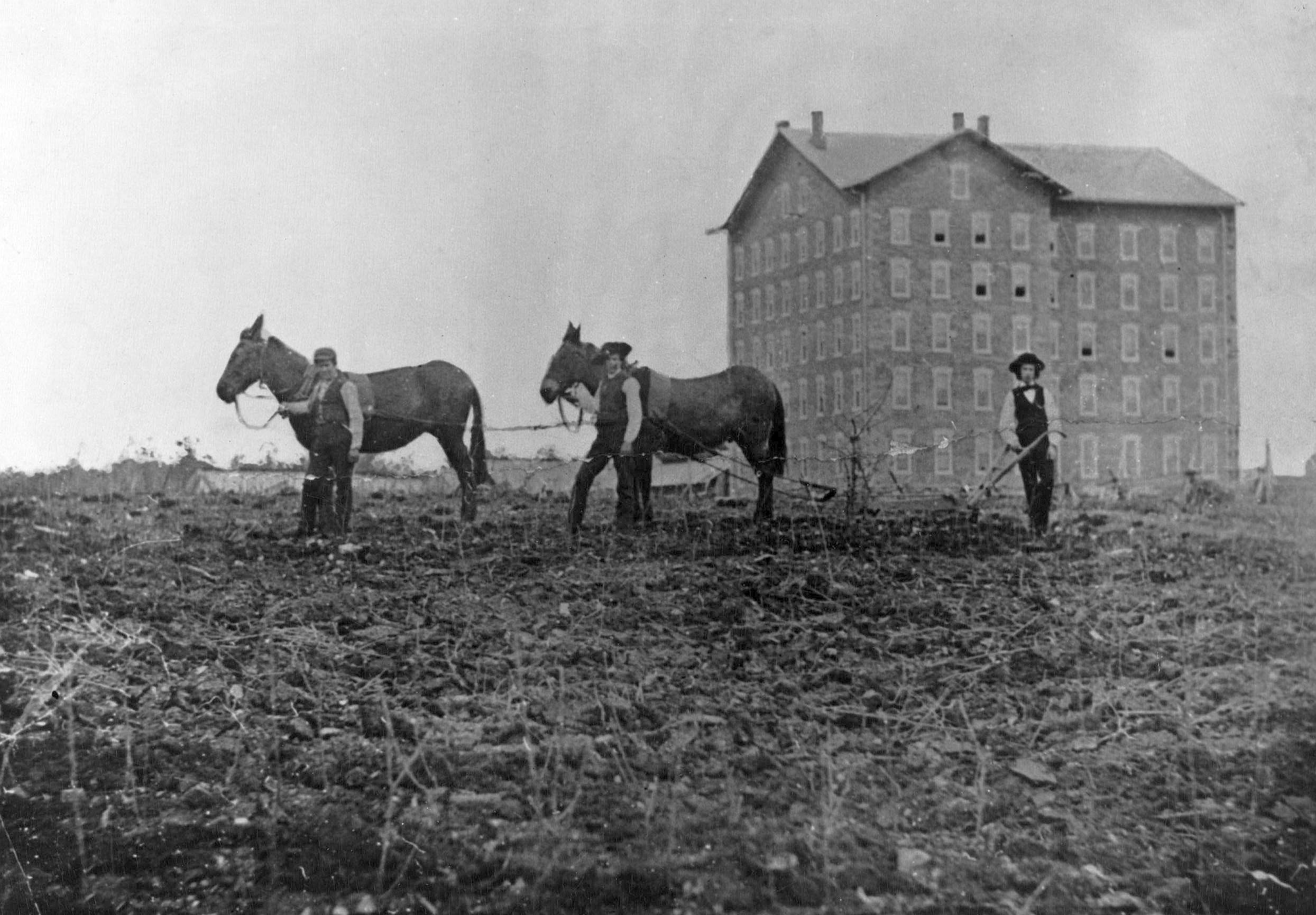
Farmer High School and also known as the Old Main

In 1855, before the Penn State College of Agricultural Sciences, it was a high school known as The Farmer's High School run by Evan Pugh. Pugh helped to transform the Farmer's High School into the Penn State College of Agricultural Sciences by supporting Congress to pass the Morrill Land-Grant Act. The only land-grant university in Pennsylvania, Penn State became one of the nation's very first when President Abraham Lincoln signed the Morrill Act into law in 1862. As a result, government receives money from the sales of land to help fund a college that would teach people better farming methods. In addition to learning farming methods, Pugh had contributed other subjects to the college including chemistry, geology, mathematics, and mineralogy. Not only did he contributed knowledge to the college but he also donated money towards the laboratory buildings and research. Pugh died on April 29, 1864. Today, he is known as the first President of The Pennsylvania State University and the highest award a professor can receive at the university is named after him which is called the "Evan Pugh Professors."

== Academics ==
Undergraduate students can choose from 17 majors, 24 minors, and three two-year associate degree programs. Graduate programs are offered in 18 major areas within the college, and faculty participate in 10 inter-college programs and seven dual-title degree options.

=== Academic departments ===
The college is organized into nine academic departments:

- Agricultural and Biological Engineering
- Agricultural Economics, Sociology, and Education
- Animal Science
- Ecosystem Science and Management
- Entomology
- Food Science
- Plant Pathology and Environmental Microbiology
- Plant Science
- Veterinary and Biomedical Sciences

== Extension Services ==
Penn State Extension Services is the "extension" of the College of Agricultural Sciences that serves the general public. Extension Services were officially organized in 1907, assigned the nation's first county agent to Bedford County in 1910, and had full-time extension agents in sixty-two of the sixty-seven Pennsylvania counties by 1921. Penn State Extension Services is currently organized into seven administrative units.

- 4-H Youth Development
- Agronomy and Natural Resources
- Animal Systems
- Energy, Business, and Community vitality
- Food, Families, and Health
- Food Safety and Quality
- Horticulture

== Research ==
The Penn State College of Agricultural Sciences invests nearly $97 million in research and graduate study yearly. Scientists in the college are seeking solutions to the agricultural and ecological problems of our time by conducting basic and applied research focusing on cross-cutting thematic areas.

=== Research and Extension Centers ===
Penn State operates four agricultural research and extension centers where scientists conduct applied research in real-world conditions and show the results of that research to farmers. The Fruit Research and Extension Center, located in Biglerville in Adams County in the tree fruit belt of south-central Pennsylvania, primarily focuses on apples and peaches, but also has cherries, plums, nectarines, and pears. The Southeast Agricultural Research and Extension Center, located in Landisville in Lancaster county in southeastern Pennsylvania, primarily focuses on agronomic crops, vegetables, small fruits, and flowers. The Lake Erie Regional Grape Research and Extension Center, located in Northeast in Erie County in the Lake Erie grape belt of northwestern Pennsylvania, primarily focuses on processing grapes, but also has some wine grapes.

==== Russell E. Larson Agricultural Research Center ====
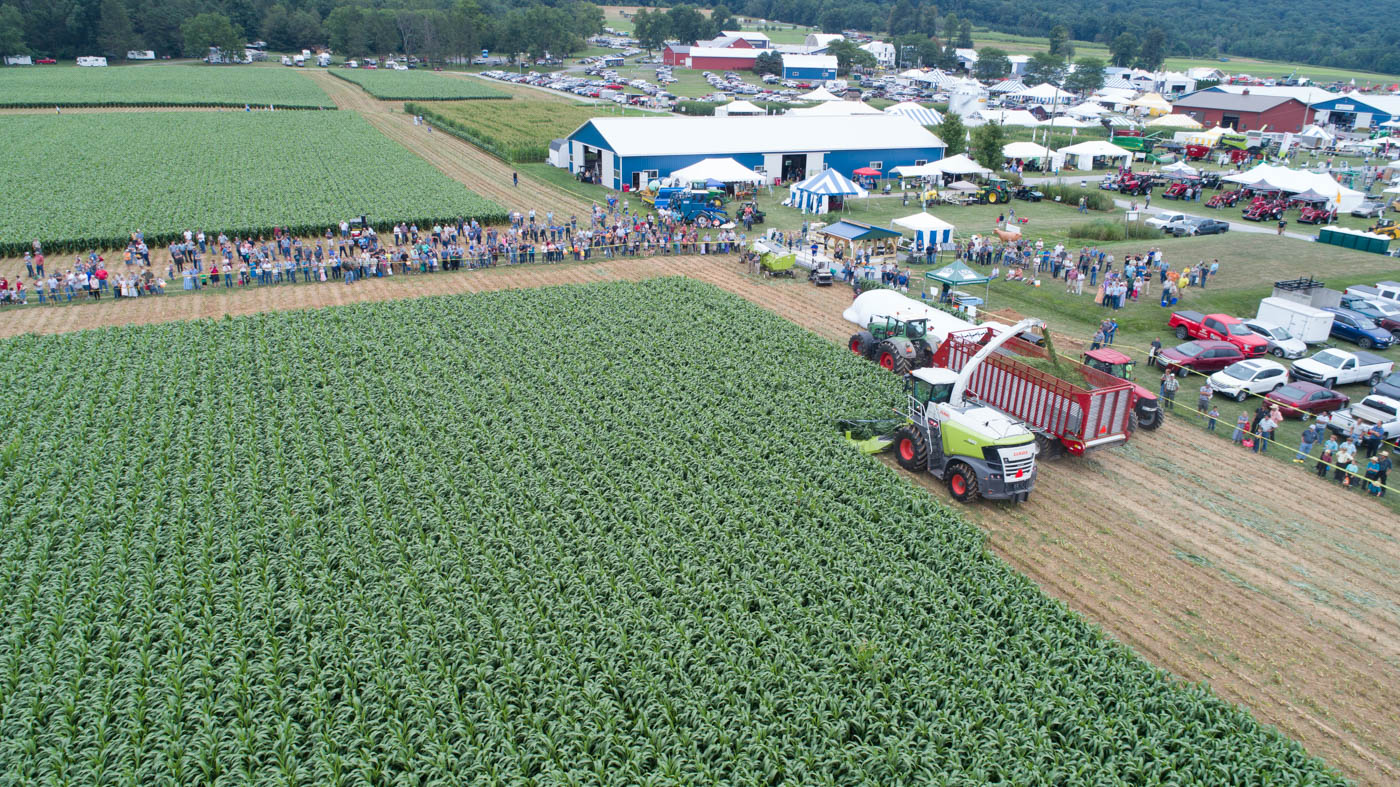
A farm machinery demonstration at Ag Progress Days

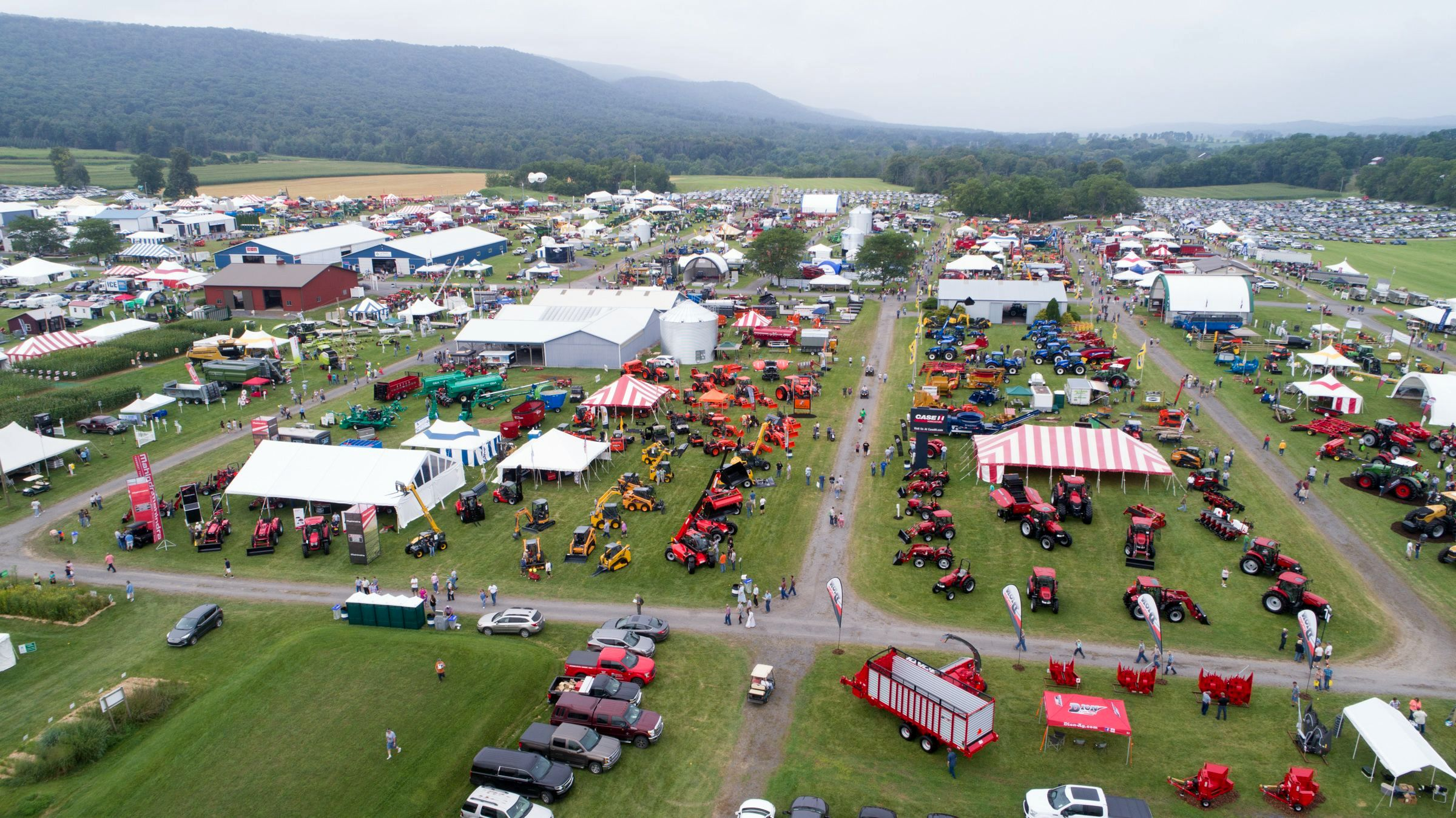
Aerial view of Penn State's Ag Progress Days in 2017, looking west

The Russell E. Larson Agricultural Research Center (40.706°N 77.961°W) at Rock Springs in Pennsylvania Furnace, Pennsylvania, a few miles southwest of State College in central Pennsylvania, is the primary location for field research performed by the college. It consists of the agronomy, entomology, horticulture, and plant pathology research farms, as well as being the location of Ag Progress Days and the Pennsylvania Department of Agriculture Livestock Evaluation Center.

It is the largest of Penn State's research centers at over 2,000 acres and supports the wide range of applied agricultural research that is conducted at the University Park campus. This is the location of Ag Progress Days, Pennsylvania’s largest outdoor agricultural exposition.

The Rock Springs Research Center traces its beginning to 1956 when Russel E. Larson, then the head of the horticultural department, began searching for suitable land for a horticultural research farm, as fields close to the University Park campus were being taken over by Penn State University Buildings. The first farm in the Spruce Creek valley was purchased in 1958, and eight additional farms were purchased up through 1998, bringing the total land area to over 2000 acres (> 800 ha).

There is a wide range research conducted at the agronomy, entomology, horticulture, and plant pathology research farms with dozens of faculty members involved in research projects.

Ag Progress Days, the largest outdoor agricultural exposition in Pennsylvania, is held every August at the Russell E. Larson Agricultural Research Center. Ag Progress Days was held at various locations around the state until 1976, when Rock Springs became the permanent site. Over 400 exhibitors and 40,000 people attend in a typical year. Activities include crop and farm machinery demonstrations, demonstrations on topics such as healthy lifestyle and cooking, ag safety and health, farm and business, animals and livestock, equine, agronomic crops and soils, and forest and wildlife, and tours that highlight current research activities at the center.

=== PlantVillage ===
PlantVillage was founded by David Hughes, professor at Penn state university.

==== PlantVillage Nuru ====
Nuru is an artificial intelligence/machine learning mobile app that automatically diagnoses Cassava diseases, fall armyworm in maize/corn, potato diseases, and wheat diseases. It is Swahili for 'light' to symbolize how the app can bring light to smallholder farmers in Africa who typically lack access to expert knowledge systems.

== Enrollment ==
- Approximate total college undergraduate enrollment: 3,000
- Approximate college undergraduate enrollment at University Park campus: 2,100
- Total college graduate student enrollment: 580

== Scholarships ==
- The college has one of Penn State's largest scholarship programs, awarding nearly $2 million to nearly 700 students annually.

== Contributions ==
- The Penn State College of Agricultural Sciences has made many contributions in recent history. One example includes Penn State's research in unraveling the mystery of Colony collapse disorder (CCD). CCD is when bees suddenly disappear and do not return to their hives. Bees are important in producing honey and also pollinating plants. The E.B. O'Keeffe Foundation donated $100,000 to Penn State for research in CCD.
- Penn State is also making contributions towards protecting water quality. Fresh water is a limited resource, and Penn State is doing research to improve and sustain our fresh water resources. Water could become scarce someday, becoming the next generation's new oil.
- There are countless other amounts of research and contributions that Penn State is making to the world.

== See also ==
- List of agricultural universities and colleges
- List of colleges and universities in Pennsylvania
