= Ferndale Dairies =

Ferndale Dairies was a dairy products business located at 11 West 42nd Street in Manhattan, in the U.S. state of New York. The firm was incorporated in December 1930. The company purchased its milk in Delaware County, New York.

== See also ==
- List of dairy product companies in the United States
