= Prairie Farms Dairy =

American Midwestern dairy cooperative

- Type: Agricultural cooperative
- Industry: Agriculture
- Founded: 1938; 88 years ago
- Founder: Richard E. Galvan
- Headquarters: 3744 Staunton Road, Edwardsville, Illinois, United States
- Area served: Midwest and Mid-South
- Key people: Matt McClelland (CEO)
- Products: Dairy
- Revenue: $4.69 billion+ (2025)
- Website: www.prairiefarms.com

Prairie Farms Dairy is a dairy cooperative founded in Carlinville, Illinois, and now headquartered in Edwardsville, Illinois. As a dairy cooperative, Prairie Farms receives milk from producers and converts it into many different products, including cheese, butter, ice cream, sour cream, cottage cheese, various dips, yogurt, and fluid milk. Prairie Farms also produces and sells juices, flavored drinks, and pre-made iced tea.

Originally, the company was named the Producers Creamery, but it was renamed Prairie Farms Dairy. Since its beginning in 1938, the company has expanded largely through mergers, acquisitions, and joint ventures with various dairy cooperatives, producers, and manufacturers.

== Current Information ==
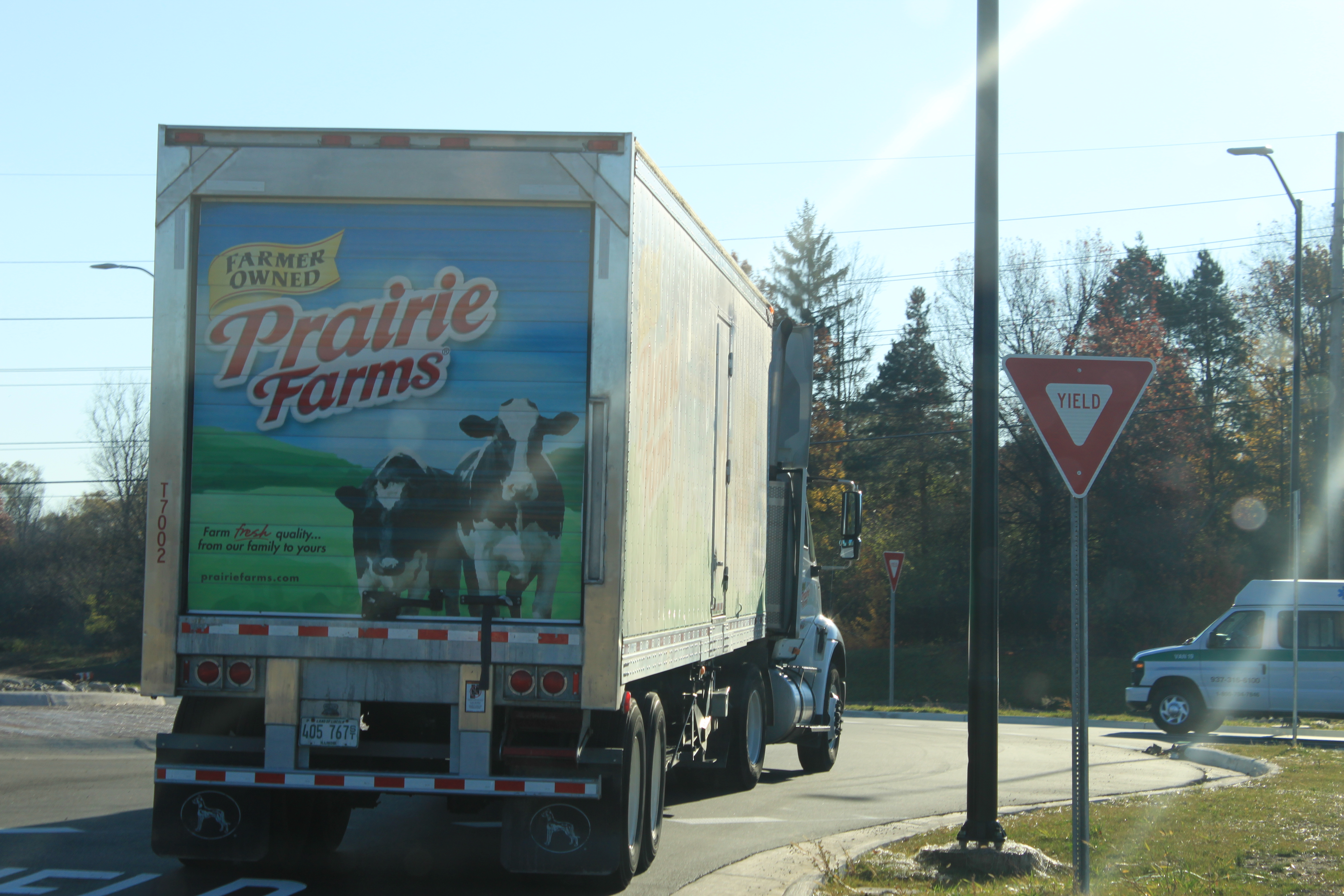
Prairie Farms delivery truck, Hamburg Township, Michigan

As of May 2018, Prairie Farms receives milk from over 500 producers, has 7,000 employees (683 in Greater St. Louis), operates 48 manufacturing plants and over 100 distribution facilities, and has annual sales of over $4.69 billion. The Prairie Farms distribution footprint covers over 30 percent of the United States; products are available in grocery chains, mass merchandiser stores, club stores, convenience stores, dollar stores, drug stores, schools, food service outlets, and warehouse distribution centers.

In 2008, the company reported that its producers produced 1,387,347,510 pounds of milk, averaging 1,873,000 pounds per farm. The sales from the 2007-2008 financial year were about $2.9 billion, a large improvement from the $33,000 sold in the company's opening year.

At its beginning, Prairie Farms distributed locally in Indiana, but it currently distributes its products to seventeen states, most of which are located in the Midwest. These states are Michigan, Kansas, Wisconsin, Nebraska, Oklahoma, Tennessee, Iowa, Illinois, Kentucky, Arkansas, North Carolina, Ohio, Missouri, Indiana, South Dakota, North Dakota, Minnesota and Mississippi.

== Economic impact ==
In 1999, Prairie Farms stated that they employed 2,100 people in eight Midwest states, and a total of 4,300 if they included those employed at joint venture plants.

== Products ==
In 1938, Prairie Farms' income came solely from the sale of butter. Today, Prairie Farms manufactures and sells dozens of different products, including milk, cheese, ice cream, juices, sour cream, dips, and many others. The company also manufactures fat-free and low-fat versions of almost every product, as well as lactose-free dairy products.

Prairie Farms also makes several novelty products During the winter months, candy cane and eggnog-flavored milk are available. The Ice Cream Specialties Division manufactures several types of ice cream novelties under the North Star brand.

Ice cream makes up a significant portion of Prairie Farms' sales. The company offers multiple variations, ranging from fat-free to premium to sherbet, in an array of 65 different flavors.

== Brands ==
Prairie Farms produces a wide range of products and sells them through multiple branded partners. These brands are:

- Southern Belle Dairy Company, LLC
- Luvel Dairy Products, Inc.
- Ice Cream Specialties, Inc.
- Turner Dairy Holdings, LLC
- Hiland Dairy Galvan Foods Company
- Roberts Dairy Company
- Hiland-Roberts Ice Cream Company
- Muller-Pinehurst Dairy, Inc.
- Madison Farms Butter Company
- Coleman Dairy
- Central Dairy

== History ==
During the Great Depression, dairy cooperatives were scarce. Starting a cooperative required large amounts of money, and the only way to obtain it was to sell shares of stock. However, because the market was so fragile, going public was generally not beneficial, especially when the price of a share of stock was far greater than the price of the product sold by the company. In the 1930s, the average container of butter sold for approximately ten cents, while a share of stock in Prairie Farms would have cost nearly twenty-five dollars.

When the Depression ended, cooperatives began to form because farmers sought solutions to common problems. Due to milk's short shelf life, it needed to be sold quickly or converted to other products which did not spoil as quickly. However, the facilities needed to do this were expensive, and most farmers did not possess the resources needed to install them on their farms. Through the use of cooperatives, raw milk was purchased from the farmers and converted to butter and cheese, then distributed and sold to consumers. In 1938, the Producers Creamery of Carlinville, which would later be renamed Prairie Farms Dairy, was the ninth cooperative creamery to join the Illinois Producers Creameries.

== Growth ==
The Producers Creamery of Carlinville of 1938 differed greatly from the current Prairie Farms. Over the past 70 years, the dairy cooperative has grown largely by merging with and buying other dairies. The first such merger occurred on January 1, 1954, when the company bought the Community Dairy of Alton, Illinois. This acquisition benefited the Producers Creamery of Carlinville greatly in many ways. The Community Dairy of Alton received four million pounds of milk per year from forty producers and had annual sales of approximately $250,000. The Producers Creamery of Carlinville continued to use the Community Dairy name on all glass-bottled products produced by the facilities in Alton.

March 1, 1962 marked a major change for the Producers Creamery of Carlinville. After merging with Prairie Farms of Western Illinois, the Prairie Farms Dairy of Carbondale, Illinois, and the Producers Dairy of Danville, Prairie Farms Dairy Incorporated was formed. The new company distributed products throughout the middle of the country and was more financially secure than the three companies were individually. The merger was initially named Prairie Farms Creamery of Carlinville but later it was renamed Prairie Farms Dairy.

In April 1969, Prairie Farms created the PFD Supply Company, a company designed to produce nondairy products for fast food restaurants. This decision was profitable for Prairie Farms, bringing in three million dollars annually by 1978. PFD Supply manufactured and distributed almost all of the food and paper products used by McDonald's, Wendy's, Burger King, Dairy Queen, and many others.

Another notable acquisition consisted of the purchase of the Chamberlain Ice Cream Company located in Lafayette, Indiana, and the Vix Ice Cream Company with locations in St. Louis, Missouri, and Marietta, Georgia. On August 1, 1969, Prairie Farms created Ice Cream Specialties, Inc. in conjunction with the purchase of the two companies. Ice Cream Specialties mainly produced ice cream novelties, or small, individually packaged ice cream treats, which Prairie Farms thought would bring in sizable revenue during the summer months. The purchase cost Prairie Farms about $2 million, and the company predicted ice cream novelty sales would pay for it within ten years. However, Kroger opened an ice cream novelty plant soon after in Indianapolis, reducing sales by 30 percent.

By 1979, the company was the result of 36 dairy purchases, nine mergers, and two joint ventures, and those listed previously are only a few of the many that occurred. The businesses purchased by the cooperative varied greatly, from distributors to ice cream producers. Prairie Farms acquired dairies with sales ranging from $250,000 a year to $7,000,000 a year, and the reason for the purchase ranged from the acquisition of a competitor's customer base to gaining new facilities with modern technology. The total amount paid for the mergers and acquisitions up until 1982 was more than $10 million.

== Since 2008 and headquarters relocation ==
In recent years, consumers have been largely concerned with the presence of rbST and rBGH, which are bovine growth hormones used to allow a cow to produce more milk. Although the Food and Drug Administration has repeatedly stated that dairy products from cows given these hormones are safe for human consumption, many people remain unconvinced. Beginning February 1, 2008, Prairie Farms decided to prohibit its producers from using rbST and rBGH due to increasing requests from consumers.

In early 2010, Walmart, a major Prairie Farms customer, decreased the amount of product purchased from Prairie Farms. Previously, Walmart had used Prairie Farms as the milk source for its house brand, Great Value. Currently, Walmart buys the milk for the Great Value brand from a dairy in Texas. Although this shift decreased the volume of milk sold by Prairie Farms, CEO Ed Mullins says that Walmart is still the company's largest customer. In an article from the Illinois Times, Mullins stated that layoffs and plant closures are a possible result of the loss in sales, but that the company is trying to make up for the loss by increasing sales to other companies.

In 2016, Prairie Farms announced plans to relocate the corporate headquarters from Carlinville, 35 miles south to Edwardsville, a rapidly growing St. Louis suburb, to assist with talent attraction and retention, as well as consolidate corporate employees from five locations. Prairie Farms moved into the new $9 million, 30,000 square foot headquarters building in early August 2017. The building is located at 3744 Staunton Road in far eastern Edwardsville, within Edwardsville Corporate Center, a business park in the southeast quadrant of the interchange of Interstate 55 and Illinois Route 143; the business park also houses the headquarters of Scott Credit Union and Hortica Insurance. Initially, an estimated 80 to 100 employees will be based in the building.

In May 2020, Prairie Farms acquired six plants as part of the Chapter 11 Bankruptcy of Dean Foods.

== See also ==
- List of dairy product companies in the United States
