= Gustafson's Farm =

Gustafson's Farm is a brand name of milk and dairy products sold in the U.S. state of Florida. The main Gustafson Dairy Farm is located in Green Cove Springs, Florida, and was one of the largest privately owned dairy farms in the Southeast United States. Started in 1908, the main farm occupies nearly 10,000 acres (40 km^{2}) in Green Cove Springs. Their first cow on their farm was named "Buttercup".

The Gustafson brand is now owned by Southeast Milk Inc., a dairy cooperative based in Belleview, Florida. The production plant in Green Cove Springs, Florida, closed in October 2013, but Gustafson-labeled products are still produced at the Southeast Milk Inc. facility and distributed in Florida. All Gustafson products feature a black-and-white portrait of husband-and-wife founders Frank and Agnes Gustafson (also known as "Mama and Papa Gus") prominently featured on its packaging. The portrait was shot by Jacksonville Beach photographer Virgil Deane. A subject file on the dairy and transcriptions of Gustafson family letters from the 1930s are housed in the Historical Archives of the Clay County Clerk of the Court and Comptroller.

== See also ==
- List of dairy product companies in the United States
