= Cooksville Cheese Factory =

- U.S. National Register of Historic Places
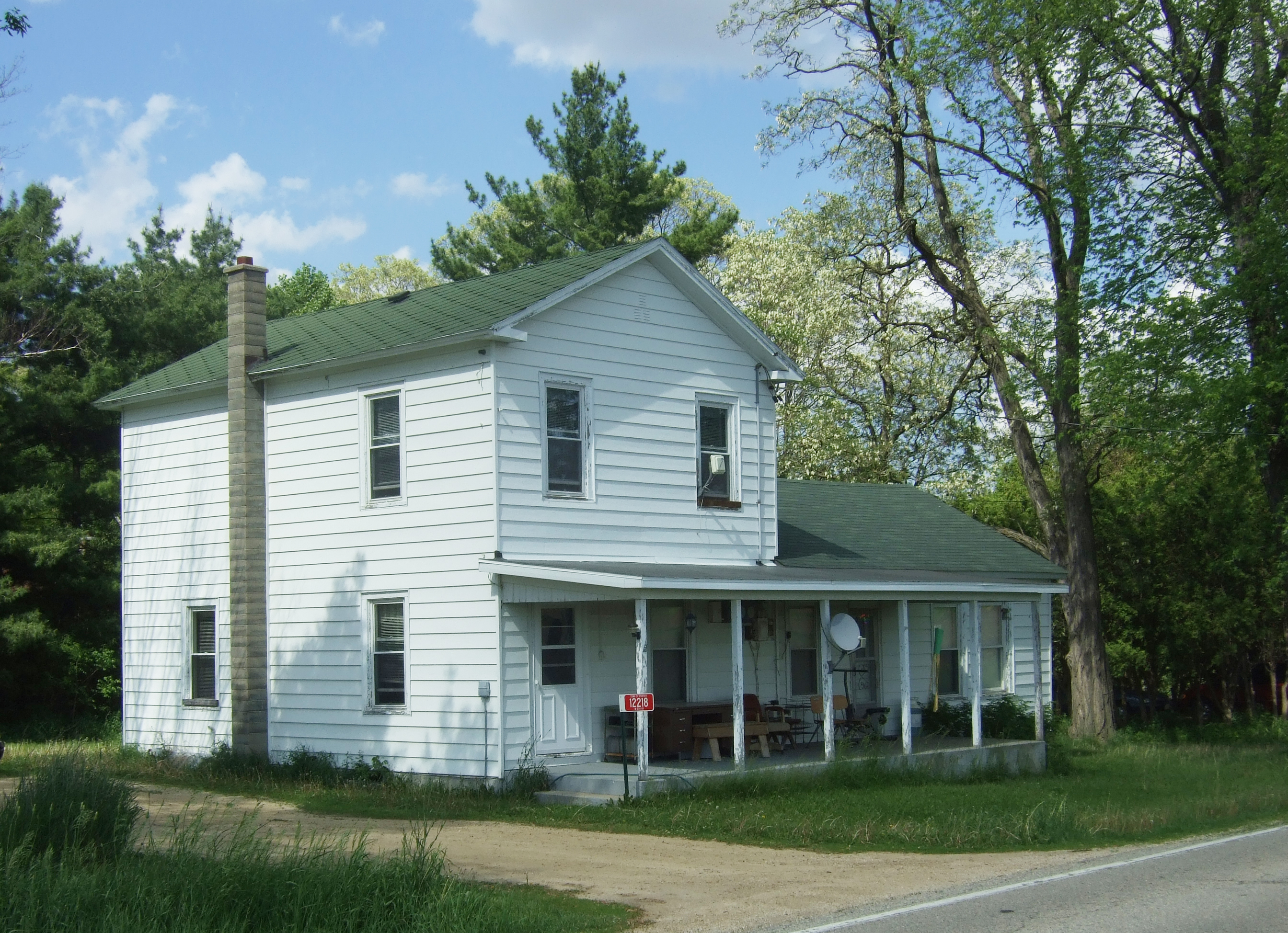
- Cooksville Cheese Factory
- Location: Evansville, Wisconsin
- Coordinates: 42.83487°N 89.24328°W
- Built: 1875
- NRHP reference No.: 80000395
- Added to NRHP: September 17, 1980

The Cooksville Cheese Factory in Evansville is a remnant of Wisconsin's early dairy industry. It was added to the National Register of Historic Places in 1980.

In 1875 Benjamin Hoxie started a business in Cooksville to buy milk from local farmers and make cheese. The enterprise was an agricultural cooperative, with the patrons (farmers) sharing ownership and Hoxie the proprietor of the factory. It could process the milk of 600 cows. The business did not last many years, selling the cheese-making equipment in 1884.

The factory is a simple 2-story frame building on a limestone basement, with a one-story wing to the side. The design is simple and utilitarian, other than short cornice returns.

In addition to making cheese, the building was a social hub, a place where farmers met, and possibly the Good Templars. By 1894 it was used as housing.
