= Winter Park Dairy =

Winter Park Dairy is a creamery and cheese producer in Florida. It is one of the first to be established in the state and has been involved in reworking the laws governing milk products in the state. It sells its products wholesale. Winter Park Dairy's Belu Sunshine is Florida's first aged raw milk cheese. The business is owned by David Green and his wife, Dawn Taylor-Green and started out focusing on local points of sale including the Saturday Winter Park Farmers Market, Harmoni Market in College Park, Florida and restaurants including the J.W. Marriott Orlando (Grande Lakes) and Hue (restaurant), as well as mail order through its website.
