= Shamrock Farms =

Dairy company in Arizona, United States

- Type: Dairy
- Founded: 1922; 104 years ago
- Founder: W.T. McClelland; Winifred McClelland; Norman McClelland
- Headquarters: 2228 N Black Cyn Hwy, Phoenix, AZ 85009
- Number of locations: 15
- Area served: United States
- Key people: Kent McClelland (CEO)
- Products: Milk; Protein shakes; Sour cream; Cottage cheese; Creams; Seasonal items like eggnog
- Owner: McClelland Family
- Number of employees: ▲6,000 (2025)
- Website: www.shamrockfarms.net

Shamrock Farms is a dairy company in Phoenix, Arizona, United States. Its mascot is a cow named "Roxie."

Founded in 1922, Shamrock Farms is owned by the McClelland Family and is the largest family-owned and operated dairy in the Southwest. It produces and distributes a full line of dairy products.

== History ==
Shamrock Farms was founded in 1922 in Arizona by Irish immigrant W.T. McCleland (1892-1968). He and his wife would deliver milk on a Ford Model T truck. In 1933, Shamrock Farms started utilizing milking machines. In 1951, it acquired its first refrigerated truck. By 1967, it became the biggest dairy company in Arizona.

== Mmmmilk brand ==
Mmmmilk is a well known milk brand distributed by Shamrock Farms in the Southwestern United States. The milk brand is produced in Arizona. Shamrock Farms sponsors the Arizona Diamondbacks, and some of their bottles have featured Diamondback players such as Mark Grace and Luis Gonzalez. Shamrock Foods also provides commercial foodservice.

Shamrock Mmmmilks are made in the following flavors:

Mmmmilk

- Whole White
- 2% Reduced Fat White
- 1% Low Fat White
- Fat Free Plus Calcium White
- Vanilla (2%)
- Chocolate (2%, Whole)
- Strawberry (2%)
- No Sugar Added 1% Chocolate
- Orange Cream
- Pickle Milk

Cold Brew Coffee and Milk:

- Original
- Vanilla
- Mocha

== See also ==
- List of dairy product companies in the United States
