= Smiling Hill Farm =

Coordinates: 43.647097°N 70.378828°W

- Type: Private
- Industry: Agriculture, Food Processing
- Founded: 1720
- Headquarters: Westbrook, Maine, USA
- Key people: Warren R. Knight - President
- Products: Milk, Ice Cream, Cheese
- Number of employees: 17
- Website: www.smilinghill.com

Smiling Hill Farm is a 500 acre traditional New England farm encompassing parts of the municipalities of Westbrook, Scarborough, and Gorham, Maine. Founded in 1720 as the homestead of Nathaniel Knight, the 12th-generation descendants continue to operate the farm today. Known as the "Knight Farm", the farm was renamed "Smiling Hill Farm" by Roger D. Knight in 1974. Roger named the farm after a favorite childhood book, "Smiling Hill Farm" by Miriam E. Mason (1937). Smiling Hill Farm is known for its characteristic smiling cow logo. According to Family Business magazine, Smiling Hill Farm is the 9th oldest continually operating family business in the United States.

== History ==
Smiling Hill Farm was founded in the 1720s as the home of the Knight family. The Knights had been in Scarborough since the mid-1600s starting with George Knight d.1671. Following George's early death, his widow left the family's land holdings in the Dunstan region of Scarborough for the relative safety of Portsmouth, NH, with her two young children, Mary and Nathan. Nathan Knight married Mary Westbrook and returned to Scarborough in the late 1600s with his brother-in-law, Col. Thomas Westbrook. Col. Thomas Westbrook's gravesite is located on the Scarborough portion of the property. Col. Westbrook was the uncle of Nathaniel Knight who was the first Knight to occupy the area now known as Smiling Hill Farm.

== Today ==
The farm continues raising dairy cattle, producing milk, and processing milk, ice cream, cheeses, and yogurt at the farm's micro-dairy. The farm bottles milk in reusable glass milk bottles. Smiling Hill Farm houses Silvery Moon Creamery, an artisanal cheese manufacturer. Smiling Hill Farm once packaged milk for Maine's Own Organic Milk Company. Smiling Hill Farm also bottles milk in glass bottles for other small local farms in Maine and New Hampshire. A farm animal exhibit, known as the "Barnyard", has been a popular feature of this farm. Hillside Lumber, Inc., the Knight family sawmill and building materials supply company, is co-located at the farm.

The Maine Turnpike Authority has had plans for a connector to connect Interstate 95 with Gorham since as far back as the 80's, but only officially announced them in early 2024. Part of the connector is planned to pass through property currently owned by Smiling Hill Farm. Along with general criticism from the public, the Knights have expressed disapproval of the plan previously, however, the Maine Turnpike Authority says it sees all of the land owners cooperating.
