= Rockview Farms =

Farming operation in Downey, California, United States

- Town/City: Downey
- State: California
- Country: United States
- Established: 1927
- Owner: Peter DeGroot
- Produces: Dairy

Rockview Farms was established in Downey, California, in 1927 by Bob Hops. In 1930, Mr. Joseph J. McCandless organized the dairy. In 1938, Rockview Farms won a gold medal in the raw milk exhibit at the Los Angeles County Fair. The McCandless brothers were selling retail with the help of Joseph McCandless' wife from Ireland.

A fire in 1957 destroyed a 900-foot barn at the dairy's address at 7011 Stewart and Gray Road and burned between 900 and 1000 tons of hay. Several corrals burned and total damages were estimated at $50,000. A dairy spokesman was quoted as saying the fire was "believed to have been accidentally started by children playing with matches or youths smoking and unauthorized to be on the premises."

In 1959, Rockview had 250 employees and 4 drive-in dairy stores with 2 in Downey offering a complete line of dairy products. In a publication about the city, a page on Rockview was written saying, "Rockview's low prices save housewives many dollars per year" and "Mr. J. McCandless, who has high regard for America's youth has provided guided tours of Rockview's facilities. Each year, over 15,000 school children and Scout groups enjoy these trips." Rockview Farms' cattle won 175 gold medals at State and County Fairs from 1930 to 1959.

Peter DeGroot, who originally supplied Rockview Farms with milk, bought the dairy in 1965 when the McCandless Brothers declared bankruptcy, and expanded the operation to 6 drive-in stores, 70 home delivery routes, and 8 wholesale routes.

== Processing Plant ==
The processing plant is located in Downey with a cold storage facility in the neighboring city of South Gate. The dairy has hired six to 10 new employees annually from targeted Enterprise Zone employment areas within the local community, earning the business tax credits now worth approximately $100,000 a year. The company uses the Q5i Near Infrared In-Line Analyzer from Engineering Solutions Experts, Inc., improving quality control during the fluid milk standardization process. Rockview Farms uses HTST pasteurization to ensure maximum nutrition and taste. Rockview Farms processes about 800,000 to one million gallons of milk a week. Expenses facing the company include the theft of plastic milk crates. Rockview Farms wrote in support of California Assembly Bill 1583 saying that it purchases nearly 450,000 milk crates annually at a cost of more than $1.7 million, yet police reports and investigations have found that milk crates and plastic pallets are stolen and sold illegally to junk dealers/recyclers who then grind the plastic containers into chips to be resold for a lesser price.

== Products ==
Rockview Farms purveys a full line of dairy and related products in a variety of sizes for the food service industry and retail trade including whole milk, organic milk, butter, buttermilk, cottage cheese, cream, half & half, sour cream, juice and yogurt. In January 2014, Rockview Farms switched organic milk label from the Good Heart label to Rockview Farms Organic Milk with Chief Operating Officer Ted Degroot citing, "greater consumer and industry awareness about our brand."

== Farms ==
Rockview Farms keeps its own dairy cows in Chino, northern California, and Nevada and processes its own milk and is delivered to the customer in 48 hours after milking. A complaint in 2008 alleging "violations of organic livestock management rules" was closed without decision by the USDA saying the action was "moot" stating Rockview Farms complied with the procedural terms and entered into an inspection agreement.

== Distribution ==
Weekly volume in 2001 totaled over 500,000 gallons of fluid milk weekly. Independent contractors supplement a company fleet of 75 refrigerated trailers and 40 refrigerated straight trucks. The trailer fleet served large chain accounts and distributors in outlying areas such as Riverside and San Diego. The straight truck fleet served wholesale customers in the Los Angeles Metro area. Wholesale routes ran seven days a week and typically carried 20 stops.

Rockview Farms supplied 25 drive-through dairies and 20 home delivery routes in 2003. Jim Pastor had a contract with Rockview Farms that serviced 4,800 homes using 14 milkmen. He picked up 300 new residential customers in June 2010 from word-of-mouth marketing. In 2004, Ted DeGroot, COO, was quoted in the Los Angeles Times over the price hike of whole milk to $2.90 per gallon, a 50% increase over 2003. "I am concerned with consumer response to this large an increase. It could hurt milk consumption."

Utah-based Winder Farms shared Rockview Farms origins of delivering milk directly to customer's doorsteps and acquired Jim Pastor's home delivery routes of Rockview Farms' products for an undisclosed price.

On Jan. 20, 2014, the company handed out chocolate milk cartons to students at Jeffrey Trail Middle School in Irvine, California, to celebrate National Milk Day and point to studies showing the post-recovery benefits of chocolate milk.
