= Cypress Point Creamery =

American cheese producer

- Website: www.cypresspointcreamery.com

Cypress Point Creamery is a cheese producer in Hawthorne, Florida. It is owned by John and Nancy Mims who maintain a herd of 170 Jersey cows as well as some Brown Swiss cows. The operation is located 15 miles (24 kilometers) east of Gainesville and sells Gouda, Havarti, baby Swiss, and tomme cheeses in addition to milk. The creamery is the state of Florida's fourth cheesemaking business that produces its cheeses on the same farm that produces the milk used in their creation, according to Scott Wallin of the Florida Dairy Farmers.
