= DCI Cheese Company =

American food company

DCI Cheese Company is a United States food industry company specializing in cheese, headquartered in Richfield, Wisconsin (in Mayville, Wisconsin before 2005). Established in 1975 as Dan Carter, Inc., a consulting firm for cheesemakers, it rapidly grew into a cheese manufacturer and marketer and changed its name to DCI Cheese Company in 2003.

Acquired by the Fairmount Food Group in 2005, DCI continues to operate as one of the leading specialty cheese companies in the United States. As of 2007 the company is a $500 million business with over 20 unique, company-owned cheese brands. In 2011, Saputo Inc., a Montreal-based cheese manufacturer with several Wisconsin plants, acquired DCI Cheese Company Inc. of Richfield for $270.5 million.

== Brands ==
Fully owned or exclusively-held brands include:

- Alpenhaus
- Black Diamond
- Black River
- Chevrion
- County Line
- Great Midwest
- Ilchester
- Il Giardino
- Joan of Arc
- King's Choice
- Landana
- Mun-chee
- Nikos
- Organic Creamery
- Prima Donna
- Salemville

In 2004 the company was awarded the Ernst & Young Entrepreneur of the Year award for Wisconsin for its excellence in the Wholesale/Retail Distribution category.

In 2007 the company won Refrigerated & Frozen Food Retailer magazine's Category Colonel Award for Specialty Cheese.

== See also ==
- List of cheesemakers
