= Maine's Own Organic Milk Company =

Dairy company in Maine, United States

Maine's Own Organic Milk Company, L3C, LLC
- Founded: 2009
- Headquarters: Augusta, Maine, USA
- Products: MOOMilk Dairy products

Maine’s Own Organic Milk Company, L3C, or MOOMilkCo, was a low-profit, partly farmer-owned, L3C corporation set up to help Maine organic family dairy farms maintain a market and achieve profitability. It was established with 10 organic dairy farms that were dropped by H.P. Hood, a large dairy product distributor.

The company allocated 90% of profits back to the farms as payment for their milk, and "the remaining 10% will be retained for the business end of the company, which is a joint effort of the Maine Farm Bureau and the Maine Organic Farmers and Gardeners Association."

On May 17, 2014, the company ended production. It terminated its agreement with Smiling Hill Farm, its exclusive processor because of equipment failure: an "antiquated carton filler" that was "not capable of meeting the current and future requirements of MOO." Although the MOO brand is no more, the company is still seeking to secure some other long-term contract for its farmers.

== History ==
After Hood stopped buying milk from the farms involved, they approached several other companies, including Horizon Organic, Stonyfield Farm and Organic Valley, as well as local producers, about the possibility of selling milk to them, but were rejected. In April 2009, the group made an agreement with Smiling Hill Farm, a local milk producer, for processing, and Oakhurst Dairy agreed to transport the products. Funding for MOOMilk, which needed $500,000 to begin operations, was provided by the state of Maine, as well as from private sources, including Stonyfield Farm. At its beginning, MOOMilk sold milk to Hannaford, Associated Grocers of Maine and dozens of independent stores in Maine.

The company began selling milk in January 2010, but within a year ran into financial troubles. Its revenue was inadequate, and it relied on a mix of private investment and grant money to continue operating. With a minimal advertising budget, the company struggled to find consumers willing to purchase its milk, and several of its founding members left. By September 2010, with only $1,400 in cash assets, the company was forced to partially stop production of milk. At the time, the company was able to pay bills to its farmers, but was unable to cover its overhead costs. In December 2010, Whole Foods Market stores in Massachusetts began selling MOOMilk products, but even so, the company still needed outside money in order to survive.

The story of Maine's Organic Milk Company (MOOMilk) has been documented by Pull-Start Pictures in the documentary, "Betting the Farm".
