= Wainwright Dairy =

American dairy company

Wainwright Dairy is a creamery established by Carl Wainwright in Live Oak, Florida. The dairy produces pasteurized but nonhomogenized cream-on-top milk and Colby cheese, pepper jack cheese, baby Swiss cheese, cheddar, and chipotle cheese. The dairy was established in 1972 and added the creamery in 2009 Their Baby Swiss, Marble Cheddar, Cheddar, Sharp Cheddar, Chipotle Cheddar, Provolone, Mozzarella, Longhorn Cheddar and Muenster are available at Ward’s Market in Gainesville.
