= Hey Brothers Ice Cream =

Defunct creamery based in Illinois, USA

Hey Brothers Ice Cream, based in Sterling, Illinois, was a respected milk and ice cream producer throughout northwestern Illinois during most of the 20th century. Hey Brothers was important because the company was an innovator with high sanitation and quality standards.

In December, 1906, Clement Hey purchased a milk business and renamed it Hey’s Milk Depot. In 1907, brothers Abram, Ira, and Henry, along with sisters Verna and Mary invested and the company was renamed Hey Brothers Milk Depot. In 1913, at 214 E. 3rd Street, Sterling, Hey Brothers built the “largest and most modern plant of the kind in northern Illinois.”

In 1937, Hey Brothers gained recognition for building a “modern dairy barn” and “the first electronic milking parlor in Illinois” with the following innovations: electrified fly killing doors, hot and cold running water, a glass barrier creating a separate and sanitary milk parlor, vacuum lines(DeLaval system), and electric milk cooling tank. (The “2008 Whiteside County Barn Tour” featured this Hey barn.) Beginning in the 1930s, to obtain premium milk, the Hey Brothers purchased electric milk coolers for farmers, and then paid the farmers extra for their milk, which allowed the farmers to pay off the milk coolers with the bonus.

In 1937, the Illinois Supreme Court sided with Hey Brothers against the City of Rockford and invalidated an ordinance requiring state licensed companies to buy yet another license from Rockford. The Sterling Daily Gazette called this verdict “an important victory for manufacturers with plants outside the city of Rockford.”

As part of a series, “They Helped Make Sterling,” the Sterling Daily Gazette featured Clement Hey on January 29, 1947.

Besides the Sterling dairy, Hey Brothers eventually built ice cream plants in Dekalb, Quincy, and Dixon, Illinois. By the 1980s, since Dixon was President Reagan’s boyhood home, Hey Brothers was producing a “Dutch Chocolate Ice Cream.”

With the emergence of national brands, and the decline of neighborhood grocery stores, Hey Brothers steadily lost markets, ceasing its final operation of ice cream production at its Dixon plant in the early 1990s.
