= List of Irish cheeses =

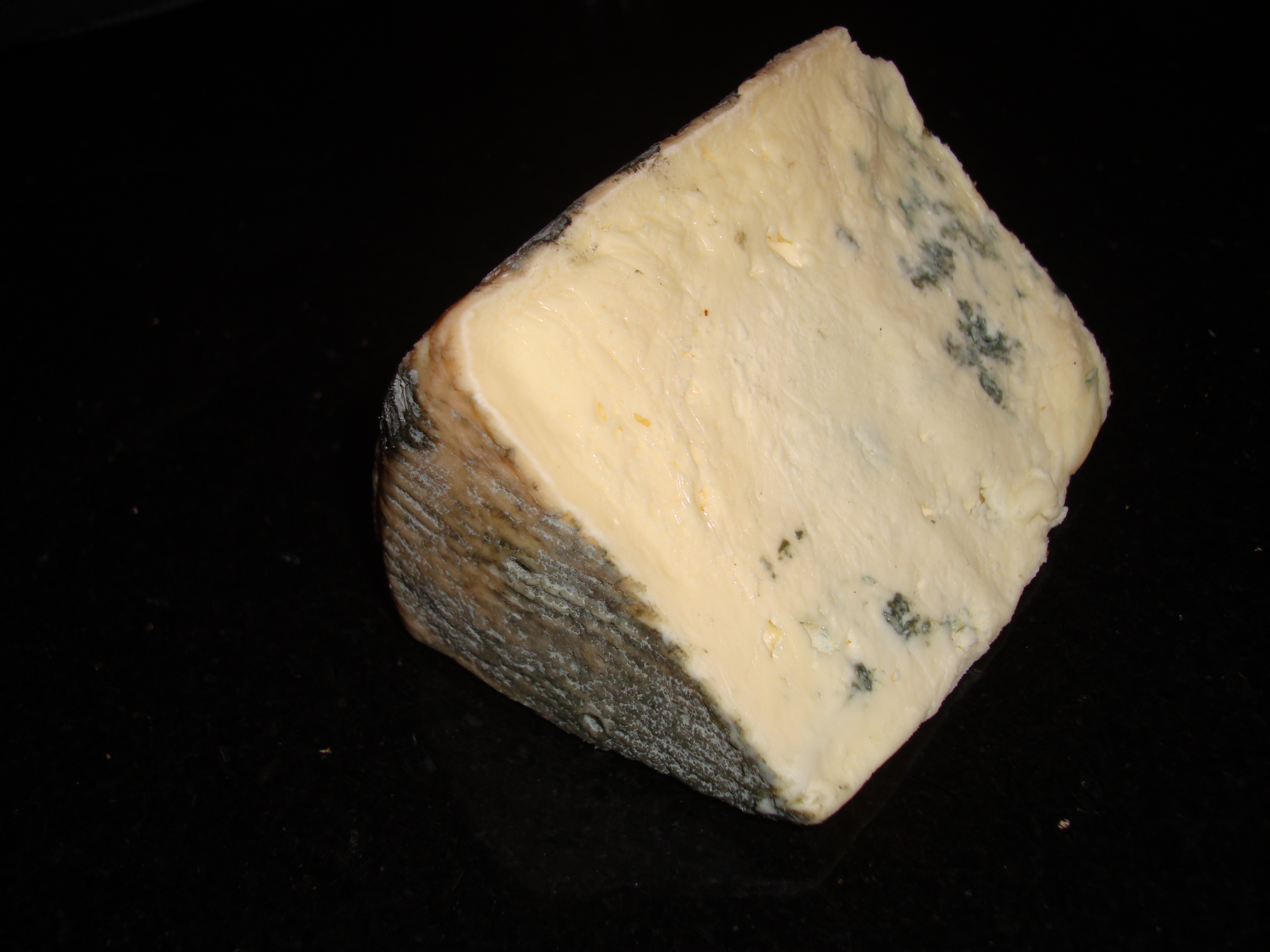
Cashel Blue Farmhouse Cheese

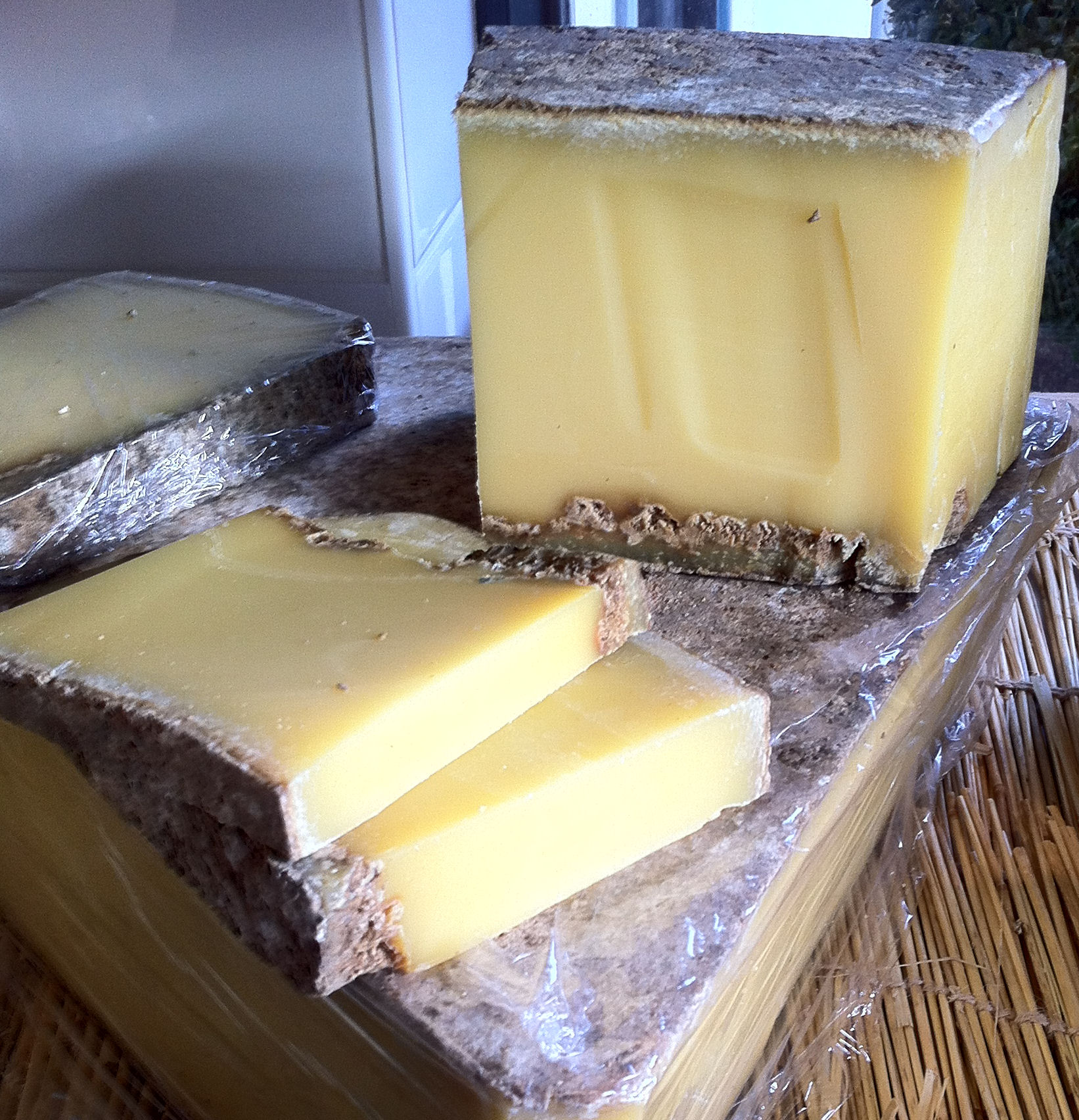
Glebe Brethan

This is a list of cheeses and producers from Ireland.

== List of Irish cheese producers ==
Name	County	Type	Milk	Rennet
Abbey Cheese Company (Closed)	County Laois	Cow	Pasteurised	Vegetarian
Ardagh Castle cheese	County Cork	Goat	Raw	Vegetarian
Ardrahan Cheese	County Cork	Cow	Pasteurised	Vegetarian
Ardsallagh Goats Products	County Cork	Goat	Pasteurised	Vegetarian
Bay Lough cheese	County Tipperary	Cow	Raw	Vegetarian
Béal Organic Cheese	County Kerry	Cow	Raw	Traditional
Bó Rua Farm	County Cork	Cow	Pasteurised	Vegetarian
Blue Rathgore	County Antrim	Goat		Vegetarian
Bluebell Falls Cheese	County Cork	Goat	Heat treated	Vegetarian
Burren Gold	County Clare	Cow	Raw	
Cahills Farm cheese	County Limerick	Cow	Pasteurised	Vegetarian
Carlow Cheese	County Carlow	Sheep	Raw	Traditional
Carrigaline Farmhouse Cheese	County Cork	Cow	Pasteurised	Vegetarian
Carrigbyrne cheese	County Wexford	Cow	Pasteurised	Vegetarian
Carrowholly cheese	County Mayo	Cow	Raw	Vegetarian
Causeway Cheese	County Antrim	Varies	Pasteurised	Vegetarian
Cleire Goats Cheese	County Cork	Goat	Raw	N/A
Clonmore Cheese	County Cork	Varies	Heat treated	Vegetarian
Coleraine cheddar	County Londonderry	Cow	???	Vegetarian
Coolattin Cheddar	County Carlow	Cow	Raw	Traditional
Coolea Cheese	County Cork	Cow	Pasteurised	Traditional
Cooleeney Farmhouse Cheese	County Tipperary	Varies	Varies	Vegetarian
Cordal Goat Cheese	County Kerry	Goat	Pasteurised	Vegetarian
Corleggy Cheese	County Cavan	Varies	Raw	Vegetarian
Cratloe Hills	County Clare	Sheep	Pasteurised	Vegetarian
Croghan Cheese	County Wexford	Goat	Raw	Vegetarian
Dart Mountain Cheese	County Londonderry	Cow	Pasteurised	Vegetarian
Dingle Peninsula Cheese	County Kerry	Cow	Raw	Vegetarian
Doolin Cheese	County Waterford	Cow		
Dubliner Cheese	County Cork	Cow	Heat treated	Vegetarian
Durrus Cheese	County Cork	Cow	Raw	Traditional
Fermoy Natural Cheese	County Cork	Cow	Raw	Traditional
Fivemiletown Creamery	County Tyrone	Cow, Goat	Pasteurised	Vegetarian
Gleann Gabhra	County Meath	Goat	Pasteurised	Vegetarian
Glebe Brethan	County Louth	Cow	Raw	Traditional
Glyde Farm Produce	County Louth	Cow	Raw	Vegetarian
Gubbeen Farmhouse Cheese	County Cork	Cow	Pasteurised	Traditional
Hegarty's Cheese	County Cork	Cow	Pasteurised	Vegetarian
J&L Grubb	County Tipperary	Varies	Pasteurised	Varies
JOD Foods	County Limerick	Cow	Pasteurised	Vegetarian
Killeen Farmhouse Cheese	County Galway	Varies	Pasteurised	Traditional
Killorglin Cheese	County Kerry	Cow	Pasteurised	Traditional
Knockalara Farmhouse Cheese	County Waterford	Varies	Pasteurised	Vegetarian
Knockanore Farmhouse Cheese	County Waterford	Cow	Raw	Vegetarian
Knockatee Cheese	County Kerry	Cow	Raw	Traditional
Knockdrinna Farmhouse Cheese	County Kilkenny	Varies	Pasteurised	Vegetarian
Milleens	County Cork	Varies	Pasteurised	Traditional
Millhouse Sheeps Cheese	County Offaly	Sheep	Raw	Vegetarian
Moonshine Farm Cheese	County Westmeath	Cow	Pasteurised	Vegetarian
Mossfield Organic Farm	County Offaly	Cow	Pasteurised	Vegetarian
Mount Callan Cheddar	County Clare	Cow	Raw	Traditional
Old MacDonnells Farm Cheese	County Wicklow	Varies	Pasteurised	Vegetarian
Orchard Cottage Dairy	County Cork	Goat	Raw	Vegetarian
Orla Cheese	County Cork	Sheep	Raw	Vegetarian
The Little Milk Company	County Waterford	Cow	Organic	Varies
The Lost Valley Dairy & Creamery	County Cork	Cow	Raw	Traditional
St Tola	County Clare	Goat	Varies	Traditional
Triskel Cheese	County Waterford	Varies	Raw	Traditional
West Cork Natural Cheese	County Cork	Cow	Raw	Vegetarian
Wicklow Farmhouse Cheese	County Wicklow	Cow	Pasteurised	Vegetarian

== List of Irish cheeses ==
Cheese Name	Type	Milk	Rennet	Notes	Producer
Abbey Blue Brie	Cow	Pasteurised	Vegetarian	Semi-soft blue	Abbey Cheese Company (closed)
Abbey Smoked Brie	Cow	Pasteurised	Vegetarian	Semi-soft smoked Brie	Abbey Cheese Company (Closed)
Ardagh Castle Gjetost	Goat	Raw	Vegetarian		Ardagh Castle Cheese
Ardagh Castle Goats Cheese	Goat (from whey)	Raw	Vegetarian	Wensleyday style, hard	Ardagh Castle cheese
Ardagh Castle Ricotta	Goat (from whey)	Raw	Vegetarian	Ricotta	Ardagh Castle cheese
Ardrahan (and smoked)	Cow	Pasteurised	Vegetarian	Semi-soft, smoked	Ardrahan Cheese
Ardsallagh Hard Goat's Cheese	Goat	Pasteurised	Vegetarian	Semi-hard	Ardsallagh Goats Products
Ardsallagh Soft Goat's Cheese	Goat	Pasteurised	Vegetarian	Soft	Ardsallagh Goats Products
Ballintubber Cheddar with Chives	Cow	Pasteurised	Vegetarian		Cahills Farm cheese
Ballybrie	Cow	Pasteurised	Vegetarian	Soft creamy Brie	Fivemiletown Creamery
Ballyblue	Cow	Pasteurised	Vegetarian	Soft blue Brie	Fivemiletown Creamery
Ballyoak	Cow	Pasteurised	Vegetarian	Soft smoked Brie	Fivemiletown Creamery
Ballyhooly Blue	Cow	Raw	Traditional		Fermoy Natural Cheese
Ballyporeen with Mixed Irish Herbs	Cow	Pasteurised	Vegetarian		Cahills Farm cheese
Bay Lough Cheddar (original, smoked, and varieties)	Cow	Raw	Vegetarian		Bay Lough cheese
Béal Handmade Cheddar	Cow	Raw	Traditional		Béal Organic Cheese
Béal Raw Milk Cheddar	Cow	Raw	Traditional		Béal Organic Cheese
Beara Blue	Cow	Raw	Traditional	Blue Stilton style	Knockatee Cheese
Bellingham Blue	Cow	Raw	Vegetarian	Semi-hard blue	Glyde Farm Produce
Bluebell Falls Cygnus	Goat	Heat treated	Vegetarian		Bluebell Falls Cheese
Bluebell Falls Cygnus with Honey	Goat	Heat treated	Vegetarian		Bluebell Falls Cheese
Bluebell Falls Cygnus with Pepper	Goat	Heat treated	Vegetarian		Bluebell Falls Cheese
Bluebell Falls Orion	Goat	Heat treated	Vegetarian		Bluebell Falls Cheese
Bluebell Falls Pegasus	Goat	Heat treated	Vegetarian		Bluebell Falls Cheese
Boilie Cheese Pearls	Cow	Pasteurised	Vegetarian	Soft creamy cheese pearls marinated in peppercorns infused in a garlic oil	Fivemiletown Creamery
Boilie Goats Cheese Pearls	Goat	Pasteurised	Vegetarian	Soft creamy cheese pearls marinated in peppercorns infused in a garlic oil	Fivemiletown Creamery
Bó Rua Farm	Cow	Pasteurised	Vegetarian		Bó Rua Farm
Boyne Valley Blue	Cow	Raw	Vegetarian		Glyde Farm Produce
Burren Gold	Cow	Raw			Burren Gold
Cahill's Ardagh Wine Cheese	Cow	Pasteurised	Vegetarian		Cahills Farm cheese
Cahill's Original Irish Porter Cheese	Cow	Pasteurised	Vegetarian		Cahills Farm cheese
Cahill's Whiskey Cheese	Cow	Pasteurised	Vegetarian		Cahills Farm cheese
Cais Dubh	Cow	Raw	Traditional		Fermoy Natural Cheese
Cais Rua	Cow	Raw	Traditional		Fermoy Natural Cheese
Carlow Cheese	Cow	Raw	Traditional	Edam style	Carlow Cheese
Carlow sheep cheddar	Sheep	Pasteurized	Traditional	Cheddar style	Carlow Cheese
Carlow Cheese Flavoured	Cow	Raw	Traditional	Flavoured Edam style	Carlow Cheese
Carraignamuc	Cow	Raw	Traditional	Semi-soft Tomme style, natural starter	The Lost Valley Dairy & Creamery
Carrigaline	Cow	Pasteurised	Vegetarian		Carrigaline Farmhouse Cheese
Carrigaline Beech Smoked	Cow	Pasteurised	Vegetarian		Carrigaline Farmhouse Cheese
Carrigaline Garlic & Herb	Cow	Pasteurised	Vegetarian		Carrigaline Farmhouse Cheese
Carrowholly	Cow	Raw	Vegetarian	Gouda style	Carrowholly cheese
Carrowholly Cheese Flavoured	Cow	Raw	Vegetarian	Gouda style	Carrowholly cheese
Cashel Blue	Cow	Pasteurised	Vegetarian	Blue	J&L Grubb
Chulchoill	Goat	Pasteurised	Vegetarian		Cooleeney Farmhouse Cheese
Cleire Goats Cheese	Goat	Raw	N/A	Cheese curd	Cleire Goats Cheese
Clonmore Cheese	Goat	Heat treated	Vegetarian	Gouda style	Clonmore Cheese
Coleraine cheddar	Cow	???	Vegetarian	Cheddar style	Coleraine cheddar
Coolattin Cheddar	Cow	Raw	Traditional	Cheddar style	Coolattin Cheddar
Coolea Cheese	Cow	Pasteurised	Traditional	Gouda style	Coolea Cheese
Cooleeney Farmhouse Cheese	Cow	Raw	Vegetarian	Camembert style	Cooleeney Farmhouse Cheese
Natural Goats Log	Goat	Pasteurised	Vegetarian	Creamy, lemony fresh tang	Fivemiletown Creamery
Corkotta	Cow	Raw	Traditional	Made from whey	Fermoy Natural Cheese
Corleggy Goat's Cheese	Goat	Raw	Vegetarian		Corleggy Cheese
Cratloe Hills	Sheep	Pasteurised	Vegetarian	Pecorino style	Cratloe Hills
Creeny	Sheep	Raw	Vegetarian	Pecorino style	Corleggy Cheese
Croghan	Goat	Raw	Vegetarian		Croghan Cheese
Crozier Blue	Sheep	Pasteurised	Vegetarian	Blue	J&L Grubb
Daru	Cow	Pasteurised	Vegetarian		Cooleeney Farmhouse Cheese
Desmond	Cow	Raw	Vegetarian	Thermophilic (Swiss style)	West Cork Natural Cheese
Dilliskus	Cow	Raw	Vegetarian		Dingle Peninsula Cheese
Doolin	Cow				Doolin Cheese
Dromana Flavoured	Cow	Pasteurised	Vegetarian		Knockalara Farmhouse Cheese
Drumlin	Cow	Raw	Vegetarian		Corleggy Cheese
Dubliner	Cow	Heat treated	Vegetarian	Cheddar style	Dubliner Cheese
Duhallow	Cow	Pasteurised	Vegetarian	Semi-hard	Ardrahan Cheese
Dunbarra	Cow	Pasteurised	Vegetarian	Camembert style	Cooleeney Farmhouse Cheese
Durrus Cheese	Cow	Raw	Traditional		Durrus Cheese
Emerald	Cow	Raw	Traditional		Fermoy Natural Cheese
Emerald Irish Brie	Cow	Pasteurised	Vegetarian	Brie	Carrigbyrne cheese
Fivemiletown Cheddar Range	Cow	Pasteurised	Vegetarian	Mild, medium, mature, extra mature, lighter mature, mild and medium sliced	Fivemiletown Creamery
Gabriel	Cow	Raw	Vegetarian	Thermophilic (Swiss style)	West Cork Natural Cheese
Gleann Oir	Goat	Pasteurised	Vegetarian	Brie	Cooleeney Farmhouse Cheese
Glebe Brethan	Cow	Raw	Traditional	Comté style	Glebe Brethan
Gortnamona	Goat	Pasteurised	Vegetarian	Camembert style	Cooleeney Farmhouse Cheese
Gubbeen	Cow	Pasteurised	Traditional		Gubbeen Farmhouse Cheese
Hegarty's Cheddar	Cow	Pasteurised	Vegetarian	Cheddar style	Hegarty's Cheese
Hegarty's Smoked Cheddar	Cow	Pasteurised	Vegetarian	Beechwood smoked Cheddar	Hegarty's Cheese
Hibernia	Cow	Raw	Traditional		Fermoy Natural Cheese
Imokilly Regato	Cow	Pasteurised	Traditional	Protected Designation of Origin (PDO)	Dairygold
Kerry Blue	Cow	Raw	Traditional	Blue Stilton style	Knockatee Cheese
Kilcummin	Cow	Raw	Vegetarian		Dingle Peninsula Cheese
Killeen Cow's Cheese	Cow	Pasteurised	Traditional	Gouda style	Killeen Farmhouse Cheese
Killeen Goat's Cheese	Goat	Pasteurised	Traditional	Gouda style	Killeen Farmhouse Cheese
Knockalara Semi-Hard Sheeps Cheese	Sheep	Pasteurised	Vegetarian		Knockalara Farmhouse Cheese
Knockalara Sheep's Cheese	Sheep	Pasteurised	Vegetarian		Knockalara Farmhouse Cheese
Knockanore Flavoured	Cow	Raw	Vegetarian		Knockanore Farmhouse Cheese
Knockanore Plain	Cow	Raw	Vegetarian	Cheddar style	Knockanore Farmhouse Cheese
Knockanore Smoked	Cow	Raw	Vegetarian	Smoked applewood	Knockanore Farmhouse Cheese
Knockatee Cheddar	Cow	Raw	Traditional	Cheddar style	Knockatee Cheese
Knockatee Gouda	Cow	Raw	Traditional	Gouda style	Knockatee Cheese
Knockdrinna Fresh Goats Log	Goat	Pasteurised	Traditional		Knockdrinna Farmhouse Cheese
Knockdrinna Goat's Brined Cheese	Goat	Pasteurised	Traditional	Feta style	Knockdrinna Farmhouse Cheese
Knockdrinna Gold	Goat	Pasteurised	Traditional	Tomme style	Knockdrinna Farmhouse Cheese
Knockdrinna Meadow Sheep's Cheese	Sheep	Pasteurised	Traditional	Tomme style	Knockdrinna Farmhouse Cheese
Knockdrinna Snow	Goat	Pasteurised	Traditional	Camembert style	Knockdrinna Farmhouse Cheese
Lavistown	Cow	Pasteurised	Traditional		Knockdrinna Farmhouse Cheese
Maighean	Cow	Raw	Vegetarian	Camembert style	Cooleeney Farmhouse Cheese
Milleens	Cow	Pasteurised	Traditional	Munster style	Milleens
Millhouse Sheep's Cheese	Sheep	Raw	Vegetarian		Millhouse Sheep's Cheese
Mine-gabhar	Goat	Raw	Vegetarian		Croghan Cheese
Moonshine Organic Cheese	Cow	Pasteurised	Vegetarian	Organic	Moonshine Farm Cheese
Mossfield	Cow	Pasteurised	Vegetarian	Organic, Gouda style	Mossfield Organic Farm
Mossfield Flavoured	Cow	Pasteurised	Vegetarian	Organic, Gouda style	Mossfield Organic Farm
Mossfield Mature	Cow	Pasteurised	Vegetarian	Organic, Gouda style	Mossfield Organic Farm
Mount Callan Cheddar	Cow	Raw	Traditional	Cheddar style	Mount Callan Cheddar
Oakwood	Cow	Pasteurised	Vegetarian	Naturally smoked mature cheddar, also comes in grated bags	Fivemiletown Creamery
Old Irish Creamery Cheddar (with additions)	Cow	Pasteurised	Vegetarian		JOD Foods
Old Irish Creamery Extra Mature White Cheddar	Cow	Pasteurised	Vegetarian		JOD Foods
Old Irish Creamery Smoked Cheddar	Cow	Pasteurised	Vegetarian		JOD Foods
Old MacDonnells Fresh Cow's Cheese	Cow	Pasteurised	Vegetarian		Old MacDonnells Farm Cheese
Old MacDonnells Fresh Goat's Cheese	Goat	Pasteurised	Vegetarian		Old MacDonnells Farm Cheese
Orchard Cottage Fresh Goat's Cheese	Goat	Raw	Vegetarian		Orchard Cottage Dairy
Orchard Cottage Goat's Cheese in Oil	Goat	Raw	Vegetarian		Orchard Cottage Dairy
Orla Cheese	Sheep	Raw	Vegetarian		Orla Cheese
Paddy Jack Cheese	Cow	Pasteurised	Vegetarian	Gouda style	Abbey Cheese Company (Closed)
Shandrum	Cow	Heat treated	Vegetarian	Gouda style	Clonmore Cheese
Smoked Ardrahan	Cow	Pasteurised	Vegetarian		Ardrahan Cheese
Smoked Gubbeen	Cow	Pasteurised	Traditional		Gubbeen Farmhouse Cheese
Sperrin Blue	Cow	Pasteurised	Vegetarian		Dart Mountain Cheese
St Brendan	Cow	Pasteurised	Vegetarian	Brie	Carrigbyrne cheese
St Brendan Brie Mini	Cow	Pasteurised	Vegetarian	Brie	Carrigbyrne cheese
St Brigid	Cow	Raw	Traditional		Fermoy Natural Cheese
St Brigid Beag	Cow	Raw	Traditional		Fermoy Natural Cheese
St Gall	Cow	Raw	Traditional		Fermoy Natural Cheese
St Kevin Brie	Cow	Pasteurised	Vegetarian		Wicklow Farmhouse Cheese
St Killian	Cow	Pasteurised	Vegetarian		Carrigbyrne cheese
St Tola Divine	Goat	Pasteurised	Traditional	Organic	St Tola
St Tola Hard Goat's	Goat	Raw	Traditional	Organic	St Tola
St Tola Log	Goat	Raw	Traditional	Organic	St Tola
Tara Ban	Goat	Pasteurised	Vegetarian	Goat's Cheddar style	Gleann Gabhra
Templegall	Cow	Raw	Vegetarian	Comté cheese style	Hegarty's Cheese
The Little Milk Company Mild	Cow	Organic Pasteurised	Vegetarian	Cheddar	The Little Milk Company
The Little Milk Company Mature	Cow	Organic Raw	Traditional	Cheddar	The Little Milk Company
The Little Milk Company Vintage	Cow	Organic Raw	Traditional	Cheddar	The Little Milk Company
The Little Milk Company Brie	Cow	Organic Pasteurised	Traditional	Brie	The Little Milk Company
The Little Milk Company Brewers Gold	Cow	Organic Pasteurised	Traditional		The Little Milk Company
Tipperary Brie	Cow	Pasteurised	Vegetarian	Brie	Cooleeney Farmhouse Cheese
Triskel Dew Drop	Goat	Raw	Traditional		Triskel Cheese
Triskel Gwenned	Cow	Raw	Traditional		Triskel Cheese
Triskel Pyramid	Goat	Raw	Traditional		Triskel Cheese
Vincenzo's Pecorino	Sheep	Raw	Goat		Carlow Cheese
Waterford Greek Cheese	Cow	Pasteurised	Vegetarian		Knockalara Farmhouse Cheese
Wicklow Baun	Cow	Pasteurised	Vegetarian		Wicklow Farmhouse Cheese
Wicklow Blue	Cow	Pasteurised	Vegetarian		Wicklow Farmhouse Cheese
Wicklow Gold	Cow	Pasteurised	Vegetarian		Wicklow Farmhouse Cheese
Wilma's Killorglin Cheese	Cow	Pasteurised	Traditional	Gouda style	Killorglin Cheese
Wilma's Killorglin Flavoured Cheese	Cow	Pasteurised	Traditional	Gouda style	Killorglin Cheese

== See also ==
- List of British cheeses
- List of Republic of Ireland food and drink products with protected status
- List of cheeses
- List of cheesemakers
