= Northern Irish cuisine =

Culinary traditions of Northern Ireland

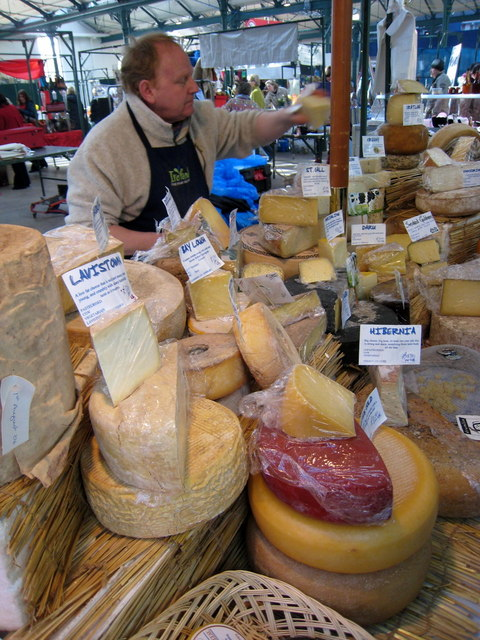
St George's Market, Belfast

Northern Irish cuisine encompasses the cooking styles, traditions and recipes associated with Northern Ireland. It has distinctive attributes of its own, but has also drawn heavily from Irish and British cuisines.

== History ==
Northern Ireland's culinary heritage has its roots in the staple diet of generations of farming families: bread and potatoes. Historically, limited availability of ingredients and low levels of immigration resulted in restricted variety and relative isolation from wider international culinary influences.

Recent decades have seen significant developments in the local cuisine, characterised by an increase in the variety, quantity and quality of gastropubs and restaurants. There are currently two Michelin-starred restaurants in Northern Ireland, all of which specialise in traditional dishes made using local ingredients.

== Dishes and foods ==
=== Breads ===
Potato bread is a flat bread prepared with potato, flour, and buttermilk. It is cooked on a griddle. Also known as fadge or tatie bread.

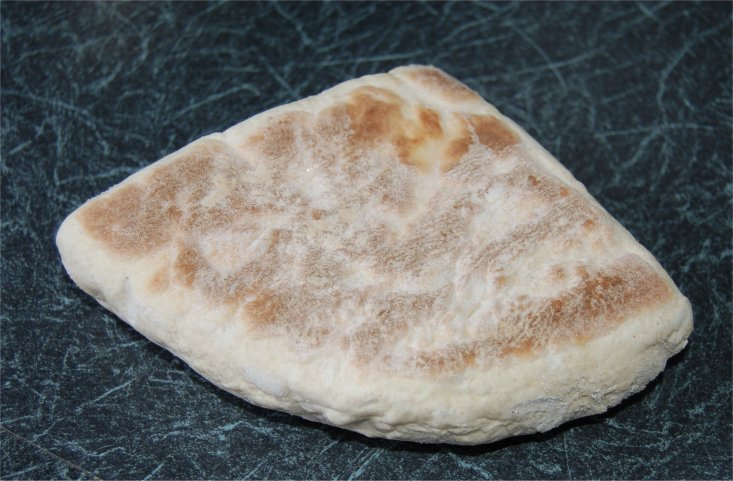
A soda bread farl

Soda bread is one of Northern Ireland's griddle breads; it can be eaten straightaway, or cooked until golden in an Ulster fry. They are sometimes eaten with butter and homemade jam, or with savory food such as smoked salmon, fresh fried eel, or thick dry-cured bacon. Soda bread is a soft, thick and fluffy bread. It was first baked in the 1800s in Ireland, and local people used baking soda to cause the dough to rise. It is typically served with an Ulster fry.

Wheaten bread is a brown bread made with whole wheat flour which also uses baking soda as a rising agent. It is often sweetened in contrast to the savoury white soda bread.

Veda bread is a small, soft, caramel-colored, malted loaf, typically eaten as a slice with a cup of tea. Veda is often toasted and/or served with butter or margarine.

A Belfast bap is a large crusty but soft bread roll is traditionally filled with sausages, bacon and egg.

A plain loaf is a traditional style of dense, white loaf. It has a dark, well-fired crust on the top and bottom of the bread.

Barmbrack is a yeast bread with added sultanas and raisins. The bread is associated with Halloween and is often flavoured with whiskey.

In Ulster Presbyterian culture, there are a range of unique sandwiches that are served amongst the communities, typically at funerals. These include grape and cheese, apple and Mars Bar and chicken and grape sandwiches.

=== Savoury dishes ===
Ardglass potted herring is found in butchers' shops and fish traders. It is herring that is marinated in vinegar, rolled with bay leaf and baked with breadcrumbs.

Boxty, mainly found in County Fermanagh, is a weighty, starchy potato cake made with a 50:50 mix of cooked mashed potatoes and grated, strained, raw potato. The most common variety is boiled boxty, also known as hurley, a large round loaf which is boiled whole for several hours, allowed to rest and then sliced and fried, often with bacon.

Champ is made with potatoes mashed with milk and chopped scallions.

Irish stew is a hearty stew, traditionally made with root vegetables and lamb or mutton, but also commonly with beef. As in all traditional folk dishes, the exact recipe is not consistent from time to time or place to place.

Vegetable broth is a vegetable soup made throughout Ulster contains carrots, celery, thin leeks and parsley, thickened with red lentils and barley. Packets of these six ingredients are often sold together as "soup veg".

Dulse is a seaweed snack food. Originally, it was harvested by fishermen for income supplementation when fishing was meager.

Northern Irish Pasties are made from a mixture of sausage or minced beef, onions, and mashed potato, shaped like a burger and spiced with black pepper. They can be ordered battered from most chip shops.

Tobacco onions are a popular side dish or topping made from thinly sliced onions that are coated in seasoned flour and then deep-fried until they are crispy and golden brown.

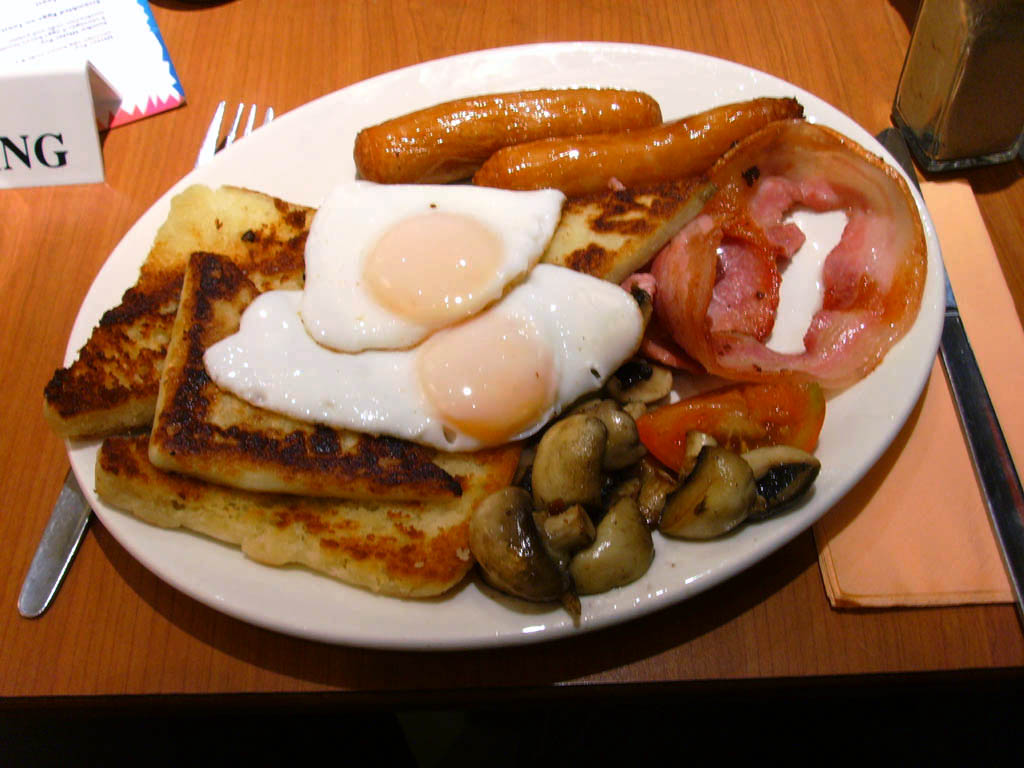
A full Ulster fry served in Belfast

The best known traditional dish in Northern Ireland is the Ulster fry. An Ulster fry, although not originally particularly associated with breakfast time, has in recent decades been marketed as Northern Ireland's version of a cooked breakfast. It is distinguishable from a full breakfast by its griddle breads—soda bread and potato bread, fried (or occasionally grilled) until crisp and golden, and sometimes also includes small pancakes. Bacon, sausages, an egg, and (as a modern development) tomato and sometimes mushrooms complete the dish. It is usually served with tea and toast.

Ulster seafood chowder is a creamy soup made with fish, potatoes and vegetables.

Black and white puddings are blood sausages, often enjoyed as part of the Ulster fry or in other dishes, are popular. White pudding is made without blood; it is made with pork meat and fat, suet, bread, and oatmeal. Both black and white puddings are available battered and deep-fried in most chip shops.

With its lengthy coastline and large loughs, Northern Ireland has an abundance of seafood. Smoked salmon, Irish oysters, and other fresh catches are popular, especially in coastal areas. The town of Royal Hillsborough hosts an annual oyster festival.

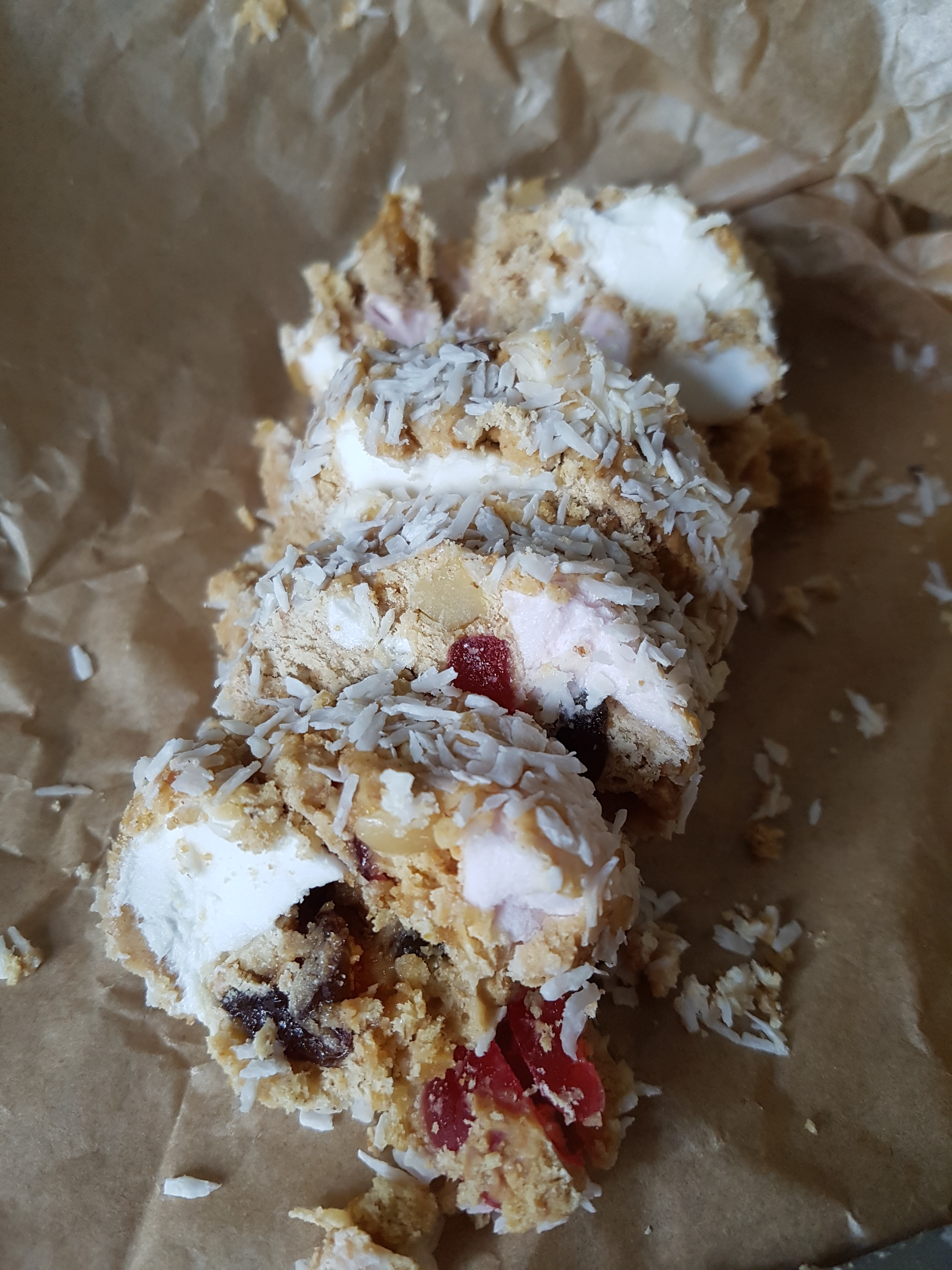
Fifteens traybake

A vegetable roll is in fact made of beef, vegetables such as leeks and scallions and seasoned with fresh herbs. It is shaped like a sausage and often comes sliced to be grilled and paired with potatoes and seasonal vegetables.

=== Cakes and confectionery ===
Fifteens is a soft tray bake cake which gets its name from using fifteen of each main ingredient (marshmallows, digestive biscuits, cherries).

Gravy ring is a ringed, dark-coloured and slightly crunchy doughnut, dusted in sugar. So-named because gravy is an archaic word for cooking oil in Ulster.

A Paris bun is an Ulster-Scots food, they are a sweetened bread-like cake similar to scones, roughly cone-shaped, and topped with pearl sugar.

A Florence cake is a Madeira-style cake covered in glace icing with a glace cherry on top in a pastry case spread with raspberry jam.

Cream horns are horn-shaped puff pastries with sweetened cream.

Yellowman is a crunchy golden confectionery and looks a bit like honeycomb. It is mainly sold at local sweetshops, fairs and markets.

=== Cheeses ===
- Blue Rathgore
- Boilie cheese
- Causeway Cheese
- Coleraine Cheddar
- Dart Mountain Cheese

=== Accompaniments ===
- Black butter (a dark spicy spread prepared from apples, cider and spices, including liquorice)

== Beverages ==
- Bushmills whiskey
- Brown lemonade
- Ginger ale
- Maine (soft drinks, lemonade, soft drinks and diluted juice)
- Punjana tea
- Nambarrie tea
- Armagh ciders (produced in the county renowned for its orchards)
- Derry Milk (a beer hand-crafted from chocolate stout and organic cow’s milk)

== Notable Northern Ireland chefs ==
- Jenny Bristow
- Michael Deane
- Noel McMeel
- Robbie Millar
- Paul Rankin
- Clare Smyth
