= Farmstead cheese =

Cheese made on the farm where its milk is collected

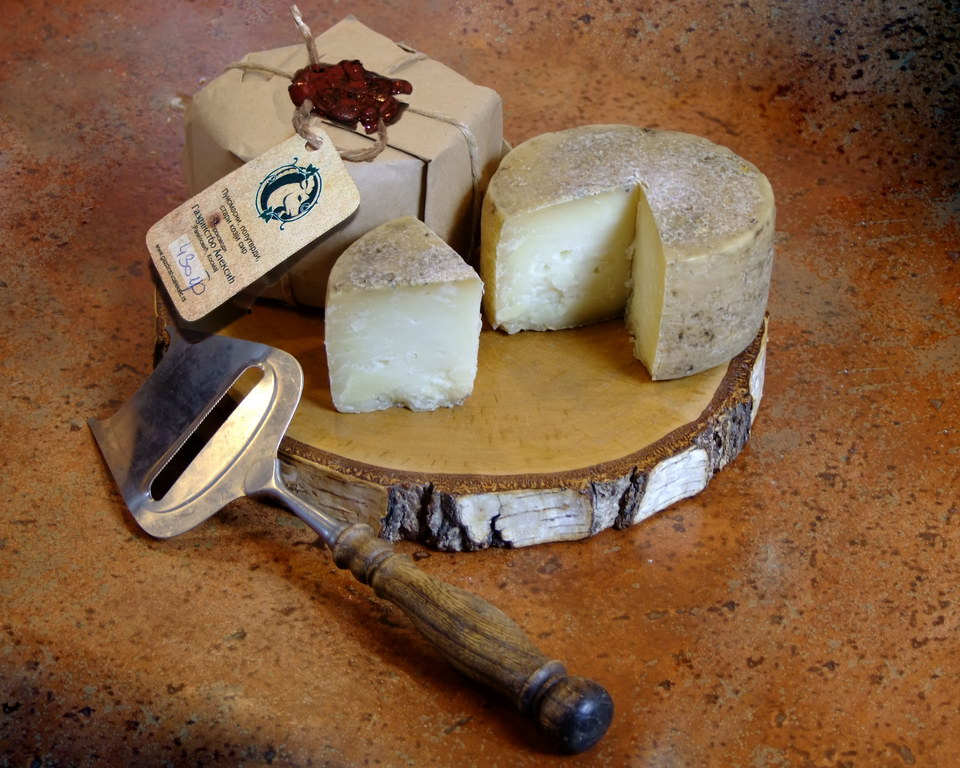
A farmstead goat's milk cheese

Farmstead cheese, more commonly known in Europe as farmhouse cheese, is produced from the milk collected on the same farm where the cheese is produced. Unlike artisan cheese, which may also include milk purchased and transported from off-farm sources, farmstead cheese makers use milk only from animals they raise. According to the American Cheese Society, "milk used in the production of farmstead cheeses may not be obtained from any outside source". As a result, the cheeses produced often have unique flavors owing to the farm's local terroir. Most farmstead cheese is produced from cow, goat or sheep milk, although some farmstead cheeses are produced from water buffalo milk (mainly Buffalo mozzarella).

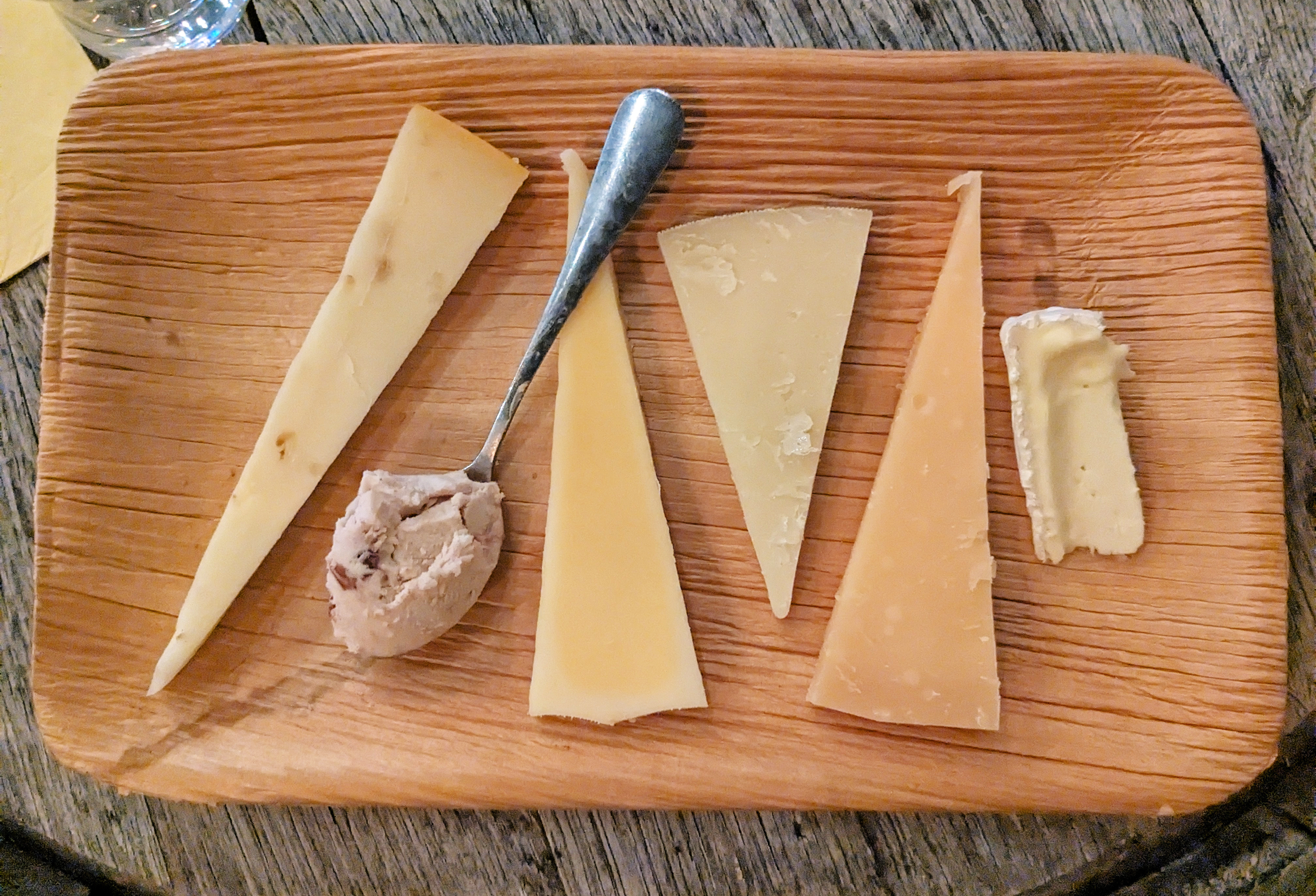
A selection of farmstead cheeses produced in Minnesota, Wisconsin, and New York.

Farmstead cheeses are most often made on family farms in small batches and are often sold at local farmers' markets. While Europe has long had a very strong tradition of farmstead cheese-making, it is only in the last decades of the 20th century that farmstead cheese-making began to return to prominence in North America. In the United States, the top states for farmstead cheesemaking include Vermont, California, and Wisconsin, although farmstead cheese is growing rapidly in other states, like Georgia, as well. North Carolina is another state that has recently gained accolades for its farmstead cheeses, even creating the WNC Cheese Trail.

In Europe, these cheeses are more commonly known as farmhouse cheeses and there are many different varieties available, especially from Ireland and Germany. The small scale of production allows for unique sales points such as cheese from cows raised on non-genetically modified organisms (GMOs)-containing feed.

== See also ==
- List of cheeses
- Ardrahan Farmhouse Cheese
- Corleggy Cheese
- Durrus Farmhouse Cheese
- Gubbeen Farmhouse Cheese

== External Sites ==
- Farmhouse Cheese Information - Bord Bia | Irish Food Board
