= Bleu d'Élizabeth =

Canadian blue cheese

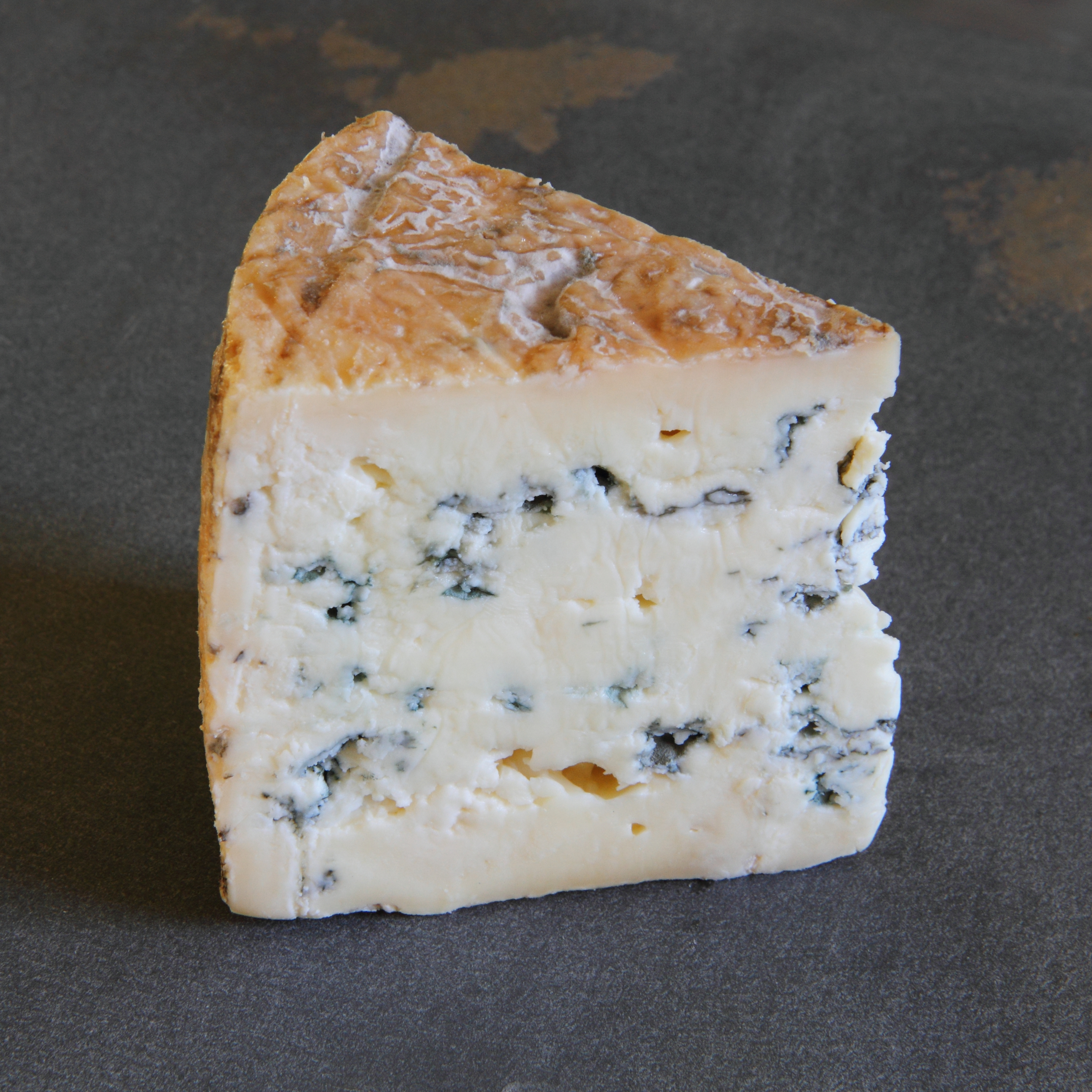
- Other names: Bleu de Haut-Jura, Bleu de Septmoncel
- Country of origin: Canada
- Region: Sainte-Élizabeth-de-Warwick, Quebec
- Source of milk: cows
- Pasteurized: blue-veined cheeses

Bleu d'Élizabeth is a brand used to commercially identify a farmhouse cheese made from thermized cow's milk produced organically in Canada, in the province of Quebec in Sainte-Élizabeth-de-Warwick. This brand belongs to the owners of the Louis d'Or farm.

== Presentation ==
Bleu d'Élizabeth is a semi-firm, blue-veined cow 's milk cheese. Its rind is dotted with ocher spots and the cheese contains bluish or greenish furrows due to the presence of penicillium roqueforti. This cheese has a smell of cream, butter, cellar and contains 28% fat. Each cheese weighs 1200 grams.

According to Sue Reidl, writing for The Globe and Mail, the flavor is mellow.

== Raw milk processing ==
The raw milk produced by the Louis d'Or farm is transformed using industrial means into Bleu d'Élizabeth at the Fromagerie du Presbytère, an agricultural dairy processing tool installed in a former presbytery. The process implemented is inspired by well-known French cheeses such as Fourme d'Ambert, Bleu d'Auvergne, etc. However, raw milk undergoes thermization. Refining is 60 days.

== Bibliography ==
- Bizier, Richard & Nadeau, Roch, Quebec Cheese Directory, Trécarré, Montreal, 2008, p. 65.
- Tendland, Amélie, Cheeses: 100 Quebec products to discover, Éditions Caractère, Montreal, 2012, p. 220
