= Fivemiletown =

Village in County Tyrone, Northern Ireland

Coordinates: 54.379881°N 7.312593°W

Fivemiletown: Irish: Baile na Lorgan
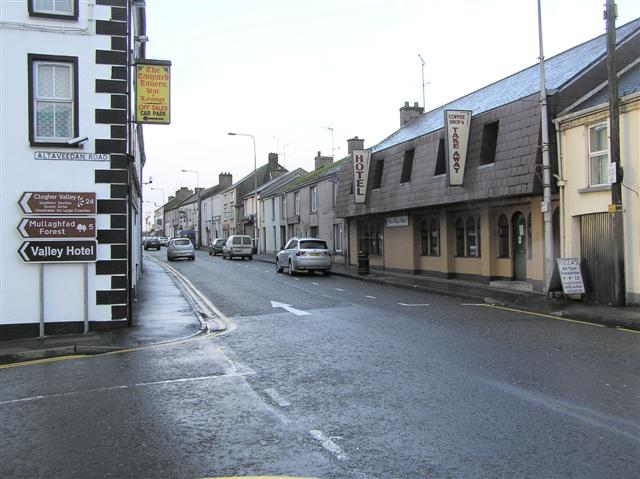
- Main Street

- Location within Northern Ireland
- Population: 1,341 (2021 census)
- Irish grid reference: H445478
  - Belfast: 64 miles (103 km)
- District: Mid Ulster
- County: County Tyrone
- Country: Northern Ireland
- Sovereign state: United Kingdom
- Post town: FIVEMILETOWN
- Postcode district: BT75
- Dialling code: 028
- UK Parliament: Fermanagh and South Tyrone
- NI Assembly: Fermanagh and South Tyrone

Fivemiletown is a village and townland in County Tyrone, Northern Ireland. It is 16 miles (26 km) east of Enniskillen and 26 mi (42 km) west-south-west of Dungannon, on the A4 Enniskillen-to-Dungannon road.

Fivemiletown's population was 1,341 at the 2021 census. The village creamery, Fivemiletown Creamery, was begun as a cooperative in 1898 by Hugh de Fellonburg Montgomery. It originally made butter and milk, but now makes cheeses for the British and Irish market, and for export across Europe and North America.

== Name ==
Fivemiletown's name comes from its location five Irish miles (1 Irish mile = 1.27 statute miles = 2044 m) from its nearest neighbours: Clogher, Brookeborough and Tempo. The original Irish name of the townland of Fivemiletown was Baile na Lorgan – 'townland of the long ridge' – anglicised as Ballynalurgan. Previous names for the village of Fivemiletown were Mount Stewart, from Sir William Stewart who founded it in 1619 and Blessingbourn from the name of the nearby residence of Colonel Montgomery, the proprietor of the area in the early 19th century.

== History ==
The Clogher Valley Railway ran from Tynan, County Armagh, to Maguiresbridge, County Fermanagh, with Fivemiletown being one of its main stations. The old station house is still one of the landmarks in the village. The trains stopped at the Buttermarket on Main Street and the creamery to be loaded or unloaded with goods.

After the Second World War, the growth of road transport made railways almost redundant and when the Northern Ireland Government learned that the Clogher Valley Railway had operated as a loss for 27 years because of growing road transport, it recommended the shutting of the line. The last train ran on the last day of 1941, bringing to an end one of Fivemiletown's most characteristic features.

=== The Troubles ===
Incidents in Fivemiletown during the Troubles resulting in two or more deaths:

- 12 December 1993 – Andrew Beacom (46) and Ernest Smith (49), both Protestant members of the Royal Ulster Constabulary (RUC) from the RUC base at Clogher, were ambushed and shot dead by members of the Provisional Irish Republican Army's East Tyrone Brigade while on patrol in their civilian-type car along Main Street after midnight. A British Army Lynx helicopter received automatic fire while chasing the perpetrators.

== Geography ==
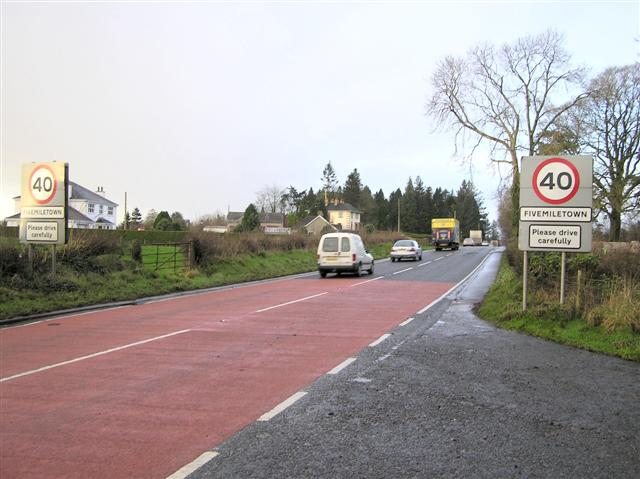
Entering Fivemiletown via the Ballagh Road

Halfway between Fivemiletown and Fintona 9 miles (14 km) northwest, lies Murley Mountain. This mountain rises to a peak of 312 metres (1,024 ft) above sea level and marks the western edge of the Clogher Valley.

On the summit is the Lendrums Bridge wind farm, one of the biggest in Northern Ireland, with 20 wind turbines. Another ten are planned for the neighbouring Hunter's Hill. Murley Mountain's location is lonely and exposed, especially to prevailing southwesterly winds. This makes it a prime site for wind-generated power.

The River Blackwater runs through counties Tyrone and Armagh, as well as County Monaghan. The source of the Blackwater is to the north of Fivemiletown. There are also several small lakes around the village which draw many anglers.

== Transport ==
- The narrow gauge Clogher Valley Railway ran through the village from 1887 until 1942. The train originally had a top speed of 10 miles per hour (16 km/h). Fivemiletown railway station opened on 2 May 1887 and was shut on 1 January 1942.
- The A4 is the main route into Fermanagh (and on to County Sligo) from the Belfast direction. Running from the end of the M1 at Dungannon, the section through the Clogher Valley is the lowest standard on the whole route. While towns and villages along the A4 in Fermanagh were generally bypassed years ago, the A4 runs straight through the middle of three Tyrone villages: Augher, Clogher and Fivemiletown. These are now the only non-bypassed settlements on the road. The largest of these, Fivemiletown, will be bypassed. The village currently has a one-way system to cope with the heavy traffic on the narrow main street, but this stalls long-distance traffic and is a big inconvenience to residents of the village. The new road will be built to 2+1 standard, meaning that there will be one lane in one direction, with two in the opposite direction to permit overtaking. On longer routes, such as this one, the overtaking lane usually alternates giving an overtaking opportunity to traffic in each direction. The scheme will complement a 2+1 scheme completed on the A4 outside Fivemiletown in 2004.

== Sport ==
Fivemiletown United Football Club play in the Mid-Ulster Football League. Clogher Valley Rugby Football Club play in the All-Ireland League.

== Demography ==
Fivemiletown is classified as a village by the Northern Ireland Statistics and Research Agency (NISRA) (i.e. with population between 1,000 and 2,499 people). On Census Day (27 March 2011) the usually resident population of Fivemiletown Settlement was 1,243, accounting for 0.07% of the NI total. Of these:

- 19.23% were aged under 16 and 18.25% were aged 65 and over
- 48.75% of the population were male and 51.25% were female
- 23.17% were from a Catholic background and 72.0% were from a 'Protestant and Other Christian (including Christian related)' background
