= Glyde Farm Produce =

Irish cheese company

Bellingham Blue
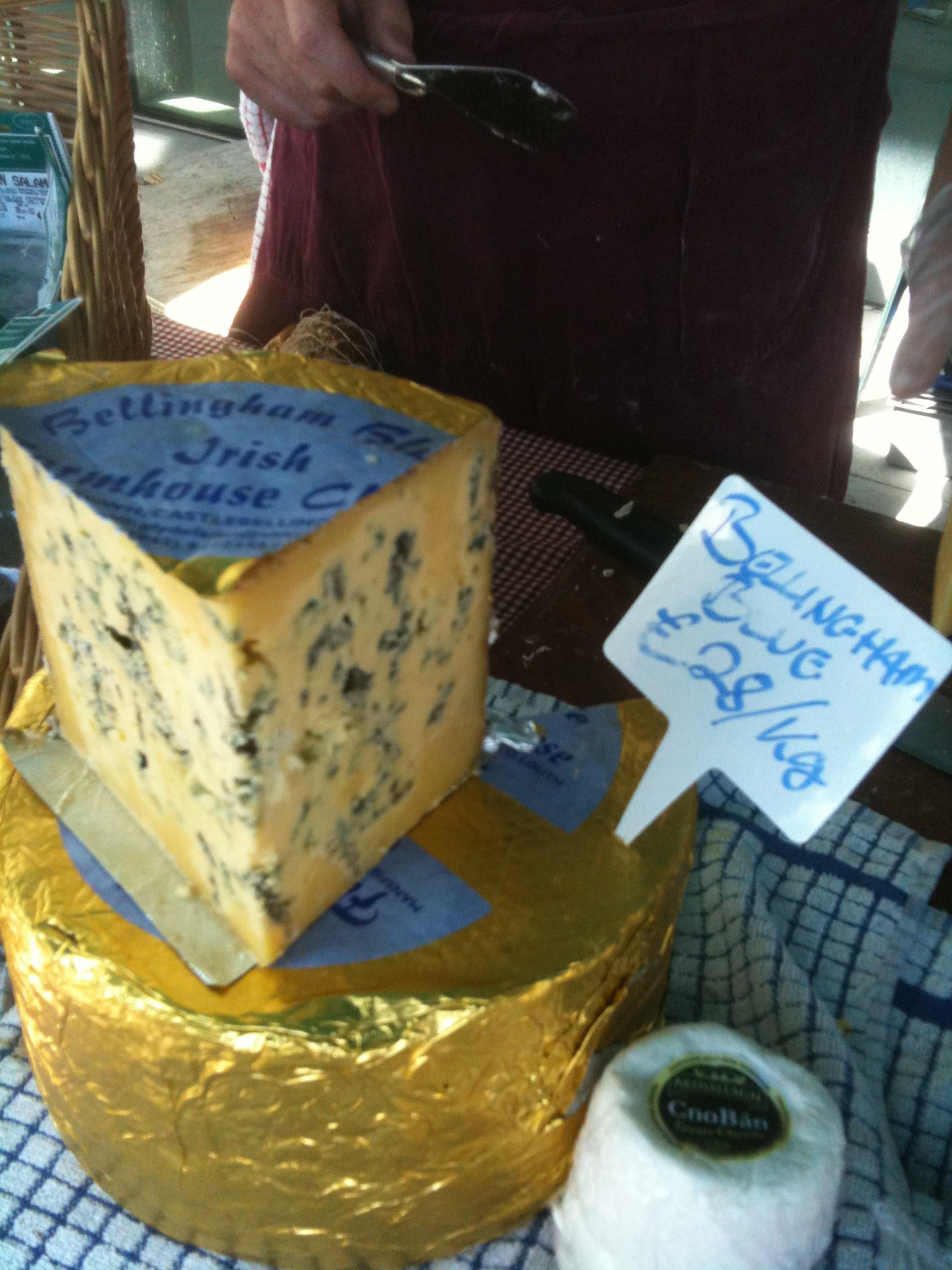
- Country of origin: Ireland
- Region, town: Mansfieldtown
- Region: County Louth
- Town: Castlebellingham
- Source of milk: Cow
- Pasteurised: No
- Weight: 3–4 kg (6.6–8.8 lb), 1-2kg, 500–800 g (18–28 oz), 200g
- Aging time: 4 months

Glyde Farm Produce was set up in 1996 by Peter Thomas who spent the next several years researching the market in Ireland for suitable dairy products. Peter and Anita Thomas started making Bellingham Blue cheese at their family farm at Mansfieldtown in County Louth, Ireland, in 2000.

== Bellingham Blue ==
Bellingham Blue is a firm blue cheese made from unpasteurized cow's milk. It has a strong flavour with a salty finish, and the texture is crumbly and grainy. All the milk used is from their own herd of Friesians using raw milk.

== Boyne Valley Blue ==
In 2011, Peter and Michael Finnegan began production of a version of Bellingham Blue made from raw goat's milk.

== Awards ==
Bellingham Blue won a Gold Medal award at the British Cheese Awards in 2001. In 2008, Bellingham Blue was awarded a silver medal at the World Cheese Awards. In 2010, it won the Supreme Champion at the Irish Cheese Awards.

== See also ==
- List of cheesemakers
