= Abbey Cheese Company =

Irish cheese manufacturer

Abbey Cheese
- Country of origin: Ireland
- Region: County Laois
- Town: Portlaoise
- Source of milk: Friesian Cows
- Pasteurised: Yes

Abbey Cheese was an Irish cheese manufacturer, making cows' milk and goats' milk cheeses in Portlaoise, County Laois. The manufacturing company, Abo Cheese Company Limited, ended its operation in 2017.

It has been owned and run by Pat Hyland (also known as "Paddy wack") since 1991 from his dairy farm, and started as a way to increase revenues from surplus milk. The cows' milk is sourced from a local herd of Friesians. His first cheese was a soft blue cheese similar in style to Cambozola. While visiting Tom Holland, he was introduced to the advantages of becoming an organic producer and he eventually made the switch to organic farming. It was successful and since then Hyland has added other cheeses to his range.

== Products ==
- Abbey Blue Brie - was notable as being the first Irish blue Brie-style cheese.
- Abbey Smoked Brie - a creamy Brie with a smoky flavour achieved by smoking over ash for five hours
- St Canice - a feta-style cheese made from goat's milk
- Paddy Jack - a distinctive Gouda-style cheese covered in black ash
