= J&L Grubb =

Irish cheesemaker

J&L Grubb is an Irish cheese manufacturer, making cows' milk and goats' milk cheeses on their farm near Fethard, County Tipperary.

== History ==
In 1984, the Grubbs began to make around eight Cashel Blue cheeses at their farm from the milk of their own herd of Holstein-Friesian cows. Originally the cheese was produced using an old 90-litre copper brewer's vat and sold in local shops and markets.

In 1991, the Grubbs were joined by Guert Van den Dikkenberg who became their head cheesemaker.

In 1993, Henry Brown, a nephew of Louis Grubb, began to make blue cheese from sheep's milk but it wasn't until 1999 that the cheese was manufactured in commercial quantities at Grubb's facilities.

== Types ==
=== Cashel Blue ===
Cashel Blue
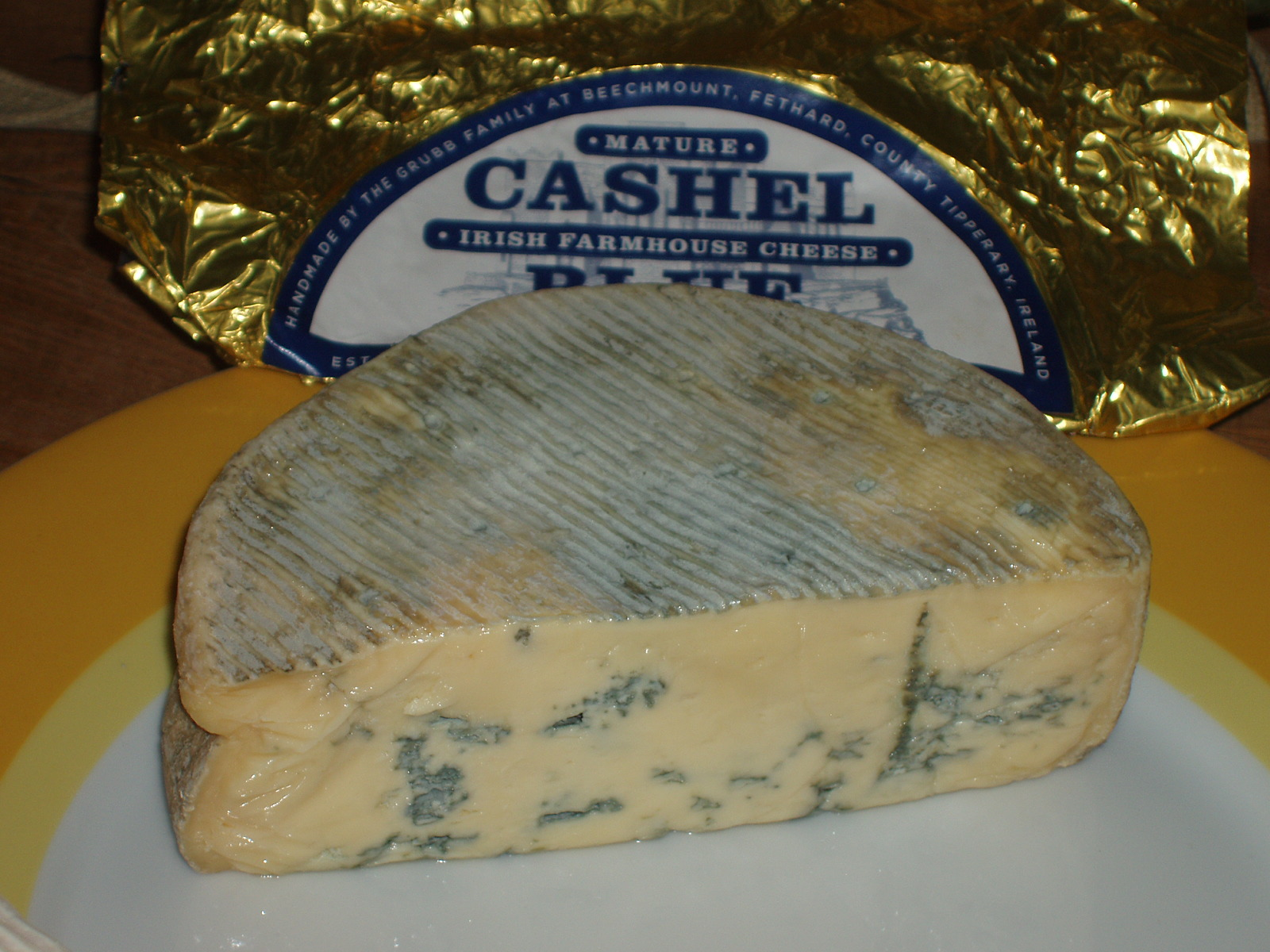
- Country of origin: Ireland
- Region: County Tipperary
- Town: Fethard
- Source of milk: Cow
- Pasteurised: Yes

Cashel Blue is a hand-made, semi-soft, mildly blue veined and slightly acidic blue cheese with a creamy texture, made from cows' milk. Over half the milk used in the production of Cashel Blue comes from their own farm, with the rest sourced from farms located nearby. The cheese was named after the Rock of Cashel overlooking the pastures close to the farm. It has large blue flecks, made by the action of Penicillium roqueforti, the same fungus used in Roquefort, Stilton, and other blue cheeses.

US food store chain Trader Joe sells Cashel Blue flavoured Irish potato chips.

=== Crozier Blue ===
Crozier Blue is a hand-made, semi-soft, blue-veined, medium-strength blue cheese with a creamy texture. Made in Ireland, this is one of the country's few blue cheeses, made from sheep's milk. It is made on the farm of Jane and Louis Grubb by their daughter Sarah Furno. Crozier Blue is a more recent creation from the farm which produces a sister cheese Cashel Blue cheese made using cow's milk.

== Awards ==
Cashel Blue is widely acclaimed and has won numerous awards. The highlights are:

- 1993: First (Blue Cheese Class ) Royal Dublin Society Farmhouse Cheese Competition
- 1998: Silver, Ireland's International Cheese Awards
- 2000: Gold, British Cheese Awards
- 2001: Gold, World Cheese Awards
- 2002: Bronze, World Cheese Awards
- 2004: Bronze, British Cheese Awards
- 2004: Gold, Listowel Food Fair, National Farmhouse Cheese Competition (Ireland)
- 2005: Bronze British Cheese Awards
- 2006: Gold, World Cheese Awards
- 2009: Gold, Bronze, World Cheese Awards
- 2010: Gold, World Cheese Awards
- 2012: Silver, World Cheese Awards
- 2013: Bronze, World Cheese Awards
- 2014: Gold, International Cheese Awards
- 2014: Gold, Irish Cheese Awards
- 2015: Silver, Mondial Du Fromage
- 2016: Gold, World Cheese Awards
- 2017: Gold, World Cheese Awards
- 2017: Gold, International Cheese Awards
- 2019: Bronze, World Cheese Awards
- 2021: Gold, Irish Cheese Awards
- 2021: Gold, International Cheese Awards

Crozier Blue has won many prestigious awards, the highlights being:

- 2003: Gold, British Cheese Awards
- 2003: Gold, World Cheese Awards
- 2007: Supreme Champion, Premio Roma
- 2010: Gold, World Cheese Awards
- 2011: Gold, Irish Cheese Awards
- 2012: Gold, Irish Cheese Awards
- 2013: Gold, Irish Cheese Awards
- 2015: Super Gold, World Cheese Awards
- 2017: Super Gold, Mondial Du Fromage
- 2017: Gold, Irish Cheese Awards
- 2018: Silver, World Cheese Awards
- 2019: Gold, World Cheese Awards
- 2019: Gold, Irish Cheese Awards
- 2021: Super Gold, World Cheese Awards
