= Bay Lough Cheese =

Irish dairy

- Country of origin: Ireland
- Region: County Tipperary
- Town: Clogheen
- Source of milk: Friesian Cows
- Pasteurised: Mostly No
- Texture: Closed
- Weight: 3.5 kg (7.7 lb) wheels, 3-400g waxed sections
- Aging time: 3-4 months, min 8 months for mature

Bay Lough Cheese is an Irish dairy owned and operated by husband and wife, Dick and Anne Keating. Bay Lough Cheese produces cheddar-style cheeses using vegetarian rennet and unpasteurised milk. A small amount of cheese is also produced using pasteurised milk.

Originally an attempt to provide her family with cheese from their surplus milk, Anne's experiments in cheese making were hampered by a lack of experience and knowledge. After a number of relatively unsuccessful attempts, an improved cheese was developed that had business potential. Typically considered a trade that must be taught, the Keating's are Ireland's only self-taught cheesemakers. They were also among the early adopters of naturally bandaging (coating with wax) cheese.

== Products ==
- Bay Lough Cheddar is prepared with a yellow wax rind.
- Bay Lough Cheddar Smoked has a brown wax rind.
- Bay Lough Cheddar with Garlic and Herbs has a black wax rind.
- Bay Lough Cheddar Smoked with Garlic and Herbs is produced with an orange wax rind.

== Awards ==
1994 Royal Dublin Show - First Prize

== See also ==
- List of Irish cheeses
