= Hegarty's Cheese =

Irish cheese manufacturer

- Country of origin: Ireland
- Region: County Cork
- Town: Whitechurch
- Source of milk: Friesian Cows
- Pasteurised: Some

Hegarty's Cheese is an Irish cheese manufacturer making three different cows milk cheese in Whitechurch, County Cork. Hegarty's cheese first started in 2001 by Dan Hegarty on the family farm and was joined in 2016 by Jean-Baptiste Enjelvin, a cheesemaker from France.

== Products ==
- Hegarty's Cheddar - was the first cheese made on the farm and is made from pasteurized milk using traditional methods.
- Templegall - is a Swiss-style raw milk cheese in the style of Comté cheese and has won numerous awards
- Hegarty's Smoked Cheddar - is the same cheese as Hegarty's Cheddar but is naturally smoked with beechwood providing a strong flavour

== Awards ==
- In 2019, Templegall won the gold medal in the Raw Milk category at the Irish Cheese Awards
- In 2021, Templegall won the Supreme Champion award at the Irish Cheese Awards as well as gold medals in the "Mature Hard Cheese" and "Raw Milk Cheese" categories
- In 2024, Templegall won for the second time in a row the Supreme Champion awards at the Irish cheese awards as well as the Supreme champion title at the artisan cheese awards in Melton Mowbray (UK).
