= Pastie =

Northern Ireland dish of battered deep-fried meat and vegetables

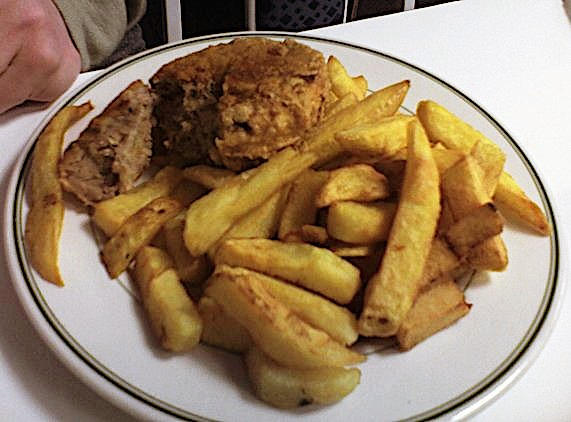
A pastie supper

A pastie /ˈpæstiː/ is a large to medium-sized battered deep-fried round of minced meat and vegetables common to Northern Ireland. Generally served with chips to form a "pastie supper" ("supper" in Northern Irish chip shops means something with chips), or in a white roll as a "pastie bap" or "pastie burger" it is a common staple in most fish and chip shops in parts of the country.

Recipes vary, but the most common ingredients are minced pork, onion, potato and seasoning formed into a "round" (just like a burger), which is then covered in a batter mix and deep fried. Traditionally, chip shops coloured the pastie's filling with a cochineal dye, giving it a bright pink colour, supposedly to make the snack more appetising. Many shops have stopped using this method due to cochineal allergies.

== See also ==
- Northern Irish cuisine
- List of Irish dishes
- Pastry
- Pasty
