= Carrigaline Farmhouse Cheese =

Irish cheese company

- Country of origin: Ireland
- Region: County Cork
- Town: Carrigaline
- Source of milk: Cows
- Pasteurised: yes
- Texture: semi-soft
- Weight: 150g, 200g, 400g round. 1kg and 1.8kg wheel
- Aging time: best at 12 weeks or older

Carrigaline Farmhouse Cheese is a maker of semi-soft cheese made from cow's milk in Carrigaline, County Cork in Ireland. The O'Farrell family have produced cheeses on their farm in County Cork since 1988 using milk from their Friesian cow herd. The O'Farrell family business has since grown into a producer of artisan cheeses which have won several accolades and international cheese awards.

It is a vegetarian cheese made with whole milk and vegetarian rennet, and is made into rounds of 150g, 200g and 400g, or wheels of 1 kg (2.2 lb) or 1.8 kg (4.0 lb). The producers recommended that the cheese be matured for 12 weeks before eating.

Carrigaline exports approximately 20% of their cheese to Europe and the US, and their cheese is also sold domestically in supermarkets and independent retailers.

The company's products have received several awards including bronze, silver and gold medals at the British Cheese Awards, silver medals at the International Cheese Awards, gold (in the smoked cheese category) of the World Cheese Awards, and Best Irish Cheese at the Artisan Cheese Awards.
