= Béal Organic Cheese =

- Country of origin: Ireland
- Region: County Kerry
- Town: Listowel
- Source of milk: Cows

Béal Organic Cheese is made by Kate Carmody at Béal Lodge Dairy Farm, a small family-run dairy farm of Holstein cows on 56 acres located by the mouth of the River Shannon in Listowel, County Kerry in Ireland. It is a cheddar cheese and claims to be the first Irish produced using organic farming and methods. Béal Organic Cheese is handmade from cow's milk.

== History ==
Kate Carmody began making cheese in 1987, after her mother presented her with a gift consisting of a cheese press and a book on making cheese. In 1997, she began the process of converting to organic production. She achieved full organic status in 2000, becoming the first organically produced Irish Cheddar cheese.

In 2010, Carmody appeared on Dragons' Den in Ireland where she secured an investment of €50,000.

== Products ==
There are three products in the Béal Organic Cheese range, although the availability of the cheese is subject to seasonal availability:

- Béal Mild Organic Irish Cheddar is made from pasteurised milk and vegetarian rennet.
- Béal Handmade Mature Organic Cheddar is made from pasteurised milk and vegetarian rennet.
- Béal Raw Milk Mature Organic Cheddar is made from raw unpasteurised milk and vegetarian rennet, and takes up to nine months to fully mature.

== Awards ==
- 2009: Silver, World Cheese Awards
