= Mossfield Organic Farm =

Cheese farm in Ireland

Mossfield Mature
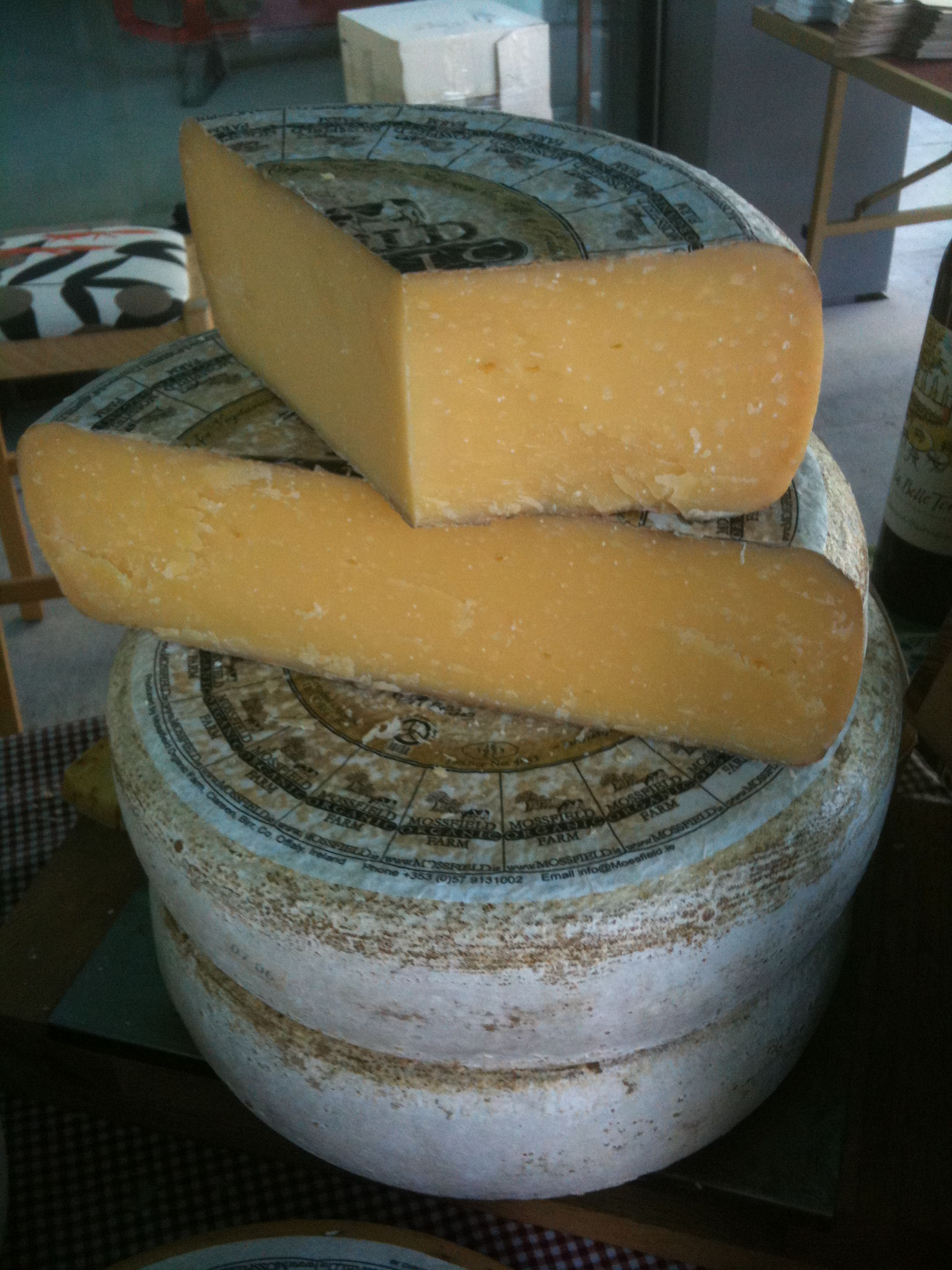
- Country of origin: Ireland
- Region: County Offaly
- Town: Birr
- Source of milk: Cows

Mossfield Organic Farm is a 300-acre dairy farm in Birr, County Offaly, in Ireland. Owned by Ralph Haslam, it was converted to organic farming in 1999 and since 2005 has produced a number of products using milk from his Friesian cows.

== Products ==
Mossfield Mature is an organically certified Gouda-style cheese. The cheese is aged for over eight months.

There is also a range of Mossfield Flavoured cheeses:

- Garlic & Basil
- Tomato & Herb
- Mature
- Young Plain
- Cumin Seed

In addition to cheese the farm produces milk, buttermilk and yogurt.

== Awards ==
The cheese has won many awards including the Gold Medal at the World Cheese Awards in 2006, and was the overall winner at the 2010 National Organic Awards.
