= Gleann Gabhra =

Irish cheese company

Coordinates: 53.573492°N 6.495853°W

- Country of origin: Ireland
- Region: County Meath
- Town: Macetown, Tara
- Source of milk: Goat
- Pasteurised: Yes
- Texture: Semi-Soft
- Aging time: Three months

Gleann Gabhra is a small award-winning Irish cheese company owned by Dominic and Fionnuala Gryson located in Macetown near the Hill of Tara in County Meath, Ireland, producing a single cheese, Tara Bán, a mild-flavoured goat's Cheddar with a firm texture and brilliant white colour. Dominic and Fionnuala Gryson began producing cheese here in 2010 using pasteurised milk from his herd of goats.

The farm began in 1996 with the purchase of eight hectares (20 acres) to grow beef, grain and potatoes. An unsuccessful attempt to raise and sell goat's milk led to the purchase of a pasteurisation unit in 2010. They began making cheese and selling at local markets; by 2011, the farm had grown to a herd of 140 dairy goats with a yield of between 900 and 1,000 L (200 and 220 imp gal; 240 and 260 US gal) of milk annually. They are currently making a wide variety of goat's milk products, and have made claims that goat's milk can relieve a number of ailments.

== Awards ==
In 2010, Tara Bán won a gold medal at the British Cheese Awards as best hard cheese.

== See also ==
- List of goat milk cheeses
