= Killeen Farmhouse Cheese =

Irish cheese company

- Country of origin: Ireland
- Region: County Galway
- Town: Portumna
- Source of milk: Goat, Cow
- Pasteurised: Yes
- Texture: Semi-hard, hard
- Weight: 500kg

Killeen Farmhouse Cheese is a small farmhouse cheese maker based from a farm on the banks of the river Shannon near Portumna County Galway, Ireland.

== History ==
Killeen Farmhouse Cheese was begun in 2004 by Marion Roeleveld on a farm on the northern coast of Lough Derg outside Portumna in County Galway. Roeleveld trained in cheesemaking in her native Netherlands but had no first-hand personal experience in making cheese. She first started making individual cheese wheels to order and settled on a style of Gouda cheese made from goats' milk from her own herd of around 40 goats and cows' milk from a neighbour's herd.

Roeleveld's uses milk from her herd of Saanen goats, a breed popular in Switzerland. Today, Roeleveld has a herd of around 200 goats.

== Products ==
- Killeen Goat Gouda is made with pasteurised goats' milk in 5kg wheels and matured for between 2 and 12 months
- Killeen Cow Gouda is made with pasteurised cows' milk in 5kg wheels and matured for between 2 and 12 months

== Awards ==
Killeen Farmhouse Cheese is one of Ireland's most successful cheese makers and has won many prestigious awards including the title of "Supreme Champion" at the Irish Cheese Awards on multiple occasions and gold medals at the British Cheese Awards and the World Cheese Awards.

- 2011 British Cheese Awards - Best Goat Cheese
- 2011 Irish Cheese Awards - Supreme Champion
- 2011 World Cheese Awards - Best Irish and "Super Gold"
- 2012 British Cheese Awards - Best Irish Cheese, Best Modern British
- 2014 Irish Cheese Awards - Supreme Champion
- 2014 British Cheese Awards - Best Goat Cheese
- 2016 British Cheese Awards - Gold medal and Bronze medal
- 2018 British Cheese Awards - Best Modern British Cheese
- 2019 Irish Cheese Awards - Supreme Champion
- 2019 World Cheese Awards - Gold medal

== See also ==
- List of goat milk cheeses
