= Ardsallagh Goat Farm =

Irish cheese company

Ardsallagh Goats Cheese
- Country of origin: Ireland
- Region: County Cork
- Town: Carrigtwohill
- Source of milk: Goats
- Pasteurised: Yes

Ardsallagh Goat Farm is located at Carrigtwohill, County Cork. Three types of cheese are made from their own herd and from locally sourced goat's milk. The cheeses are suitable for vegetarians.

== Products ==
- Ardsallagh Natural Goat's Yogurt
- Ardsallagh Cranberry Roulade
- Ardsallagh Soft Goat's Cheese – aged from 4 days to 6 weeks.
- Ardsallagh Hard Goat's Cheese – aged for 3 months
- Ardsallagh Smoked Cheese – aged for 3 months

== Awards ==
- Irish Cheese Awards 2011. Gold – Cranberry Roulade
- British Cheese Awards 2011.
  - Silver – smoked cheese.
  - Bronze – soft cheese.
- British Cheese Awards 2010
  - Bronze – Cranberry Roulade
  - Silver – Smoked goat's cheese
- British Cheese Awards 2005. Gold – Honey Mustard Goat's Cheese

== See also ==
- List of goat milk cheeses
