= Cahill's Farm Cheese =

Irish cheese company

Cahill's
- Company type: Private
- Industry: Dairy
- Founded: 1902; 123 years ago
- Founder: David Cahill
- Headquarters: Newcastle West, Ireland
- Products: Cheese
- Website: cahillscheese.ie

Cahill's Farm Cheese
- Country of origin: Ireland
- Region, town: Newcastlewest
- Region: County Limerick
- Town: Newcastlewest
- Source of milk: Cows
- Fat content: 25%
- Weight: 200g, 400g, 1.1kg, 2.2kg

Cahill's Farm Cheese is a maker of handmade cheddar cheese from Newcastlewest County Limerick in Ireland. Cheese has been made on the Cahill family farm since the 1950s, but it was not until the 1980s that Cahill's began commercial cheese production end export.

== Products ==
All products are made from vintage cheddar cheese and blended with an added flavour. For example the producer's 'Ballintubber Cheese with Chives' is a black waxed cheese flavoured with fresh chives. And the 'Plain Porter Cheese' is a brown waxed cheese flavoured with Guinness. The products are made using vegetarian rennet.

== Awards ==
Cahill's Cheeses has won several international awards. These include:

- In 2014, Cahill's Ballinwood Smoked Cheddar won the Bronze medal for a smoked cheese at the Irish Cheese Awards.
- In 2015, Cahill's Farm Cheese won a gold medal at the International Cheese Awards held in Nantwich, Cheshire.
- In 2017, Cahill's Vintage Cheddar won a silver medal at the Mondial du Fromage event in Tours, France.
