= Gubbeen Farmhouse Cheese =

Brand of Irish cheese

Gubbeen
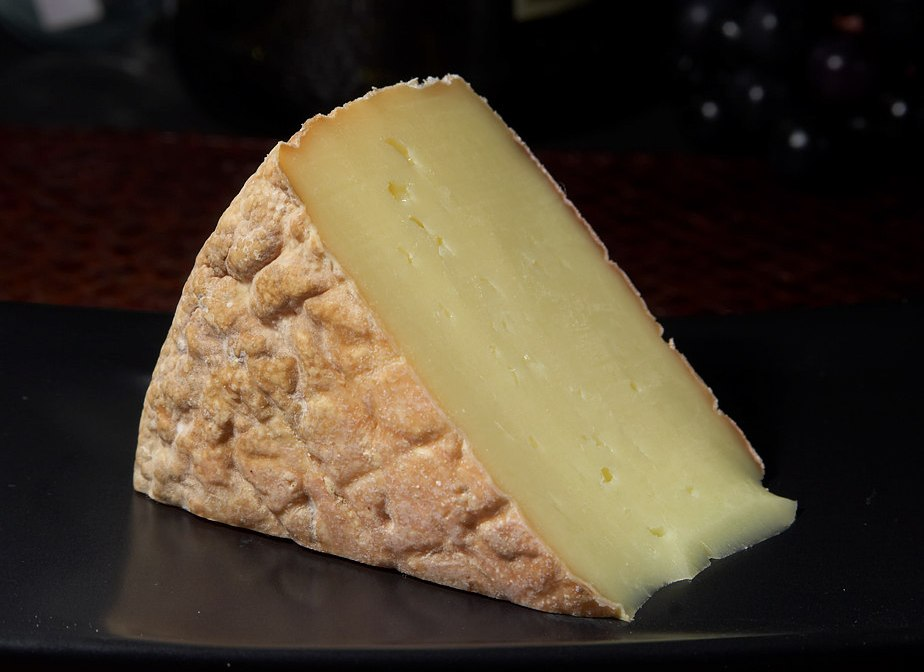
- Country of origin: Ireland
- Region: County Cork
- Town: Schull
- Source of milk: Cows
- Pasteurised: Yes
- Texture: Semi-soft
- Fat content: 48%
- Weight: 500–1,200 g (18–42 oz)

Gubbeen Cheese is a surface ripened, semi-soft, cow's milk cheese with a pink and white rind. The flavours are creamy with mushroom and nutty aftertastes but vary depending on maturity of cheese. Gubbeen Farmhouse Products also produce a Smoked Gubbeen.

Gubbeen Cheese has been produced since 1979 by Tom and Giana Ferguson at the 100 hectares (250 acres) Gubbeen Farm in Schull, County Cork. The name "Gubbeen" is an anglicisation of the Irish word goibín which means a small beak or mouth and is taken from the name of the townland the farm is in.

All milk used for the cheese comes from their own herd of dairy cows, which is a mixture of several breeds; British Friesian, Simmenthal, Jersey, and Kerry. The milk is stored in vats to which starter culture and rennet are added, causing the milk to set. This is then cut and stirred until the curds develop. The cheese is developed in curing rooms where the rind is washed daily. This is an important part of the process as the washing gives rise to the distinctive surface bloom and develops the characteristic flavours. The cheese develops deeper flavours as it matures.

In 2001, a new strain of lactic acid producing bacteria, Microbacterium gubbeenense, was named after a study into the smear-ripening of Gubbeen cheese.

Each cheese is 15 cm (5.9 in) in diameter, 5 cm (2.0 in) in height, weighs 1,200 g (42 oz) and has a fat content of 48%. The cheese is also available as a mini-truckle weighing 400 g.

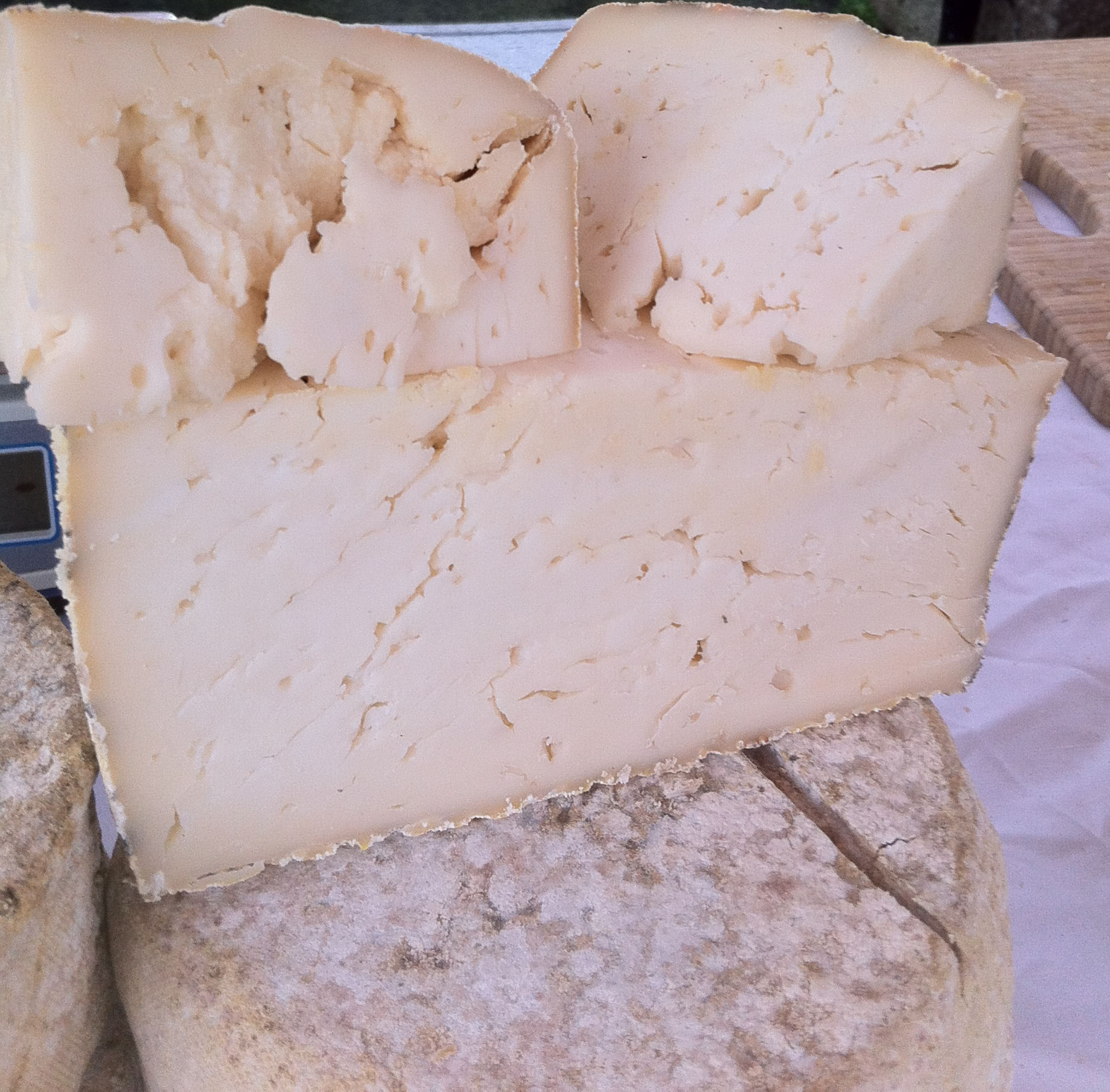
Mature Gubbeen

== Awards ==
Gubbeen cheese has been the recipient of numerous awards, both nationally and internationally. Here is a selection of some recent awards:

- 2011 Silver Medal in the Irish Cheese Awards for semi-soft cheese
- 2010 Gold Medal at the British Cheese Awards for semi-soft cheese
- 2016 Gold Medal at the British Cheese Awards for Rind washed cheese
- 2016 Gold Medal at the British Cheese Awards for Mature smoked Gubbeen

== See also ==
- List of Irish cheeses
- List of smoked foods
