= Jenny Bristow =

British chef

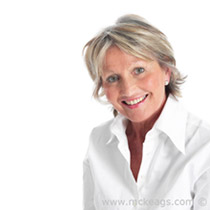
- Born: Jennifer Bristow; Coleraine, County Londonderry, Northern Ireland
- Occupations: Home economics teacher (former); Celebrity chef, Author
- Years active: 1989–present
- Spouse: Bobby Bristow (?–present) 3 children
- Website: jennybristow.com

Jennifer Ann Bristow BEM is a Northern Irish cook and cookery writer. She is best known for her cookery television series produced by UTV.

== Personal life ==
Bristow was brought up on her family's dairy farm near Coleraine. Before her broadcasting career, Bristow worked as a home economics teacher. She has three children.

== Television series ==
Bristow made her first television appearance on Ulster Television's Farming Ulster in 1989 demonstrating how to cook with potatoes, which led a producer at the station to offer Bristow her own series.

- High Days and Holidays
- High Days and Other Days (1992)
- Cookin' in the Kitchen (1995)
- Jenny's Country Cooking (1997–1998, 2 series)
- Cooked in a Flash (1999–2000, 2 series)
- Jenny Bristow Cooks Gloriously Good Food (2001)
- Jenny Bristow Cooks for the Seasons (2002–2003, 2 series)
- Jenny Bristow Light (2003)
- Jenny Bristow: A Taste of Sunshine (2005)
- Jenny Bristow's USA (2007)

All of the above series were produced by UTV, and were filmed in a converted barn at Bristow's farm near Cullybackey. Bristow's series have been transmitted in other ITV regions (Border, Central, Grampian, Granada and LWT, and on television stations in the United States and Australia.

Ratings for Bristow's series have peaked at 215,000 viewers in Northern Ireland.

== Writing career ==
Bristow has so far published twelve cookery books. Books accompanying Bristow's most recent series have been published by Belfast-based publisher Blackstaff Press. Recipes from Bristow's books have appeared in the Belfast Telegraph and Sunday Life newspapers.

== Other work ==
As well as her television and writing work, Bristow takes part in cookery demonstrations and corporate and charitable events. Bristow has taken part in corporate events such as the Balmoral Show and Women on the Move, as well as fundraising events for UNICEF, Macmillan Cancer, the British Heart Foundation and Northern Ireland Hospice Care. Bristow has also been involved in awareness campaigns encouraging people to consume less salt and getting children to practice healthy eating.

In 2007, a Ballymena-based company introduced a biscuit range using recipes created by Bristow.

Bristow was awarded the British Empire Medal (BEM) in the 2014 Birthday Honours for services to broadcasting and the food industry in Northern Ireland.
