= Cooleeney Farmhouse Cheese =

Irish cheese company

Cooleeney Farm
- Country of origin: Ireland
- Region: County Tipperary
- Town: Thurles
- Source of milk: Cows and Goats

Cooleeney Farm produces a number of cheeses from both cow's milk and goat's milk from their premises near Thurles in County Tipperary, Ireland.

The Maher family are fourth generation farmers who use the milk from their own pedigree Friesian dairy herd to make their range of cheeses. All Cooleeney Farm cheeses are made with vegetarian rennet.

== Range ==
Cooleeney Farm produce a range of seven cheeses. Five are made using cow's milk from their own farm, one from goat's milk from their own farm, and one using goat's milk from a nearby source.

Cooleeney Farm Range of Cheese
Name	Milk	Age	Texture
Cooleeney Farmhouse Cheese	Raw cow's milk	8 – 10 weeks	Soft and smooth
Darú	Pasteurised cow's milk	9 months	Semi-hard with small holes
Dunbarra	Pasteurised cow's milk	8 – 10 weeks	Semi-soft
Gleann Óir	Pasteurised goat's milk	9 months	Semi-hard with irregular holes
Gortnamona	Pasteurised goat's milk from a nearby source	8 – 10 weeks	Soft, slightly chalky
Maighean	Raw cow's milk	8 – 10 weeks	Soft and smooth
Tipperary Brie	Pasteurised cow's milk	8 – 10 weeks	Soft and slightly chalky

== Awards ==
- 2011 - Great Taste Awards for soft Cheese, 2 stars for Gortnamona.
- 2010 - World Cheese Awards - Silver medal
- 2010 - Great Taste Awards
- 2010 - Artisan Producer of the Year Award
- 2006 - British Cheese Awards

== See also ==
- List of cheesemakers
