= Mansfieldtown =

Townland in County Louth, Ireland

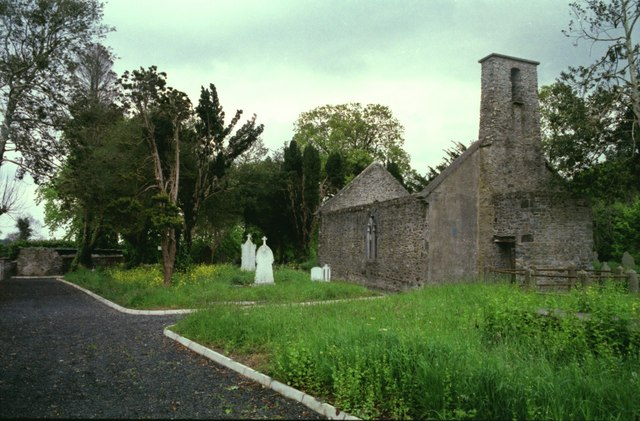
St. Mary's Church, Mansfieldtown, Co. Louth in 1997

Mansfieldtown or Mansfieldstown (Irish: Baile Mhic Mháirtín) is a townland and a former Church of Ireland parish located between Castlebellingham and Tallanstown in County Louth, Ireland. The townland is in a civil parish of the same name.

It was called Mandelvelleston, Mandevilleston and many other names in historical documents. The name is derived from an Anglo-Norman family called Maundeville, which settled there soon after 1172.

After the Rebellion of 1641 Theobald Taaffe, Earl of Carlingford, acquired the greater part of the parish. The Plunkett family of Bawn, the Gernons in Wottonstown and Gilbertstown and the Clintons in Derrycamagh were dispossessed.

The population in 1821 was 1,081; in 1831, 1,062; in 1841, 1,107;in 1851, 652; in 1861, 471; in 1871, 445; in 1881, 395; in 1891, 296; in 1901, 266 (of whom one was a Protestant, the rest Roman Catholics).
