= Burren Gold =

Gouda-style Irish cheese

- Country of origin: Ireland
- Region: County Clare
- Town: Ballyvaughan
- Source of milk: Cow
- Pasteurised: Yes
- Weight: 500g, 4kg,

Burren Gold is a Gouda-style Irish cheese made from pasteurised cows milk. The cheese is made at the Aillwee Cave in Ballyvaughan in County Clare and the rounds are waxed by hand. The cheese is available in a number of flavours: Plain, Cumin, Nettle and Garlic, Black Pepper, Piri Piri, and Smoked.

== Awards ==
In 2009 at the Listowel food fair, Burren Gold won all three awards in the "Best Flavour Added Cheese" category. The Gold was awarded to Black pepper, Silver to Oak smoked, and Bronze to Cumin seed.

== See also ==
- List of cheeses
- List of smoked foods
