= Clonmore Cheese =

Brand of Irish goat cheese

Clonmore
- Country of origin: Ireland
- Region: County Cork
- Town: Charleville
- Source of milk: Goats
- Pasteurised: yes
- Texture: hard
- Weight: 2 kg (4.4 lb) wheel
- Aging time: 3 months minimum, best at 7 months

Clonmore is a hard cheese made from goat's milk, with a waxed rind. It originates from Charleville, County Cork in Ireland and is produced by Tom and Lena Biggane on their farm outside Newtownshandrum since 2001.

It is a gouda style cheese made with vegetarian rennet, covered in a beige waxed rind. Both pasteurised and non-pasteurised (raw milk) versions are available. It has a mild and sweet flavour, which is stronger when aged. It is a seasonal cheese, produced from late March till early November. The goats herd numbers between 70 and 80 of both Saanen and Toggenburg breeds, and are free range.

== Awards ==
Clonmore has won numerous awards, including a gold medal at the National Farmhouse Cheese Competitions in 2003, a silver medal in the same competition in 2005, a gold medal in the British Cheese Awards in 2006, and a bronze medal in 2008.

== See also ==
- List of goat milk cheeses
