= St Tola =

Irish goat cheese company

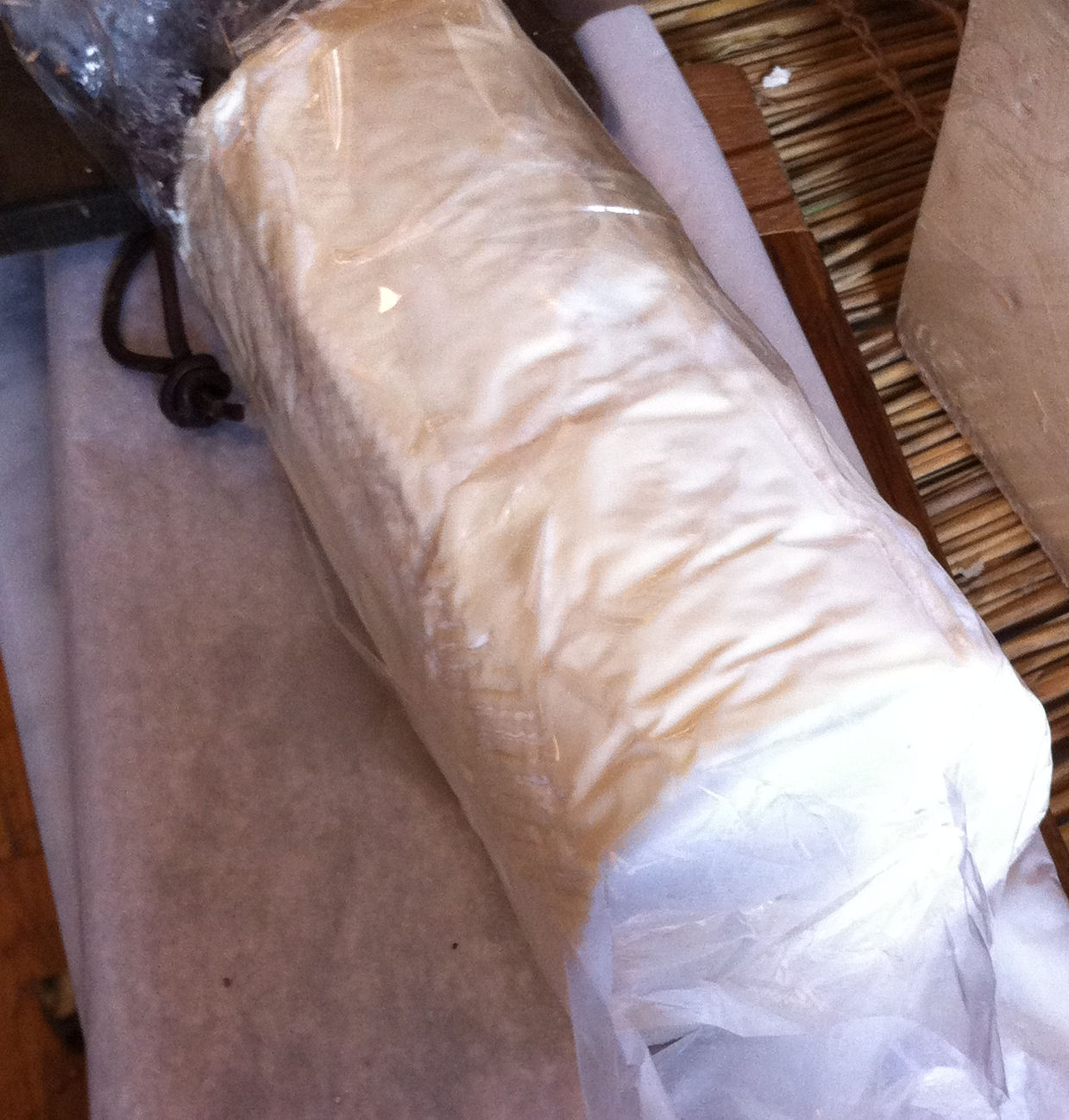
- Country of origin: Ireland
- Region: County Clare
- Town: Inagh
- Source of milk: Goat
- Pasteurised: Both pasteurised and raw milk available
- Texture: Varies
- Weight: Various
- Aging time: Varies

St Tola goats cheese is a range of handmade goat's milk cheese made in Inagh, County Clare. A range of cheese are produced varying from fresh soft cheese to a Gouda style hard cheese.

== History ==
Originally, the business was set up by Meg and Derrick Gordan on their 25-acre farm in the early 1980s, but since 1999 has been made by their neighbour, Siobhán Ni Ghairbhith, on her farm.

== Products ==
St Tola produce a number of goat's milk cheeses:

- St Tola Log Fresh is a fresh cheese available as log
- St Tola Log Mature is a more mature version of the fresh log
- St Tola Crottin are small rounds of fresh goats cheese
- St Tola Divine is a spreadable cream cheese
- St Tola Original is a slice of the mature log
- St Tola Hard Cheese is a gouda style hard goats' cheese.
- St Tola Greek Style is a firm cheese with a mild salty flavour.
- St Tola Ash Matured soft cheese with an ash coating
- St Tola Karst, a 180g ash coated cheese
- St Tola Cranberry soft cheese with cranberry

- British and Irish Cheese Awards 2025
- Gold for St Tola Karst, Silver for St Tola Original Log, Bronze for St Tola Ash log
- Blas na hEirean Awards 2024 - Gold for St Tola Karst
- Irish Made Awards 2024 - Best Irish Cheesemaker
- Great Taste Awards 2024: 2 Star for St Tola Karst. 2 Star for St Tola Ash Log &1 Star for our St Tola Original Log
- Artisan Cheese Awards 2024. Best Goat Cheese for St Tola Ash
- Artisan Cheese Awards 2024 Best Raw Milk Farmhouse Cheese for St Tola Log
- Irish Cheese Awards 2024, Gold - Original Log, Silver for Ash log and Bronze for crottin
- Emerald Award for Burren and Cliffs of Moher Geopark Code of Practice 2024. Scored 97% on code criteria for sustainable practises.
- Local Hero Award - Munster Winner, Restaurant Association of Ireland 2024
- 2 Stars at the Great Taste Awards 2023 for both Ash log & Karst
- Gold at the Great Taste Awards 2022
- Finalist at Blas na hEireann 2022
- Gold at the Irish Cheese Awards 2021 for Log and Divine
- 3 Stars at the Great Taste Awards 2021
- Gold and Silver at the Artisan Cheese Awards 2019
- Best Overall Irish Cheese World Cheese Awards November 2018
- Gold & Silver at Blas na hEireann Oct 2018
- Irish Food Writers’ Guild Environmental Award 2018
- Eurotoque Irish Food Producer Award 2015
- Best Artisan Producer Blas nah Eireann October 2014
- Premio Roma 1st in Class 2014
- Supreme Champion Irish Cheese Awards June 2013

== See also ==
- List of goat milk cheeses
