= Corleggy Cheese =

Irish cheese company

Corleggy Cheeses
- Country of origin: Ireland
- Region: County Cavan
- Town: Belturbet
- Source of milk: Sheep, cow, and goat
- Pasteurised: No
- Texture: Vares
- Weight: Varies
- Aging time: Best at 12 weeks or older

Corleggy Cheeses is an Irish cheese producer in County Cavan. It was started by Silke Cropp in 1985 using milk from her own goat herd. Today Corleggy make a variety of different cheese from goat's milk, sheep's milk and cow's milk sourced from local farmers.

== Varieties ==
Corleggy make two varieties of goat's cheese, one variety of sheep's cheese and five varieties of cow's cheese marketed under the "Drumlin" brand. The herds graze on neighbouring farms on drumlin pastures along the River Erne. The goat's cheese is made from pasteurised milk while the range of cow's cheese is made with raw milk. Vegetarian rennet is used, and for some varieties seawater is used to wash the cheese in salt water and helps form the edible rind.

=== Corleggy ===
Corleggy is a hard cheese handmade from raw goat's milk. Every individual cheese is matured from eight weeks to four months, depending on the season, weather, and humidity, and the seasonality of the grass and herbs available to the goats at the time of making the cheese. The rind of Corleggy is natural, formed by bathing the cheeses in sea salt brine. On occasion, a smoked version of Corleggy is available.

=== Quivvy ===
This is a soft goat's cheese preserved in Greek kalamata olive oil along with sun-dried tomatoes. It is only available from April to October.

=== Creeny ===
Creeny is a hard cheese handmade from raw sheep's milk. On occasion, a smoked version of Creeny is available.

=== Drumlin ===
Drumlin cheese is a hard cheese made from raw cow's milk and matured for a minimum of six weeks. Young cheeses have a mild taste, getting stronger as the cheese matures. The rind is edible.

- Drumlin Traditional - This is the traditional unflavoured variety of Drumlin.
- Drumlin Garlic and Red Pepper - This cheese is flavoured with garlic and red pepper.
- Drumlin Cumin Seed - This cheese is flavoured with whole cumin seeds.
- Drumlin Smoked - This cheese is smoked with beechwood.
- Drumlin Peppercorn - This cheese is flavoured with whole green peppercorns.

== Awards ==
- 2016 - Super Gold award at the World Cheese Awards for "Best Irish Cheese"
- 2011 - Gold star award at the Great Taste Awards for Creeny, two Gold star award for Corleggy hard goats' milk cheese and Gold star award for Corleggy Kid
- 2010 - Silver medal at the World Cheese Awards for Creeny, in the Hard ewes' milk cheese plain category
- 2007 - gold medal at the British Cheese Awards for Creeny

== See also ==
- List of cheeses
- List of goat milk cheeses – Cultured products of milk of domestic goats
- List of Irish cheeses
- List of smoked foods
