= Ardagh Castle Cheese =

Irish cheese company

- Country of origin: Ireland
- Region: County Cork
- Town: Baltimore
- Source of milk: Goats
- Pasteurised: No

Ardagh Castle is an Irish cheese producer owned by Gwynfor Owen and Christine Owen. It is located on their farm at Baltimore, County Cork. Founded by Judy Wotton, the current owners acquired Ardagh Castle in 2014 and have continued to make cheese in the same way. Three types of cheese are made. All are farmhouse cheeses, handmade using raw milk sourced from their small herd of Anglo-Nubian goats. Production of the cheese is very small and it is sold at Skibbereen farmers market.

== Products ==
- Ardagh Castle Goats Cheese - suitable for vegetarians, aged from 8 weeks to 6 months.
- Ardagh Castle Gjetost - made from whey, to order.
- Ardagh Castle Ricotta - made from whey, to order.

== Awards ==
- Bronze medal in the 2011 British Cheese awards for Goats cheese aged over 3 months.

== See also ==
- List of goat milk cheeses
