= Wicklow Farmhouse Cheese =

- Country of origin: Ireland
- Region: County Wicklow
- Town: Arklow
- Source of milk: Cow
- Pasteurised: Pasteurised
- Texture: Varies
- Weight: Various
- Aging time: Varies

Wicklow Farmhouse Cheese is a range of handmade cow's milk cheese made in Arklow, County Wicklow ranging from Brie cheeses to Cheddar cheese. A range of cheese are produced varying from fresh soft cheese to a Gouda style hard cheese.

== History ==
Wicklow Farmhouse Cheese was set up in 2005 by John Hempenstall as a way of supplementing farm income. The cheese is made exclusively from the milk of the Hempenstall's Friesian cows and each cheese is handmade on the farm.

== Products ==
Wicklow Farmhouse Cheese produce a number of cow's milk cheeses:

- Wicklow Blue is a blue veined brie cheese using pasteurised cows milk and vegetarian rennet.
- Wicklow Bán is a brie cheese
- Wicklow Gold is a cheddar cheese made using pasteurised cows milk. Several flavoured varieties are also produced such as "Nettle and Chive" and "Basil and Garlic".
- St. Kevins Brie is produced for the catering industry

== Awards ==
Wicklow Farmhouse Cheese has won numerous awards.

- 2013 Global Cheese Awards awarded medals in different categories including a gold medal for Wicklow Bán, a silver medal for Wicklow Blue and a bronze medal for Wicklow Blue.
- 2014 Nantwich Cheese Show awarded the trophy for best vegetarian cheese to Wicklow Blue
