= Coolea Cheese =

Irish cheese

Coolea
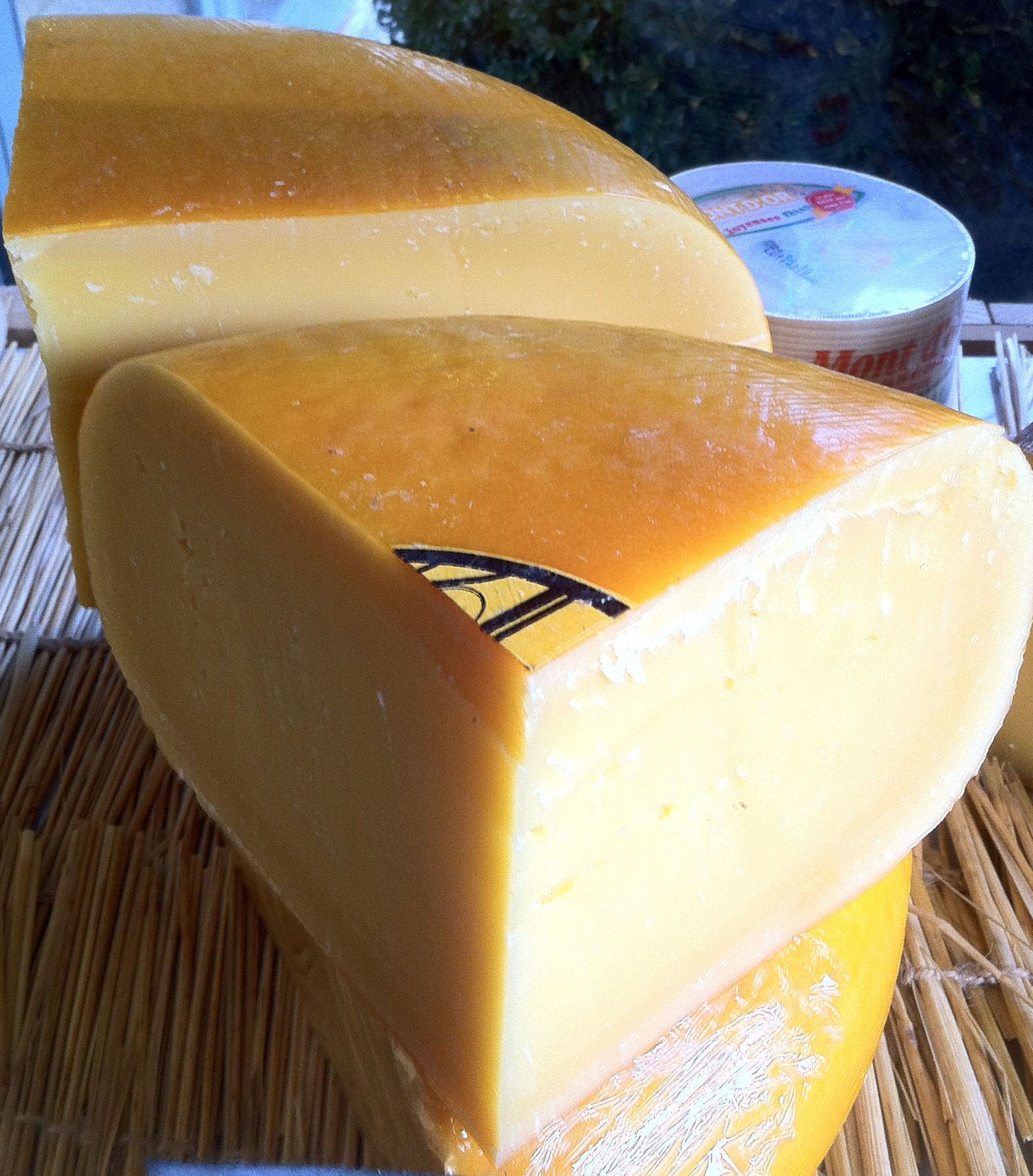
- Country of origin: Ireland
- Region: West Cork
- Town: Coolea
- Source of milk: cows
- Pasteurised: Yes
- Texture: Hard
- Fat content: 45%
- Weight: 900 g (32 oz), 5.5 kg (12 lb) and 9 kg (20 lb)
- Aging time: Six to twelve months

Coolea is a type of cow's milk cheese that consists of a smooth, Gouda-like texture with rich, sweet, caramelly flavours. Like Gouda, Coolea cheese is covered in a thick, solid wax rind which contributes to the cheese's flavour and texture.

Since the late 1970s, Coolea has been made from an old Dutch Gouda recipe by the Willems family in the Coolea area of County Cork in Ireland. It has won a number of awards both nationally and internationally.
