= Blue Rathgore =

Brand of Irish goat cheese

- Country of origin: Northern Ireland
- Region: County Antrim
- Source of milk: Goats
- Pasteurised: No
- Aging time: Three to six months

Blue Rathgore was a blue Irish cheese made from goat's milk. It was produced from 1989 until at least 2000 by the Woodside Dairy in Finaghy, Belfast, Northern Ireland.

Blue Rathgore cheese had a spicy flavour with a crumbly and moist texture.

== See also ==
- List of goat milk cheeses
- List of Irish cheeses
- List of British cheeses
