= Bluebell Falls =

Irish goat cheese company

- Country of origin: Ireland
- Region: County Cork
- Town: Charleville
- Source of milk: Goat
- Pasteurised: No (heat treated)
- Texture: Semi-soft
- Weight: 170g to 500g

Bluebell Falls is an organic goat cheese company in County Cork, Ireland.

== History ==
Bluebell Falls farm is owned by the O'Sullivan family and registered and approved as a Food Business operator. Before 1995, the farm was primarily geared towards the traditional Irish herds of cattle and sheep but at that time, started to develop new products from goat's milk. By 2008, they had a herd of 130 goats being milked. By 2011, the decision was made to switch totally to producing goats milk and cheese. The farm is located at Charleville, County Cork overlooking the Ballyhoura mountains.

== Products ==
Bluebell Falls farm produces a number of goat milk cheeses from their herds of Saanen and Tangenberg goats. Their cheese is sold fresh when 24 hours old, and is made in the style of French chevre.

- Cygnus is the main cheese product produced at the farm. It is a fresh goats cheese with a smooth texture.
- Cygnus Honey was created in 2008. It is created by the addition of garlic, honey, and thyme to the plain goats cheese.
- Cygnus Pepper was also created in 2008 by the addition of garlic, herbs, and black pepper to plain goats cheese.
- Delphinus was created in 2010 and is a white mould soft goats cheese with a buttery texture and slight mushroom taste
- Orion was created in 2010 and is a semi-hard goats cheese.
- Pegasus was created in 2008 and is a white mould soft goats cheese with a soft texture and fresh grassy taste.

== See also ==
- List of goat milk cheeses
