= Ardrahan Farmhouse Cheese =

Two varieties of cheese made in Ireland

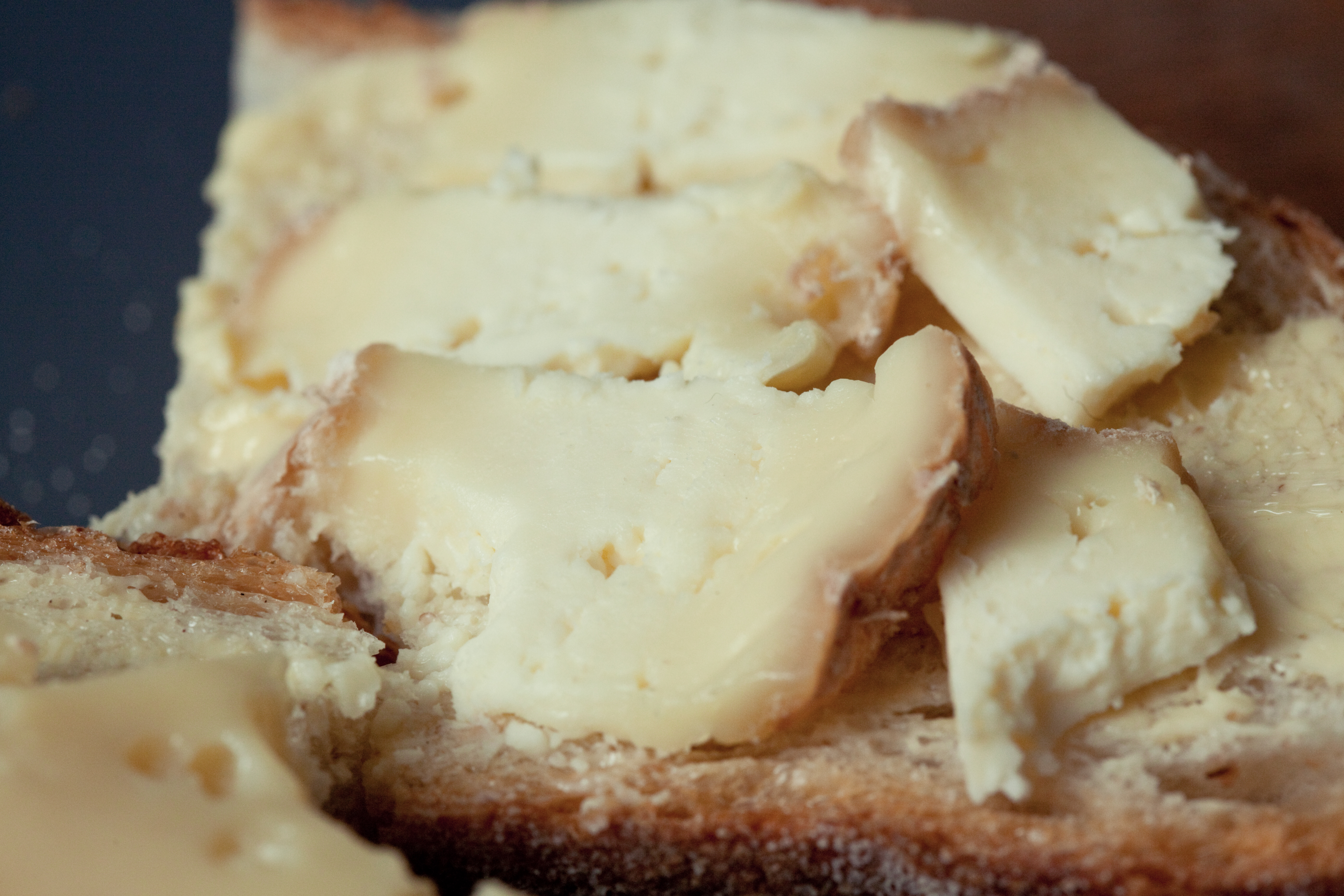
- Country of origin: Ireland
- Region: County Cork
- Town: Kanturk
- Source of milk: Cows
- Pasteurised: Yes
- Fat content: 25%
- Weight: 400g and 1.5 kg (3.3 lb) wheel
- Aging time: Four to eight weeks

Ardrahan Farmhouse Cheese creates two varieties of cheese. They originate from Ardrahan Farmhouse, Kanturk, County Cork in Ireland. The two varieties are Ardrahan and Duhallow. Eugene and Mary Burns first made Ardrahan cheese on their farm in County Cork in 1983 using traditional techniques. Both varieties are made entirely from the milk of the Burnses' cow herd, which is composed of Friesian cows.

== Description ==
Ardrahan is a semi-soft vegetarian cheese made from pasteurised cow's milk and vegetarian rennet. It has a 25% fat content. It is made into wheels of 400g and 1.5 kg with a ridged brine-washed rind encrusted with moulds. A smoked version is also available.

Ardrahan cheese has an earthy, farmhouse taste and aroma, and also a zesty tang that enhances the rich buttery and meaty flavour. It has a smooth texture, a deep yellow interior and an edible, full-bodied rind. Ardrahan's interior is firm and slightly chalky. It matures in four to eight weeks.

== History ==
Since 2006, they have also produced Duhallow cheese, a medium hard cheese also made from pasteurised cow's milk using vegetarian rennet. Most is exported to the US.

== Awards ==
In 1994, Ardrahan won the Irish Food Writers Guild annual Good Food award. Since then, Ardrahan has won many more awards, including multiple medals from the British Cheese Awards and the World Cheese Awards.
