= Fivemiletown Creamery =

Fivemiletown Creamery is based in Fivemiletown, County Tyrone, Northern Ireland, and is a producer of handmade speciality soft cheeses and cheddars The company is a farmers' co-operative, and employs around 40 people. The creamery draws its milk supplies mostly from over 60 dairy farmers from across Northern Ireland. The company was founded in 1898 and added cheese production in 1972. Fivemiletown Creamery is the only speciality cheese maker in Northern Ireland. In 2014 Fivemiletown Creamery was acquired by Dale Farm.

== Products ==
The award-winning range consists of:

- Ballybrie - an Irish brie
- Ballyoak - the first smoked Brie in Europe
- Ballyblue - reputed to be the first blue cheese to be developed in Ireland.
- Boilie - a range of soft cheeses formed into small balls, and marinated in sunflower oil flavoured with herbs and garlic. Comes in both a goats and a cows variety
- Oakwood - smoked cheddar using wood chips from sustainably foraged local oak logs
- O'Reilly's - goat's cheese natural, goat's cheese hand rolled in chives, goat's cheese in mustard seed
- Fivemiletown Cheddar - a range of cheddar cheese ranging from mild to extra mature
- Housewife's Choice - award-winning salted butter. The first award for Housewife's Choice dates back to 1919.

=== Boilie Cheese ===
Boilie
- Country of origin: Ireland
- Region: County Cavan
- Town: Virginia, County Cavan
- Source of milk: Cow or Goat
- Pasteurised: Yes
- Weight: 150 g (5.3 oz), 200 g (7.1 oz), 1 kg (2.2 lb)

Boilie cheese is a soft cream cheese formed into small balls, and marinated in sunflower oil flavoured with herbs and garlic. The cheese was first produced at Ryefield Farm located beside Lough Ramor near Virginia, County Cavan. In 2007, Fivemiltown Creamery acquired Ryefield Farm and continues to produce the cheese at the Fivemiletown base under the Boilie label. There are two varieties, Boilie Irish Cheese Pearls made from cow's milk and Boilie Irish Goat's Cheese made from goat's milk. Both cheeses are made using the same techniques.

In 1973, John and Anne Brodie purchased 85 acres (340,000 m^{2}) of farmland and started with just two cows. In 1984, Anne began by producing a Cheddar cheese and sold it at a market stall in Dublin and some select shops including the supermarket chain Superquinn. In 1992, Anne introduced fresh soft cheese, handrolled into small balls and marinated in sunflower oil, through the Superquinn chain. Initially, no brand name was associated with the product, but eventually it was decided to name the product after a road near their farm called Boilie Road. Later the name "Boilie" was discovered to mean "milking place". In 2007, Ryefield Farm was acquired by Fivemiletown Creamery.

== Awards ==
In 2011 Fivemiletown Creamery won 23 awards for their high quality dairy products, as well as an award for Northern Ireland Environmental Project of the Year 2011, at the UTV & Business Eye magazine awards.

In early 2010, Fivemiletown was awarded the International ISO 14001 Environmental Standard, one of only a small number of Northern Ireland companies to have achieved the standard by implementing an environmental management system to reduce the environmental carbon footprint of the business and to decrease pollution and waste produced.

Fivemiletown also achieved a British Retail Consortium Accreditation of Grade A. The company are the first food business in Northern Ireland to achieve the Red Tractor, Assured Dairy Farm quality mark, following an extensive and independent audit of its milk suppliers.

Their cheeses have won awards at the Great Taste Awards, British Cheese Awards and the Nantwich International Cheese Awards. In November 2010, Fivemiletown was named as Best Small Supplier 2010 by Sainsbury's for supply of speciality cheeses.
