= Durrus Farmhouse Cheese =

Brand of Irish cheese

Coordinates: 51.64590°N 9.527728°W

Durrus Cheese
- Country of origin: Ireland
- Region: County Cork
- Town: Durrus
- Source of milk: Cows
- Texture: Semi-Soft
- Aging time: Three to five weeks

Durrus is a washed rind cow's milk cheese from Ireland. It was developed by Jeffa Gill in 1979, and is made by traditional methods. Durrus is produced in the valley of Coomkeen, near the village of Durrus on the Sheep's Head Peninsula in County Cork Ireland, where local herds provide the raw milk needed to make it.

Durrus is a round, semi-soft cheese. It has a pale interior with a pinkish, yellow-grey rind. It is aged for 3 to 5 weeks to allow the flavour to mature. It has a mild and creamy taste that becomes stronger and fruitier as it ages. The odour is mild to strong, depending on age. Durrus should be served at room temperature, and is best with fruit (such as a pear), on toast, and in fondue.

== Awards ==
Durrus has won many awards at competitions such as the IFEX International Cheese Awards, the World Cheese Awards, and the British Cheese Awards. Some other awards are:

- 2011 Gold star award at the Great Taste Awards.
