= Coleraine Cheddar =

Brand of Irish cheese

Cheddar
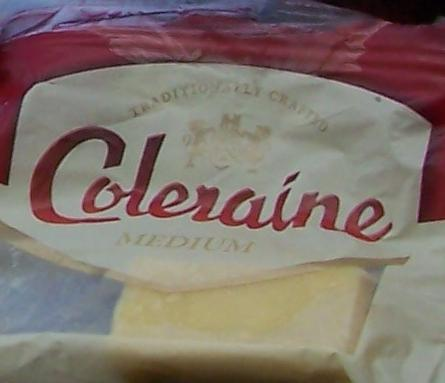
- Country of origin: Northern Ireland
- Region, town: Coleraine, County Londonderry
- Source of milk: Cows
- Pasteurised: Yes
- Texture: hard
- Aging time: 3-4 months depending on variety
- Certification: ?

Coleraine Cheddar is a brand of cheese which originated in Northern Ireland.

== History ==
The product range was originally manufactured at a factory which was built in 1948 in Coleraine, County Londonderry for the manufacture of roller and spray dried powders, sterilised cream, butter and other products, and in 1951, the plant was expanded to begin production of about 5 tonnes of cheddar cheese a day from about 13,000 gallons of full cream milk. By the early 1960s the factory was taken over by Fisons.

Coleraine Cheddar continues to be distributed under the name of Dairy Produce Packers Ltd of Coleraine, part of the Kerry Group, but the cheeses are mostly made in a factory in Portadown, County Armagh. The Coleraine factory makes only processed cheese slices for the supermarket/fast food industries. The Portadown company makes Coleraine Cheddar, Coleraine Mature White Cheddar, Coleraine Medium Cheddar, Coleraine Mild White Cheddar and Royal Canadian Mature Cheddar.

== See also ==
- List of British cheeses
