= Brown cow =

Brown cow may refer to:

- a cow that is brown
- Braunvieh ('brown cow'), a group of breeds of cattle originating in Switzerland
- Brown Cow (yogurt), an American brand of yogurt
- Root beer float, a chilled beverage

== See also ==
- List of cattle breeds
- "How now brown cow", a speaking exercise
- Scammonden Bridge, or Brown Cow Bridge, in Kirklees, West Yorkshire, England
