= Danone North America =

American food and beverage company

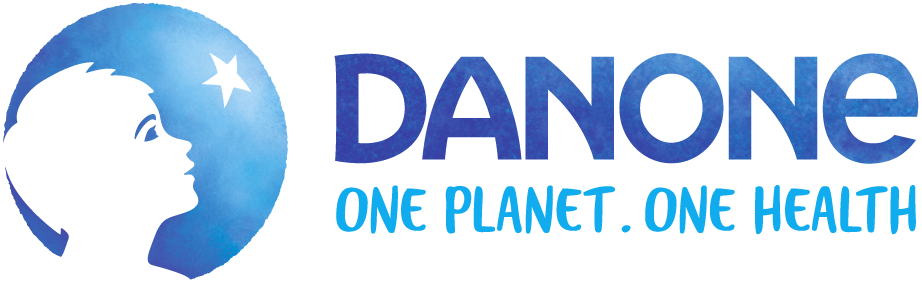
- Formerly: WhiteWave Foods (1977–2017); DanoneWave (2017–2018)
- Type: Subsidiary
- Industry: Food
- Founded: 1977; 49 years ago in Boulder, Colorado
- Founder: Steve Demos
- Fate: As WhiteWave Foods: Acquired by Dean Foods in 2002, then in 2016 by Danone
- Headquarters: Broomfield, Colorado, U.S.
- Area served: North America and Europe
- Brands: Silk; International Delight
- Number of employees: 3,800
- Parent: Danone (2017–present); Dean Foods (2002–2013)
- Subsidiaries: Alpro; Horizon Organic
- Website: danonenorthamerica.com

Danone North America is a consumer packaged food and beverage company based in White Plains, New York, U.S., that manufactures, markets, distributes, and sells branded premium dairy products, plant-based foods and beverages, coffee creamers, and organic produce throughout North America and Europe.

WhiteWave was purchased by French conglomerate Danone in 2017 for $12.5 billion, and was then renamed to "DanoneWave".

== History ==
The company was established as "WhiteWave Foods" in 1977 by Steve Demos in Boulder, Colorado, to expand soy into the market.

The company was formerly a subsidiary of Dean Foods, and was spun off in an initial public offering announced in August 2012. Dean Foods had acquired WhiteWave in May 2002.

WhiteWave acquired Earthbound Farm, America's largest grower of organic produce, on January 2, 2014, for about $600 million.

In September 2014, WhiteWave announced they were taking over vegan dessert and beverage company, So Delicious. WhiteWave announced on October 31, 2014, that the So Delicious takeover was complete.

On July 7, 2016, French food and beverage manufacturer Danone announced a $12.5 billion deal to acquire WhiteWave. On August 15, WhiteWave announced a meeting had been scheduled for October 4 for stockholders to vote on the Danone takeover. The WhiteWave board unanimously recommend that the takeover bid be accepted. On March 31, 2017, Danone announced it had reached an agreement with the US Department of Justice concerning its WhiteWave transaction for $12.5 billion, wherein Danone sold its "Stonyfield dairy subsidiary in the months after the WhiteWave acquisition closes." The acquisition was completed in April 2017 and newly formed company was named "DanoneWave" and in April 2018 it was renamed "Danone North America". It now operates as a subsidiary and the US headquarters remains in Denver.

== Brands ==
The company’s brands distributed in North America include Horizon Organic dairy and pantry products, Silk plant-based foods and beverages, Left Field Farms creamer and milk, Stok cold-brew coffee, So Delicious Dairy Free ice cream, Too Good, and International Delight and Land O'Lakes coffee creamers and beverages. WhiteWave’s European brands of plant-based foods and beverages include Alpro and Provamel.

== See also ==
- List of food companies
