= Stonyfield Farm =

American dairy company

Stonyfield Farm, Inc.
- Type: Subsidiary
- Industry: Dairy
- Founded: 1983; 43 years ago
- Founder: Samuel Kaymen, Louise Kaymen
- Headquarters: Londonderry, New Hampshire, United States
- Products: Yogurt, frozen yogurt, milk, cream, smoothies
- Parent: Danone (2001–17); Lactalis (2017–present)
- Website: www.stonyfield.com

Stonyfield Farm, Inc., also simply called Stonyfield, is an organic yogurt maker and dairy company located in Londonderry, New Hampshire, United States. Stonyfield Farm was founded by Samuel Kaymen in 1983, on a 19th-century farmstead in Wilton, New Hampshire, as an organic farming school. The company makes the second leading brand of organic yogurt in North America, with 13.3% of the market.

The company is owned by the largest dairy company in the world, the French group Lactalis.

== History ==
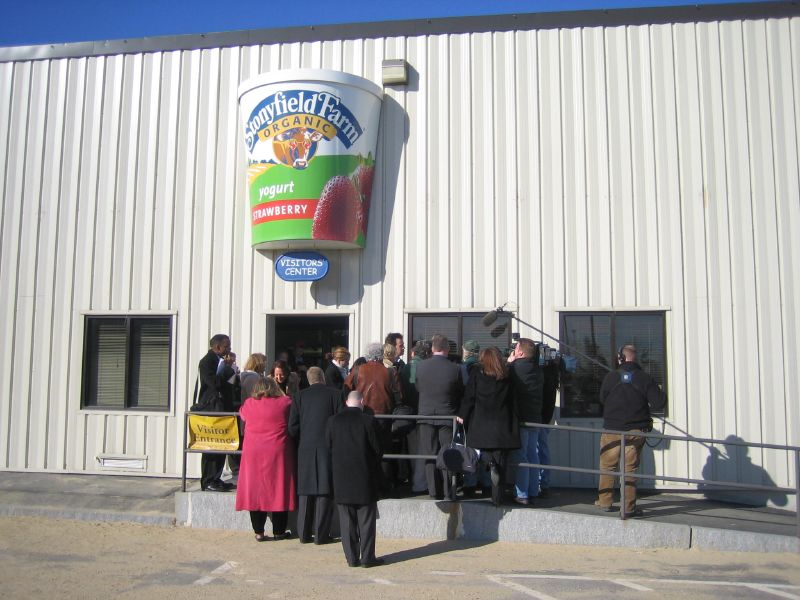
Stonyfield Farm

In 2001, Groupe Danone, a French food product company whose brands include Evian bottled water and Danone/Dannon yogurt, purchased an initial 40% of Stonyfield shares. This was followed with additional purchases such that Group Danone owned the entire company by 2014.

Gary Hirshberg is chairman and former president and CEO of Stonyfield Farm. Through its Profits for the Planet program, Stonyfield gives 10% of profits to environmental causes. Its milk comes from New England and Midwest dairy farmers through the CROPP (Organic Valley) cooperative.

In 2003, Stonyfield Farm acquired Brown Cow.

In 2006, Stonyfield entered the French market with its Les 2 Vaches (The Two Cows) brand. It also expanded to Canada, with yogurt produced in Quebec. In June 2007, Stonyfield Farm launched its first brand in the UK, Stony, Yogurt on a Mission, though the line has since been discontinued. An organic yogurt brand named Glenisk, however, was successfully launched in Ireland.

On March 31, 2017, Groupe Danone announced its intention to sell the Stonyfield subsidiary to avoid antitrust claims and to clear the way for the acquisition of more significant U.S. organic food producer WhiteWave Foods. In July 2017 it was announced that Danone had agreed to sell Stonyfield to Lactalis for $875 million. The sale was completed and Stonyfield is now entirely owned by a second French dairy giant.

== Legal issues and controversies ==
Emails leaked by WikiLeaks revealed that Stonyfield chairman Gary Hirshberg lobbied John Podesta, the chairman of Hillary Clinton's presidential campaign, to have Hillary Clinton deliver a strong message in support of mandatory labeling of genetically modified food. As part of the communication, Hirshberg noted that he raised $400,000 for the Clinton campaign.

In response to pressure from regulators to decrease the amount of added sugar in its products, Stonyfield Farm announced a plan to reduce added sugars by 25% in its yogurt line in 2017.

In January 2018, Stonyfield launched an anti-GMO campaign featuring children reading scripted messages of questionable validity. In response to criticism of this ad on their Facebook page, Stonyfield deleted comments, blocked responders, and labeled critics as "trolls" who had violated the company's terms of use.

In May 2026, the Genetic Literacy Project published an article criticizing Stonyfield's marketing of organic yogurt. The article alleged that the company's statements about pesticides, organic production, and children's health could mislead consumers about the relative safety of organic and conventional food. The Cornucopia Institute subsequently included Stonyfield Farms in its Organic Dairy Scorecard, noting that Stonyfield Organic did not participate in its investigation.
