= PissedConsumer =

American online review platform

PissedConsumer.com
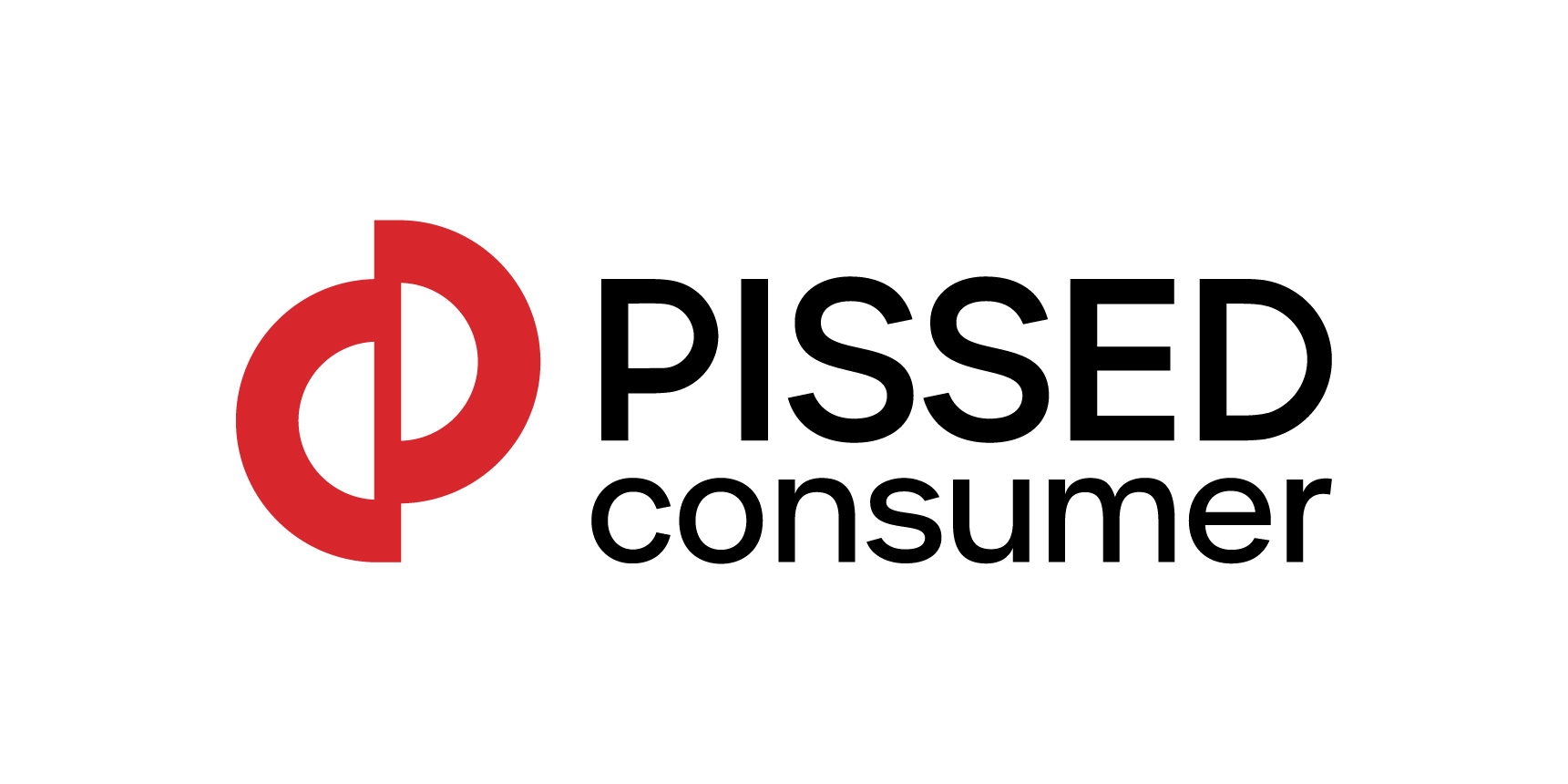
- Type: Privately held company
- Industry: Consumer review service (online)
- Founded: 2006
- Founder: Michael Podolsky
- Headquarters: Las Vegas, Nevada, United States
- Area served: Worldwide
- Products: PissedConsumer.com, PissedConsumer Club
- Services: Online reviews, reputation management, consumer insights

PissedConsumer.com is an American consumer advocacy and resolution platform operated by Consumer Opinion LLC. The site hosts consumer-submitted online reviews and complaints about companies and products, and offers tools for consumers to resolve issues and for businesses to analyze and address customer concerns effectively.

== History ==
PissedConsumer.com was founded in 2006 by Michael Podolsky to expose problematic business practices. In March 2016, the site publicly disclosed and helped uncover a scheme involving certain reputation-management companies. In the fall of 2016 the company pursued litigation and advocacy related to consumer speech and unfair reputation-management practices, attracting regulatory and media attention. In 2020 PissedConsumer publicly weighed in on debates over Section 230 of the Communications Decency Act, defending protections for websites that host user-generated content.

== Social responsibility ==
In 2016, the company published investigative material alleging misuse of litigation by certain reputation-management firms. The company subsequently brought litigation connected to those allegations and the episode drew broader media and legal attention to questionable reputation-management schemes.

In 2023, PissedConsumer.com and founder Michael Podolsky launched the Ukraine Support Project, a public campaign and online resource aimed at informing Ukrainian and American consumers about companies that continued to operate in Russia and (according to the project) contribute tax revenue there. The project publishes lists, reports and a consumer guide to companies' activity in Russia to help people identify firms operating in the Russian market and to encourage consumer action, including targeted boycotts. Also in 2023 and 2025, PissedConsumer appeared on the Inc. 5000 list of fastest-growing private companies. In 2024, the company launched the annual Consumers Choice Award to recognize companies for customer-service performance, and it was named among America's fastest-growing companies in lists compiled by the Financial Times and Statista.

In 2026, the platform expanded beyond a traditional review website by introducing features intended to facilitate dispute resolution between consumers and businesses. These included an AI-powered Call Assistant designed to guide consumers through the complaint process, as well as tools for submitting collective complaints, the PissedConsumer Club, and other consumer support features.
