= Adam Wonus =

Orlando real estate developer

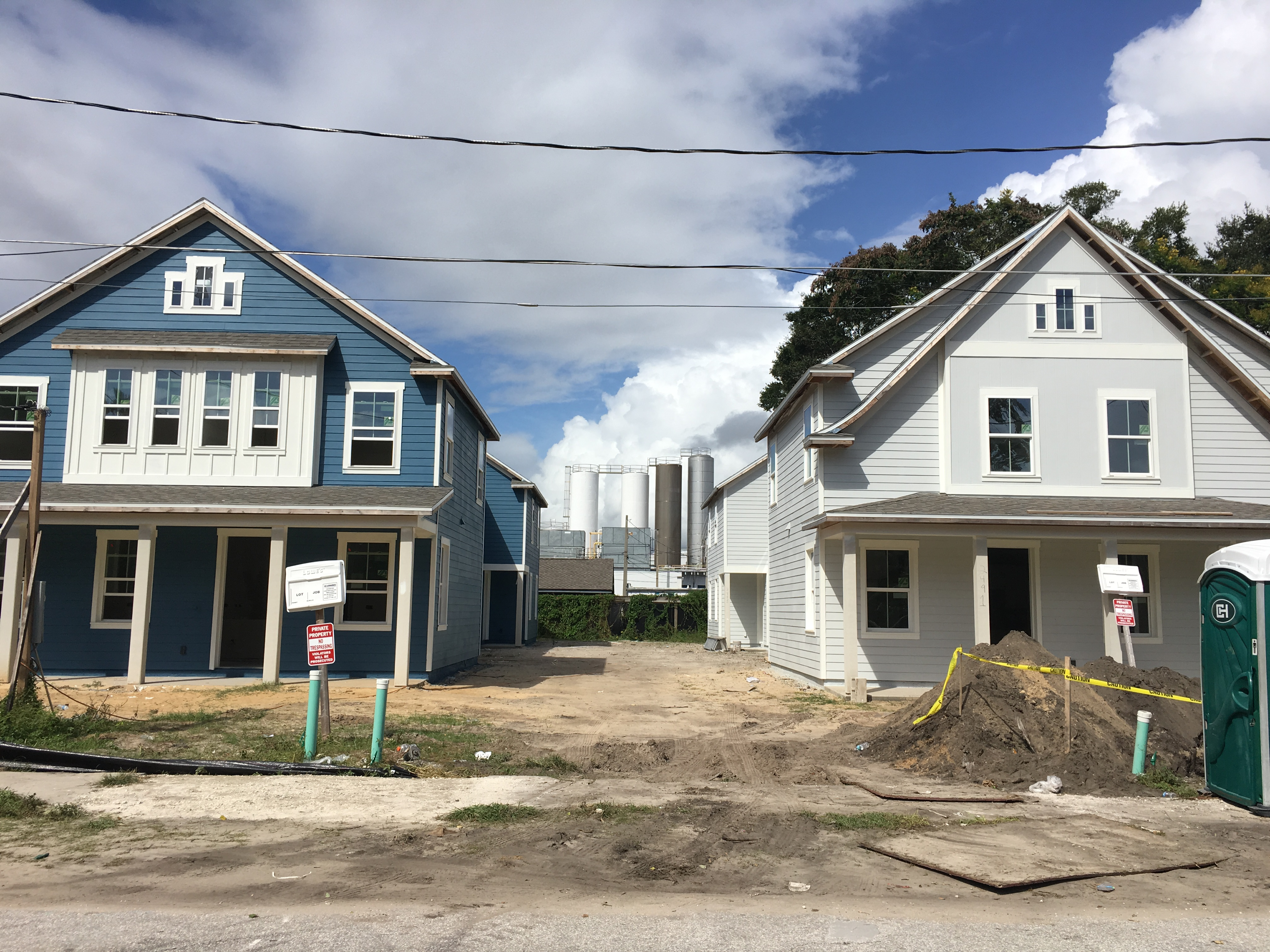
An example Adam Wonus development project (front to back duplex model)

Adam Wonus was born in Ohio and now resides in Orlando, Florida. He graduated from Ohio University. He is a real estate developer and is known for his redevelopment of the Milk District in Orlando, Florida. He is the largest landlord in the Milk District, the eastern central district just north of downtown Orlando. The Milk District is famous for the T.G. Lee Milk plant that was established in 1925. According to the Orlando Sentinel, he has built over 60 townhouse units in the downtown Orlando area. He has been interviewed on Fox News Orlando, The Orlando Sentinel as well as NPR.

== Career ==
Adam began his career in banking, having formerly worked with Wells Fargo Bank and CBRE Capital Markets. During this time he was focused on financing commercial real estate as well as structured and financed business acquisitions for businesses all over the nation. His efforts earned him state-wide and national recognition for loan volume.

He also developed a passion for franchised concepts and in 2008 Adam purchased his first franchise. He quickly grew a niche, membership-model barbershop concept to several locations and increased revenues enough to provide a profitable exit strategy for his investors within four years.

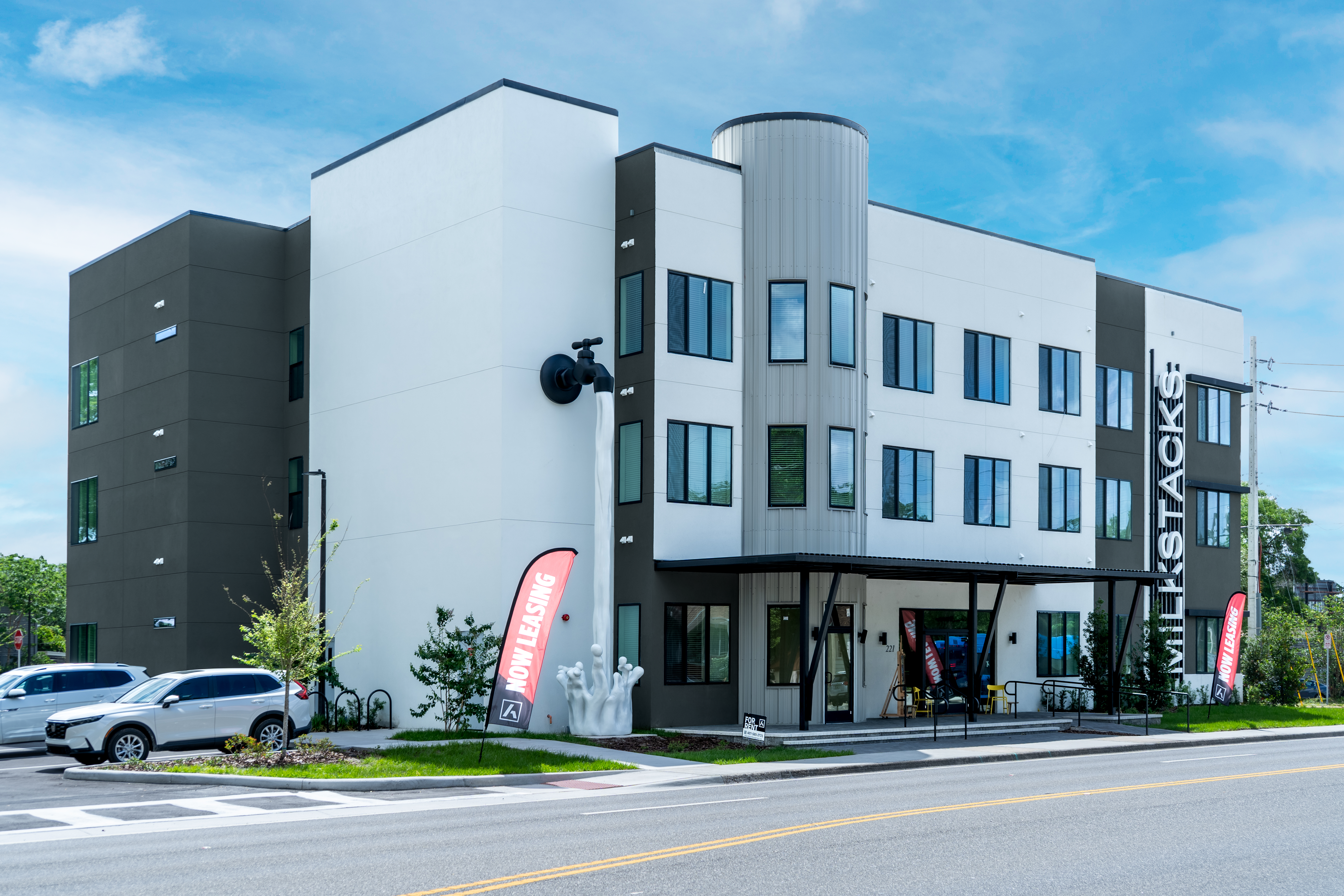
The Milk Stacks Mixed-Use Development made by Adam Wonus and the atrium Development team. (Photo by Troy Morrissey)

On October 31, 2014, Adam with his business partner Michael Krause purchased Atrium Management Company, in which he saw near limitless potential. Atrium currently manages over 5 million square feet of property across three states and has a growing development pipeline set to deliver millions of square feet of multifamily and commercial space. One of such developments is the Milk Stacks which is located in Orlando's Milk District, the success and scope of this project earned Adam and his team at Atrium Development Group two awards "NAIOP's Developer of the Year" and "NAIOP's Development of the Year" The company has received "Best Places to Work" honors from the Orlando Business Journal multiple consecutive years, and Adam has received its "Community Impact Award" in addition to being named to "Orlando's 40 Under 40" and "The Most Influential Leaders in Central Florida" Lists.
