= Earthbound Farm =

Farm company in California, US

Coordinates: 36°52′29″N 121°33′13″W

- Type: Subsidiary
- Industry: Food
- Founded: 1984; 42 years ago
- Founders: Drew and Myra Goodman
- Headquarters: San Juan Bautista, CA, U.S.
- Products: Organic food
- Parent: Taylor Farms (2019–pres.); Danone
- Website: earthboundfarm.com

Earthbound Farm is an American farm located near San Juan Bautista, California. It is the largest producer of organic salads in the United States. It was also the first company to produce prewashed, packaged salad greens on an industrial scale.

== History ==
Earthbound Farm was founded in 1984 by Drew and Myra Goodman, on a 2.5 acres (10,000 m^{2}) farm in California’s Carmel Valley. Just over two decades later, the company employed over 150 growers on 30,000 acres. By 2015, nearly 50,000 acres were in production. In The Omnivore's Dilemma, Michael Pollan referred to Earthbound Farm as "a company that arguably represents industrial organic farming at its best."

In 2009, HM Capital acquired Earthbound Farm. In 2013, Earthbound Farm was acquired by WhiteWave Foods, owner of Horizon Organic milk, for $600 million. In July 2016, it was announced that the French company Danone would purchase WhiteWave Foods for $10.4 billion. The acquisition was completed in April 2017, and the newly formed company was named "DanoneWave". Finally, Earthbound Farm was acquired in April 2019 by Taylor Farms.
