= Generation Kindle =

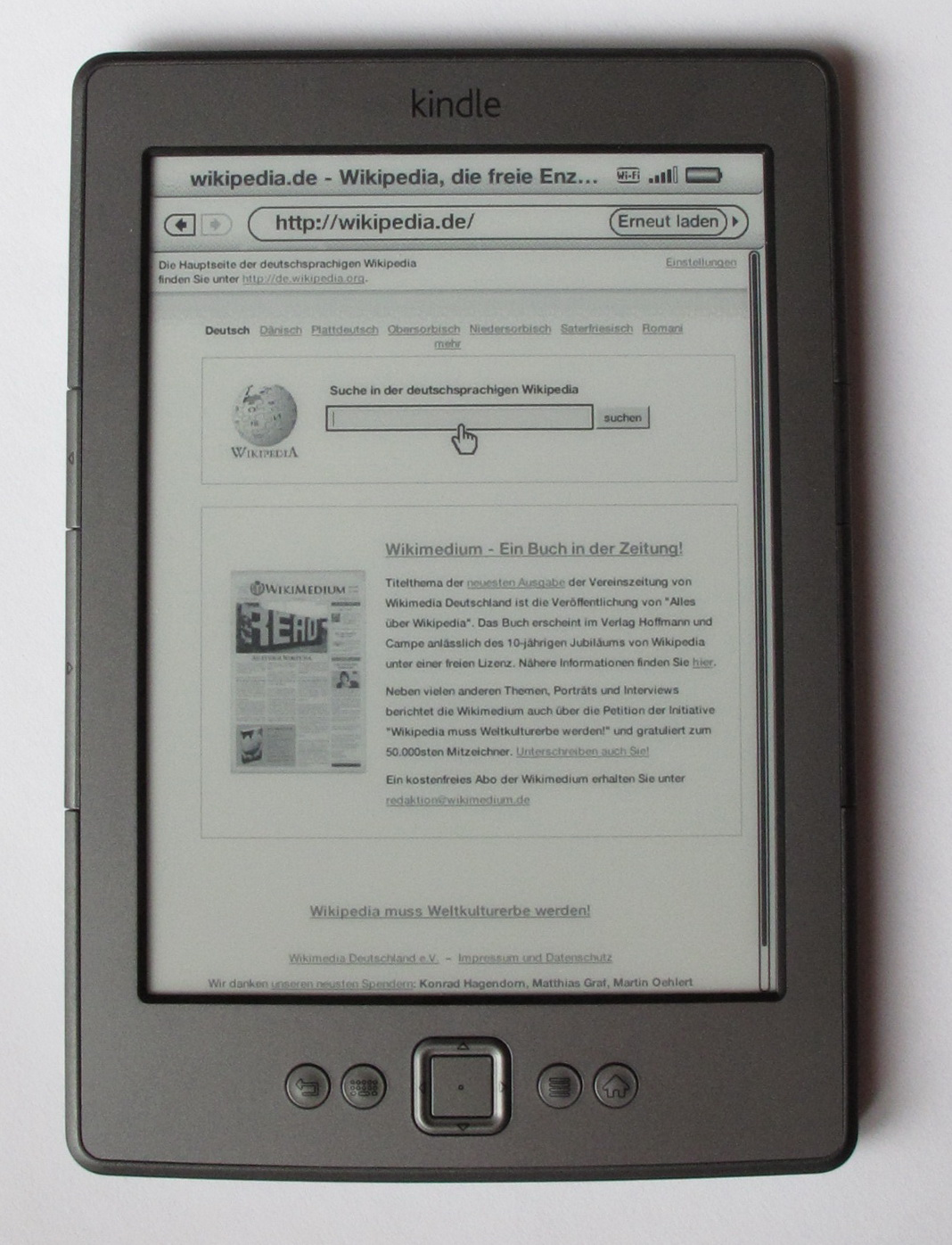
The ebook this new generation of authors is named after

The term Generation Kindle (in Spanish: Generación Kindle) refers to authors who publish their works digitally through Kindle Direct Publishing (KDP) (Amazon.com). The term has been adopted by the media.

Writer Esteban Navarro is said to have coined the term Generation Kindle, a tweet dated February 11, 2012.

== Notables ==
Some of the notable members include:

- Juan Gómez-Jurado
- John Locke
- Amanda Hocking
- Esteban Navarro
- Bruno Nievas
- Blanca Miosi
