= Horizon Organic =

North American dairy company

- Type: Subsidiary
- Industry: Dairy
- Founded: 1991; 35 years ago
- Headquarters: Broomfield, Colorado, U.S.
- Products: Milk, butter, cheese, eggs, cream
- Parent: Dean Foods; (2004–17); Danone; (2017–2024); Platinum Equity; (2024–present)
- Website: horizon.com

Horizon Organic is an American company that produces organic milk and other organic food products. The largest supplier of organic milk in North America, its products are sold in supermarkets and grocery stores.

Founded in 1991, it produces organic milk in Maryland and also purchases the majority of its organic milk (more than 99 percent) from more than 700 dairies in 23 states. Horizon Organic's products are certified organic by the USDA and advertised as free of antibiotics, growth hormones and pesticides.

Prior to being acquired by Dean Foods in 2004, it was a public company and owner of the organic dairy brands: Juniper Valley Farms, The Organic Cow of Vermont and UK brand Rachel's Organic.

On April 2, 2024, global investment firm Platinum Equity announced that it had completed the purchase of a controlling stake in Horizon Organic.

== History ==
Horizon was founded in Boulder, Colorado in 1991 By Mark Retzloff and Paul Rupetto and began selling nationally in 1994. It sponsored a local K-8 school's extracurricular activities and even named their mascot, the Horizon Heifers.

After going public in 1998, the company was acquired by Dean Foods. In 2006, the Organic Consumers Association organized a boycott of Horizon Organic (and Aurora Organic Dairy), alleging that the company was not following organic standards.

In August, 2006, the Cornucopia Institute filed a complaint with the USDA alleging that Horizon Organic violated National Organic Program standards in reference to the amount of time their dairy cows should spend in pasture. As a result of the boycott, one of the largest natural food cooperatives, PCC Natural Markets in Seattle, decided to discontinue Horizon Organic products from their customer offerings.

In 2009, parent company Dean Foods was sued by a group of dairymen for allegedly creating a monopoly on milk in the Southeastern U.S. In 2010, Horizon published "Organic Standards of Care" guidelines which outlines its livestock and organic dairy practices

In 2013, WhiteWave Foods (owner of the Horizon brand) became an independent company from Dean Foods. In April 2017, almost a year after an agreement between the parties was announced, the French company Danone completed the purchase of WhiteWave for $10.4 billion, creating a new unit called DanoneWave.

In 2023, a PETA investigation showed cows at a farm that supplied Horizon suffering from untreated diseases and injuries, which PETA alleged constituted animal abuse. Following the investigation, Horizon stopped purchasing from the supplier.

In 2024, it was reported that Platinum Equity had purchased a controlling stake in Horizon Organic.
