= Customer Alliance =

German Software company based in Berlin

CA Customer Alliance GmbH
- Type: Private Limited Liability
- Industry: Software industry
- Founded: 2009; 17 years ago
- Founders: Torsten Sabel; Moritz Klussmann
- Headquarters: Berlin, Germany
- Area served: Worldwide
- Products: Web Applications
- Number of employees: 40+ (2026)
- Website: customer-alliance.com

Customer Alliance is a German software company that offers a cloud-based platform for customer reviews and feedback management and analysis. The platform is used by businesses in a variety of industries, including hospitality, healthcare, automotive, and insurance.

Customer Alliance helps businesses collect reviews and feedback from customers at various touchpoints, such as through email, SMS, QR codes, and in-web and in-app surveys. The platform also tracks metrics such as customer satisfaction scores (CSAT), net promoter scores (NPS), and customer effort scores (CES). The objective of Customer Alliance's analytics is to identify common customer pain points and areas for improvement from the data collected.

Customer Alliance also enables businesses to share reviews on third-party sites, such as TripAdvisor, Google, and HolidayCheck. It provides an embed a widget that customers can put on their websites to display aggregated feedback.

Customer Alliance is a player in the review management software market, and is a competitor of famous solutions like Reviewflowz and Gominga.

The company's headquarters are Berlin, and it has employees of 18 different nationalities and provides services in 35 countries over Europe and Central America.

== History ==
Torsten Sabel and Moritz Klussmann co-founded Customer Alliance in 2009, starting with the German hotel market. Since then, the company has expanded internationally.

In 2010, Customer Alliance won second place in the "Sprungbrett" competition in the category "Best Startup". The competition was part of "Online Innovation Days" of the Verband Internet Reisevertrieb e.V. (VIR). In 2011, the company received a six-digit seed investment from Mountain Super Angel and Hightech Gründerfonds.

In 2012, Customer Alliance became an official partner of the German Hotel Association (Deutscher Hotelverband IHA) and won the German Silicon Valley Accelerator. The program is supported by the Federal Ministry of Economics and Technology. In the same year, the company opened a branch in Querétaro, Mexico.

In June 2019, Customer Alliance announced its merger with Toocan, a Berlin-based company that owns HotelNavigator.
