= The House Across the Street (novel) =

2012 novel by Esteban Navarro

- First edition (Kindle)
- Author: Esteban Navarro
- Language: Spanish
- Publication date: 2012
- Publication place: Spain
- Media type: Print

The House Across the Street (Spanish:La casa de enfrente) is a 2012 novel by the Spanish writer Esteban Navarro.

== History ==
The novel is a paradigm of digital publishing, since its author is considered one of the pioneers. In a short time, it became one of the best selling ebooks.

== Bibliography ==
- Ediciones B. World Literature in Spanish: An Encyclopedia: An Encyclopedia. ABC-CLIO, 20 Oct 2011.
