= Esteban Navarro =

Spanish novelist (born 1965)

Esteban Navarro Soriano
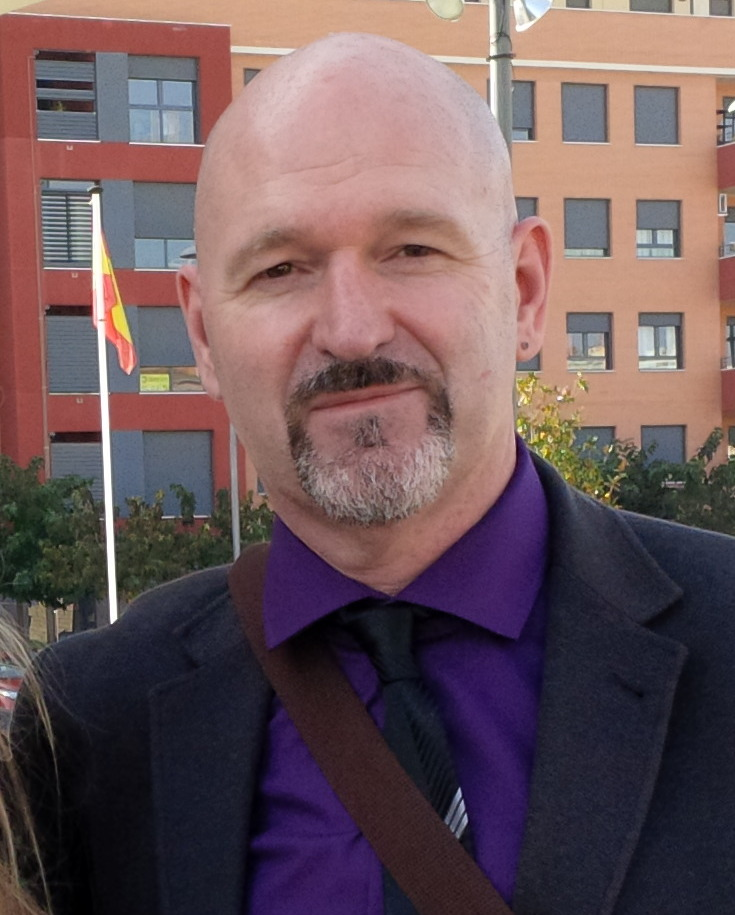
- Navarro Soriano en 2013
- Born: Esteban Navarro Soriano; 18 March 1965 (age 61); Murcia, Spain, Murcia, Spain
- Occupations: Journalist, novelist
- Writing career
- Language: Spanish
- Genre: literary fiction
- Notable works: The House Across the Street; Policemen Story
- Website: estebannavarrosoriano.github.io

Esteban Navarro Soriano (born 18 March 1965, in Moratalla, Murcia, Spain) is a Spanish novelist. He is known for being one of the pioneers in digital publishing. Was an agent of the national police from 1994 to 2018.

== Career ==
In 2008 the novel The Bering Reactor won a prize in the Katharsis short story contest.

In April 2011 he was awarded at the La Balsa de Piedra contest, organized by the José Saramago Foundation, for his novel El Buen Padre. The novel is included as a guide to getting to know Madrid, the city where it is set.

The novel La casa de enfrente (The House Across the Street) is a paradigm of digital publishing, since its author is considered one of the pioneers. In a short time it became one of the best selling ebooks.

In April 2013, coinciding with Book Day and Sant Jordi, Navarro participated as a pioneer KDP author in an event organized by Amazon in Barcelona. The event included a KDP workshop and a 'speed dating' session with established authors (such as Juan Gómez-Jurado, Fernando Gamboa and Lena Blau), where he shared experiences with aspiring writers.

In January 2013, he was a finalist in the 69th edition of the Premio Nadal with the novel La noche de los peones.

His novel Una historia de policías has been very controversial, because Navarro, being a police officer, is about a mafia inside the national police. The publication Business Insider chose this novel as a representation of the city of Huesca (Spain).

His novella La cuarta memoria was chosen for the Lloret Negre Black Novel Festival as the best black novel published in 2022.

In the book El Ajedrecista, written by Esteban Navarro Soriano, drug trafficker Gilberto Rodríguez Orejuela is described as someone very influential who liked to get along with Mexican show business stars such as Roberto Gómez Bolaños Chespirito or El Chavo del 8.

== Personal life ==
Navarro has been based in Huesca (Spain) since 2001.

Is considered the creator of the term Generation Kindle, referring to writers who emerged on the Kindle digital platform. This "Generación Kindle" brings together authors who, although they are of different ages and styles, publish their works through Kindle Direct Publishing (KDP). The term has been embraced by the media to refer to all the authors who publish and succeed through ebooks.

In his province, Huesca, he is known for organizing literary activities related to crime novels.

He has won numerous short story awards.

He is a well-known Spanish social media personality.

== List of works in Spanish ==
- 2026 El hombre del ático
- 2026 Progresión
- 2025 La sombra de Anubis
- 2024 Montesblancos
- 2023 Baco
- 2023 Medianoche
- 2022 La cuarta memoria
- 2022 La suerte del debutante
- 2021 Un año de prácticas
- 2020 El altruista
- 2020 Rock Island
- 2020 Verdugos
- 2020 Natasha
- 2019 El ajedrecista
- 2019 La rubia del Tívoli
- 2019 El cónsul infiltrado
- 2018 El apagón
- 2018 Penumbra
- 2017 El club de la élite
- 2017 La marca del pentágono
- 2017 Una historia de policías
- 2016 El reactor de Bering
- 2016 Ángeles de granito
- 2015 La gárgola de Otín
- 2015 Los ojos del escritor
- 2015 El buen padre
- 2014 La puerta vacía
- 2014 Diez días de julio
- 2013 Los fresones rojos
- 2013 Los crímenes del abecedario
- 2012 La noche de los peones
- 2011 La casa de enfrente

== Controversy ==
In 2017, the Directorate-General of the Police opened an Information File of him in his capacity as an official of the National Police after having published his novel A history of police, although the author unlinked the file with the publication of this work.

This news had a lot of media coverage even in international newspapers, such as The Guardian. In the indictment they pointed out that "some officials of the police station in Huesca" were worried that their activity in social networks would damage the image of the body to which it belongs.

The controversy between Arturo Pérez-Reverte and Esteban Navarro Soriano involves a private exchange that became public and sparked a debate on social media. Esteban Navarro, a less-known Spanish writer, had mentioned Pérez-Reverte in a positive light on the platform X (formerly Twitter). However, Pérez-Reverte responded in a private message, politely but firmly asking Navarro to stop including him in his posts. Pérez-Reverte wished Navarro well with his books but made his discomfort with being mentioned on social media clear. Navarro apologized and promised not to mention him again, yet Pérez-Reverte proceeded to block Navarro's account, which surprised and confused Navarro.

This incident led to a wave of reactions from users, highlighting an unexpected feud between the two authors. The messages were made public by Navarro on X, adding fuel to the discussion about the etiquette of social media interactions among public figures, especially those within the literary community. This episode underscores the complexities and sensitivities surrounding online mentions and the privacy of personal communications when they intersect with public personas.

== Social media activity ==
Esteban Navarro Soriano is active on X (formerly Twitter) as @EstebanNavarroS. His comments on current affairs, literature prizes, and public figures have been cited by Spanish outlets including El Plural, Cadena SER, and El País. One example is his October 2025 remark on the Premio Planeta, which El Plural described as an ‘applauded reflection’ that sparked debate about the prize’s transparency. These contributions have also been referenced in other media such as El Economista, Diario Red, and Huffington Post.
