= Stonyfield Farm (Wilton, New Hampshire) =

- U.S. National Register of Historic Places
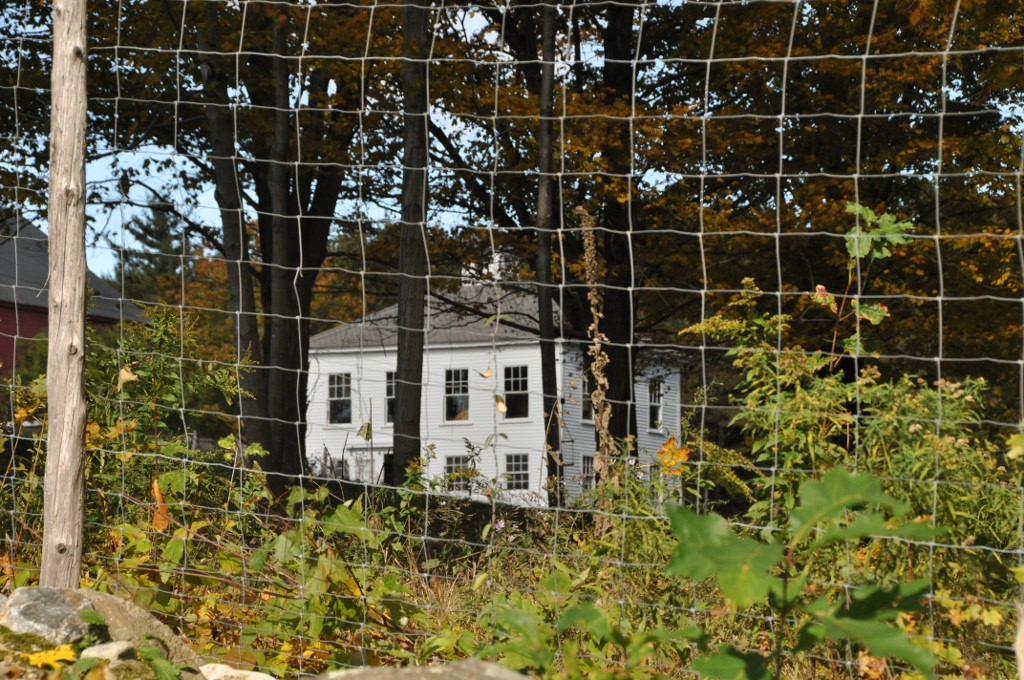
- The garage

- Location within New Hampshire Location within the United States
- Location: Barrett Hill Rd., Wilton, New Hampshire
- Area: 159 acres (64 ha)
- Built: 1803
- Built by: Barrett, Ebenezer
- Architectural style: Colonial Revival, Federal
- NRHP reference No.: 83001142
- Added to NRHP: August 3, 1983

Stonyfield Farm, also known as the Ebenezer Barrett Farm, is a historic farm on Barrett Hill Road in Wilton, New Hampshire. Established in 1803 by Ebenezer Barrett, the farm layout and buildings represent a well-preserved example of a rural hill country farm of the 19th century, which survived in part by being transformed into a gentleman's farm in the early 20th century. It is on this farm that noted yogurt maker Stonyfield Farm was founded. The farm was listed on the National Register of Historic Places in 1983.

== Description and history ==
The Barrett farm is set on 159 acres (64 ha) of land in the rural upland area of northern Wilton and southern Lyndeborough. Much of its land is now wooded, but there are cleared fields surrounding the farmstead complex, which is located at the end of Barrett Hill Road, and bisected by a formerly public right-of-way known as Old Coach Road, portions of which are lined by old stone walls. The complex includes an 1803 Federal style brick farmhouse, a 19th-century barn, a garage which was added c. 1920, and a c. 1927 greenhouse which was moved to the farm c. 1950.

The farm was established by Ebenezer Barrett, a migrant from Chelmsford, Massachusetts, in 1803. The farm was worked by Barrett and two generations of descendants during the 19th century, and became a gentleman's farm in the early 20th century. The property was leased in 1978 to the Rural Education Center, a non-profit agricultural education organization. The center was run by Samuel Kaymen, and it is here that the yogurt maker Stonyfield Farm was founded.

== See also ==
- National Register of Historic Places listings in Hillsborough County, New Hampshire
