= Michael Podolsky =

Ukrainian-American politician (born 1974)

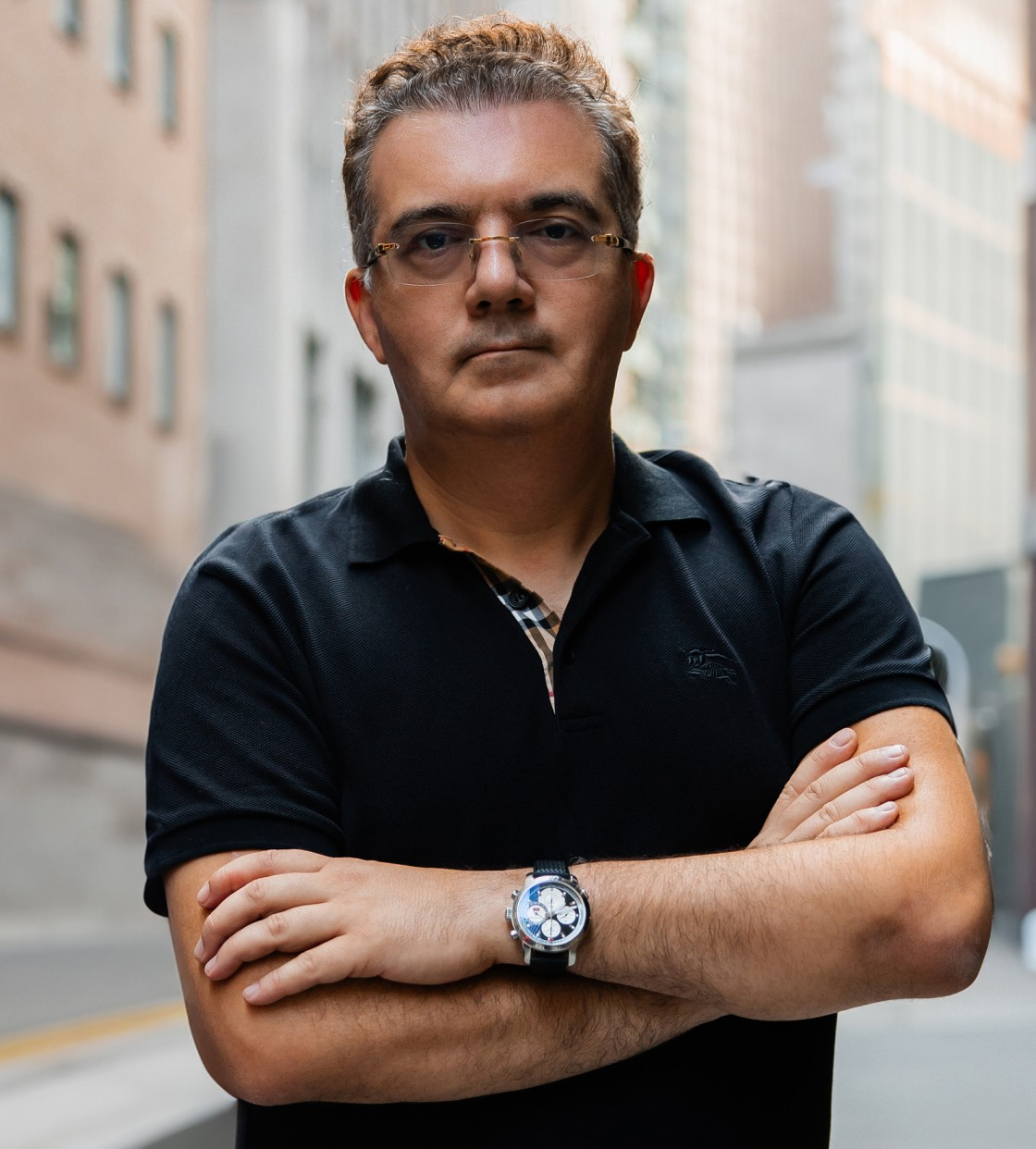
- Born: April 7, 1974 (age 52); Ukraine
- Education: Kharkiv State Polytechnic University; Queens College (CUNY); NYU Stern School of Business
- Occupations: businessman and consumer-rights advocate

Michael Podolsky (born in Ukraine, April 7, 1974) is a Ukrainian-American businessman and government official. He is the co-founder of the PissedConsumer website. He served in various deputy ministerial roles in Ukraine between 2015 and 2023, focusing on foreign trade, sanctions policy, and the modernization of e-government services.

== Early life and education ==
Michael Podolsky was born in Ukraine and later moved to the United States to pursue higher education and begin his career.

From 1991 to 1993, he studied at Kharkiv State Polytechnic University, where he earned a Bachelor of Arts in Management and Economics. From 1993 to 1996, he attended Queens College, City University of New York, graduating with a Bachelor of Science in Computer Science. Between 2000 and 2004, he completed an MBA in Finance at NYU Stern School of Business.

== Business career ==
Michael Podolsky started his career in 1995 at JPMorgan Chase in network administration, later holding developer and analyst roles at Bank of America and Banc of America Securities. In 1999, he joined Robeco USA as Vice President of Applications Development, a position he held until 2005. He then worked as a consultant for firms including UBS, CGI-AMS, and Allianz Global Investors. From 2007 to 2011, he managed investor-services technology, and in 2011, he became the Director of Investor Services Technology at SS&C GlobeOp.

In 2006, Podolsky and a business partner launched PissedConsumer.com with an initial investment of $200, providing consumers with a public forum for grievances. Over time, the site has grown to host millions of consumer reviews, serve over 28 million registered users, and have online reviews on more than 158,000 companies. By 2025, the company had expanded its service to include artificial intelligence, business strategy, and engineering.

In late 2015, PissedConsumer published numerous complaints about Roca Labs, a weight‑loss company that was later targeted by a Federal Trade Commission investigation for deceptive promotions. In January 2016, PissedConsumer initiated legal action to counter false DMCA takedown notices submitted by entities associated with Roca Labs, defending consumer speech and exposing misuse of copyright claims to suppress criticism.

In 2023, Podolsky was nominated for the Top 100 USA Entrepreneurs of Ukrainian Origin and received the TOP USA Award for his business achievements. In 2024, he received a Gold Stevie Award in the category Best Entrepreneur – Consumer Services at the American Business Awards.

In 2023, 2024 and 2025, both PissedConsumer and WiserBrand were placed on the Inc. 5000 list of America's fastest-growing private companies.

== Social responsibility ==
In 2023, Podolsky and PissedConsumer.com launched the Ukraine Support Project, which provided Ukrainian and American consumers with information about companies that continued to operate and pay taxes in Russia.
