= Garelick Farms =

American dairy company

- Type: Private (1931–1997); Subsidiary (1997–)
- Industry: Dairy
- Founded: 1931; 95 years ago
- Products: Milk
- Parent: Dean Foods
- Website: garelickfarms.com

Garelick Farms, a subsidiary of Dairy Farmers of America, is a manufacturer of dairy products in the Northeastern United States. Founded in 1931, it remained owned by the Garelick family and descendants until 1997, when it was purchased by Suiza Foods, which acquired Dean Foods in 2001.

== Production ==
Garelick Farms processes and manufactures dairy products such as milk, cream, ice cream, sour cream, cottage cheese and juices. It has four manufacturing plants in Massachusetts, Maine, and New York, and purchases raw milk from approximately 1,000 local dairies in the region. It is among the largest regional dairies in the United States, and is the largest dairy east of the Mississippi River. In 2006, Garelick Farms processed over a half-million gallons of milk each day.

Garelick Farms' operations included 17 plastic bottle manufacturing facilities located from Texas to Maine. This was later consolidated into a subsidiary company by Suiza Foods, which was named Franklin Plastics, Inc. In May 2018, Garelick Farms informed its employees that the plant in Lynn, Massachusetts would be closing.
