= Louis Trauth Dairy =

American dairy company

Coordinates: 39.085062°N 84.488943°W

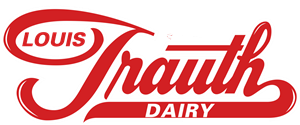
- Company type: Private (1920–1997)
- Industry: Dairy
- Founded: 1920
- Founder: Louis Trauth
- Defunct: 2011; 15 years ago
- Products: Milk, sour cream, cottage cheese
- Owner: Suiza Food Corp (1997–2001); Dean Foods (2001–2011)

Louis Trauth Dairy was founded in 1920 by the senior Louis Trauth. It was based in Newport, Kentucky, USA. It began from a 600-square-foot (56 m^{2}) plant and competed with 54 other dairies in the Greater Cincinnati area. It had a modern facility covering five city blocks. There had been three multimillion-dollar expansions since 1985 to provide more efficient production and distribution of dairy products. Trauth Dairy was one of the first dairies in the area to vacuum pasteurize milk, and the first in Cincinnati to introduce tamper-evident packaging for sour cream, cottage cheese and dips. Trauth Dairy was the sole manufacturer of Fat Free plus a/B milk.

In 1997, the company was sold to Suiza Food Corp for an undisclosed price. It came under the Dean Foods brand in 2001 after the company merged with Suiza Food.

In 2011, the dairy closed after 91 years in business.
