= T. G. Lee Dairy =

American dairy company

T. G. Lee
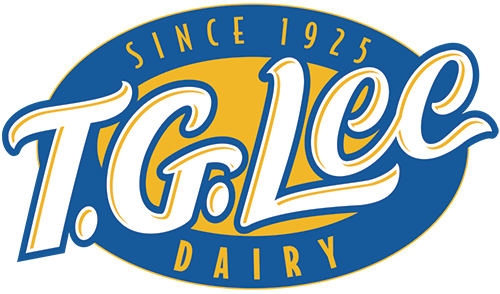
- Type: Subsidiary
- Industry: Dairy
- Founded: 1925; 101 years ago
- Headquarters: Orlando, Florida, United States
- Products: Milk
- Parent: Dean Foods
- Website: tgleedairy.com

T.G. Lee Dairy is a dairy cooperative originally founded as a dairy farm with a single cow in 1925. Today, it processes, packages and markets dairy products for dairy farmers in the U.S. state of Florida. The cooperative's headquarters are located in Orlando. Following the bankruptcy of parent Dean Foods of Texas, it is now a regional brand of Dairy Farmers of America.

Its founder, Thomas Gilbert Lee (1894-1986), initially started his farm to produce dairy products for Central Florida. As of 1992, dairy farming operations had ceased but there are T.G. Lee processing plants across the state, and its branded dairy products are sold in supermarkets, convenience stores, restaurants, and institutional food service operations. Beginning in the 1960's, it was among the first dairy farms in Florida to use artificial cattle breeding techniques.

The area of independent businesses around the T.G. Lee Dairy main headquarters is known colloquially as "The Milk District."

T.G. Lee was once known for promoting yellow-plastic milk containers, originally introduced and trademarked by Galliker Dairy of Johnstown PA. Compared to translucent plastic containers, these were claimed to help preserve milk quality, and protect minerals and vitamins in the milk from the effects of exposure to fluorescent lighting on supermarket shelves. Scientific studies were deceptively cited by numerous marketers of yellow plastic dairy packaging, but these studies had only shown that fibreboard containers were protective vs translucent plastic, while the yellow plastic jugs had not actually been tested.
