= Una historia de Policías =

2017 novel by Esteban Navarro

Policemen Story
- Author: Esteban Navarro
- Original title: Una historia de policías
- Language: Spanish
- Genre: Thriller; Crime fiction
- Publication date: 2017
- Publication place: Spain
- Media type: Print
- Pages: 282 Kindle Edition
- ISBN: 978-1-0985-8203-6
- Website: https://books.google.es/books/about/Una_historia_de_policías.html?id=c_61ywEACAAJ&redir_esc=y

Policemen Story (Spanish: Una historia de policías) is a police novel penned by writer Esteban Navarro, published in 2017 by the publishing house Playa de Ákaba. This novel stirred significant controversy after a complaint was lodged by the police station where the author served, alleging that the book portrayed mafia-like practices among some officers.

== Argument ==
Five friends bond at the National Police Academy in 1995. After twenty years in the profession, they reunite in the city of Huesca, Spain. One night, one of them asks his colleagues for one last favor: there's a corpse in the trunk of his car, and he needs their help to dispose of it.

== Controversy ==
Despite the author's denials across various media, the press continues to assert that there is a connection between the publication of this novel and the investigation initiated by the General Directorate of the Police following an anonymous complaint from Huesca.

Furthermore, it has been suggested that the author might be forced to resign from the police force after several years of service, leaving the identification of the complainants unresolved, especially if the novel only achieves six print editions.

== Huesca Representation ==
On 10 February 2019, Business Insider's list will feature this novel, representing the city of Huesca, Spain, in a selection titled A Book Per Province.
