= Customer review =

Review of a product or service by one of its customers

A customer review is an evaluation of a product or service made by someone who has purchased and used, or had experience with, a product or service. Customer reviews are a form of customer feedback on electronic commerce and online shopping sites. There are also dedicated review sites, some of which use customer reviews as well as or instead of professional reviews. The reviews may themselves be graded for usefulness or accuracy by other users. Customer reviews are widely used by consumers to make informed purchasing decisions and compare products and services online.

== History ==
Before the arrival of the internet, customers could review products and services through customer comment boxes and customer service helplines. These methods still exist today although internet review sites are used more in recent years.

== Reliability ==
The reliability of customer reviews has been questioned. There have been calls for review sites to prevent abuses akin to ballot stuffing of favourable reviews by the seller (known as incentivized reviews), or negative reviews by competitors. Gathering fake reviews has become a significant business. In 2012, for example, fake book reviews have been revealed as significantly affecting ratings on Amazon. Although Amazon banned the practice of reviewing complimentary products in 2016, researchers have shown that the process still continued as of 2021, but without any disclosures.

Since few sites restrict users to reviewing only items they have purchased, it is often difficult to know if a customer is real, has used the product they are reviewing and is giving honest, unbiased feedback. Tools like Fakespot and ReviewMeta can help identify fake reviews on shopping sites such as Amazon. However, these tools do not work on all review websites. Even genuine customer reviews may be influenced by previously posted evaluations. A study of Amazon book reviews found that, holding product quality constant, later reviews tended to differ systematically from earlier reviews, with the effect varying with product popularity, the variance of previous ratings, and whether reviewers referred to earlier reviews.

Public calls have been growing stronger, demanding that review sites be held accountable for publishing fake reviews. Most recently (June 2021), the Competition and Markets Authority (CMA) in the United Kingdom has launched an investigation into whether Amazon and Google are doing enough to prevent fake reviews from being published on their sites. Both businesses claim to have sufficient resources and policies in place to prevent fake reviews from being published. Legal steps could be taken against the giants if CMA determines those claims to be false. The problem has become so widespread that in 2023, the FTC announced plans to ban fake reviews and testimonials.

Whether a customer receives an invitation or not, many businesses have expressed the wish that customers let the business know in the moment if some aspect of their interaction or product is unsatisfactory, so they can have the opportunity to fix it on the spot or provide compensation, rather than customers leaving unnecessarily disappointed and writing negative reviews.

=== Fake review scandals ===
In 2010, British historian Orlando Figes posted reviews on Amazon praising his own work and criticizing that of his rivals.

In August 2012, The New York Times revealed that John Locke had paid an online service to write reviews of his books, in order to artificially boost sales.

In 2022, researchers from UCLA documented that millions of Amazon sellers purchase fake 5-star reviews through private Facebook groups.

=== Spoof reviews ===
Humorous customer reviews are common on some major shopping sites, such as Amazon. These are often ironically or sarcastically praising reviews of products deemed kitsch or mundane. Another example is methylated spirits described in the style of a wine review. A product may become an internet meme attracting large numbers of spoof reviews, which may boost its sales. Famous examples include Tuscan Whole Milk and the Three Wolf Moon T-shirt.

Examples of spoof reviews include:

- A Million Random Digits with 100,000 Normal Deviates (book)
- Osama Bin Laden's Hideout Compound (humorous reviews of Osama bin Laden's hideout compound written by Google Maps users after his killing on 1 May 2011)
- Uranium Ore
- "BIC Cristal For Her Ball Pen"

British spoofers have targeted several build to order novelty products made by Media Storehouse from two million licensed photo library images, including a canvas print of minor celebrity Paul Ross, and a jigsaw puzzle of Nick Humby, a former finance director of Manchester United.
