= Silk (brand) =

American brand of dairy substitute products

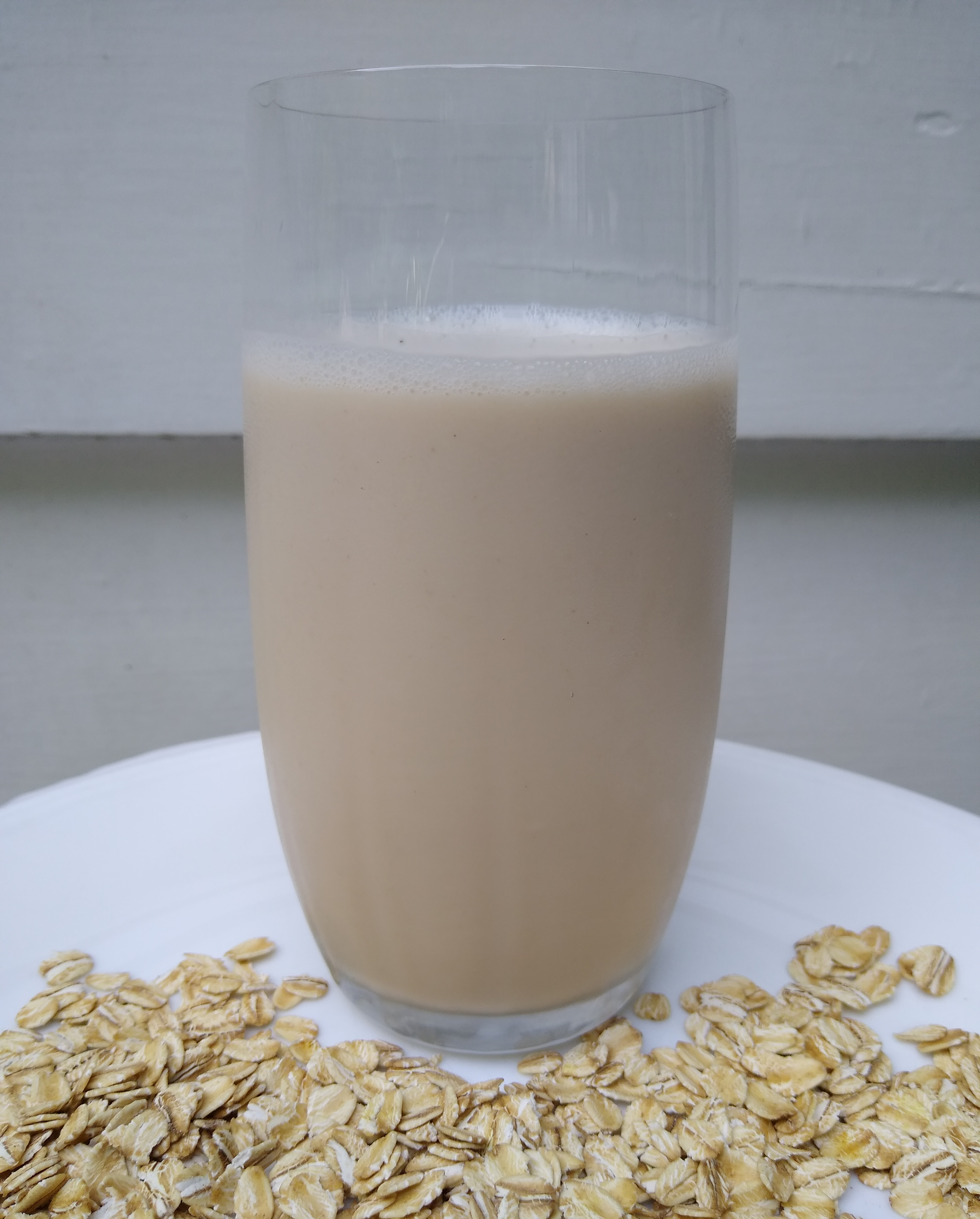
- A glass of Oat yeah! Silk oat milk
- Product type: Plant milk
- Current owner: Danone (2017–present)
- Produced by: Danone North America
- Country: United States
- Introduced: 1977; 49 years ago
- Markets: North America
- Previous owners: Dean Foods (2002–13); Whitewave Foods (1977–2002, 2013–17)
- Website: silk.com

Silk is an American brand of dairy-substitute products (including soy milk, soy yogurt, almond milk, almond yogurt, cashew milk, coconut milk, oat milk, and other dairy-alternative products) currently owned by Danone after it purchased WhiteWave Foods in 2016.

== History ==
Whitewave Foods was founded in Boulder, Colorado, in 1977 by Steve Demos, initially focusing on soy and tofu products.

In 2002 WhiteWave, Inc was sold to Dean Foods for over $300 million. According to Silk's web site in August 2009, all its soy beans are sourced from North America including organic and non-GMO soybeans.

In January 2010, the company introduced Silk Pure Almond, an almond milk, and its first non-soy-based product.

In 2013, WhiteWave Foods separated from Dean Foods, and became an independent, publicly traded company.

Silk has been a five-year recipient of the Green Power Leadership Award from the U.S. Department of Energy and the Environmental Protection Agency.

In July 2016 it was announced that the multinational company Danone would purchase WhiteWave Foods for $10.4 billion. The acquisition was completed in April 2017 and newly formed company was named "DanoneWave"

== Lawsuit ==
In the fall of 2009 the Pioneer Press reported that the Cornucopia Institute had made complaints to the U.S. Department of Agriculture accusing Silk producer Dean Foods and its WhiteWave Foods division, of shifting their products away from organics without properly notifying retailers or consumers. According to the Star Telegram and other news sources, Silk brand soy milk was made using organic soybeans switched to conventional soybeans while maintaining the same UPC barcodes and prices on the Silk products while replacing the word "organic" with "natural" on the Silk product packaging.

Silk maintains that it sources only domestic/U.S. soy beans. The brand has also enrolled all of its products in the Non-GMO Project's verification process.
