= Rachel's Organic =

UK organic dairy business

Coordinates: 52°24′9.84″N 4°2′35.77″W

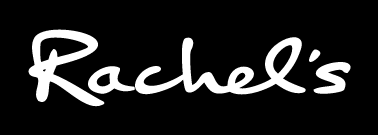
- Type: Private
- Industry: Organic Dairy products
- Founder: Rachel and Gareth Rowlands
- Headquarters: Glanyrafon, Aberystwyth, Wales
- Area served: United Kingdom
- Products: yogurt, milk, rice pudding, cream, crème fraiche
- Number of employees: 121
- Parent: Lactalis
- Website: www.rachelsorganic.co.uk

Rachel's is an organic dairy products company based in Aberystwyth, Wales. Founded by local farmers but now a subsidiary of French company Lactalis, it was the United Kingdom's first certified organic dairy.

== Background ==
The Williams family took over Brynllys farm in Ceredigion, West Wales, in 1942, and started developing a herd of Guernsey cows. Dinah Williams was the daughter of Abel Jones, Professor of Agriculture at Aberystwyth University, and his wife Bessie Brown MBE, the university’s first dairy instructor and organiser of the Women's Land Army in Wales during World War I. After World War II, Dinah often appeared with Lady Eve Balfour, trying to dissuade farmers from using artificial fertilisers and pesticides, leading to the formation of the Soil Association.

As a result, in 1952 Brynllys became one of the earliest members of the Soil Association, and established the farm as the first certified organic dairy farm. After the death of her husband in 1966, Williams handed over the farm to her middle daughter Rachel and son-in-law Gareth Rowlands. At this time they were supplying premium organic milk to the Milk Marketing Board.

In the mid-1980s, after a scriptwriter for BBC Radio 4 visited Brynllys, it inspired a storyline in The Archers when Pat and Tony Archer “went organic” at Bridge Farm. In 2009, Teleri Bevan published a book They Dared to Make a Difference, detailing the lives of the three family generations at Brynllys.

== History ==
The company was born out of the need for farming diversification. When heavy snow hit Aberystwyth in 1982, preventing milk tankers from reaching the isolated farm, the Rowlands were forced to find other uses for their milk. Using an old butter churn, they made cream and butter by hand. After the snow cleared, the Rowlands discovered they had inadvertently created a market for their dairy goods and they were spurred on to extend their range of products. Rachel began researching old recipes, including yogurt, and the Rachel’s Dairy brand was born as a company in 1984.

The home for the company’s production stayed on Brynllys farm, but between 1985 and 1990 the company experienced considerable growth, which resulted in a purpose-built dairy being built at Glanyrafon, Aberystwyth.

== Present ==
In 1999, the company was bought for £1.5M in an agreed takeover by United States dairy company Horizon Organic, their only presence in the UK. In 2004, Horizon was bought by Dean Foods based in Texas, the largest dairy distributor in the USA.

The company dropped the “organic” from its name in 2009 becoming simply Rachel’s. However, all products remained organic and include milk, butter, rice pudding, cream, crème fraiche and a variety of yogurts. In 2019 the name returned to Rachel's Organic.

On the 28 July 2010, it was confirmed that Dean Foods as part of their restructuring programme had agreed to sell a package of European dairy products companies including Rachel's to BSA International of Belgium, the holding company for France-based Lactalis Groupe, which itself will take operational control of Rachel's. The company has since moved production of all of its rice-based desserts to France.

In May 2012, Rachel's was moved into Lactalis Nestlé Chilled Dairy (LNCD), which is a joint venture with Nestlé. Lactalis owns 60% of LNCD and Nestlé 40%. Hence Rachel's was included in a boycott related to baby milk products by the Lactalis Nestlé from 2012 onwards.

=== Awards ===
Rachel’s has won numerous awards for the quality of its products and its innovation including Great Taste awards, and Wales the True Taste awards. In 2007 Rachel’s was recognised as one of Britain’s most environmentally friendly brands in a YouGov poll conducted by Marketing Week, and in 2009 was given Coolbrand status in the UK list of Superbrands. In July 2010, Rachel's received eight awards in the Dairy Produce Category at the Royal Welsh Show. Rachel's received a Gold award at Wales the True Taste Food & Drink Awards 2010, for their Wholemilk Gooseberry Yogurt.

== Products ==
- Yogurt
- Milk
- Rice pudding - produced in France
- Cream
- Crème fraiche

== See also ==
- Welsh cuisine
- Cuisine of Ceredigion
