= Dinah Williams =

British organic farmer (1911–2009)

- Born: 23 July 1911; Crugiau
- Died: 3 September 2009 (aged 98)
- Occupation: farmer

Dinah Williams born Dinah Eiluned Lyon Jones (23 July 1911 – 3 September 2009) was a British organic farmer. She was an early member of the Soil Association and she owned the first Welsh dairy farm to be recognised as organic.

== Life ==
Williams was born in "Crugiau" near Aberystwyth in 1911. She was the middle child of three. Her parents named her Dinah Eiluned Lyon Jones. Her father, Abel Edwin Jones, would become a professor of agriculture at the University College of Wales. Her Scottish mother, Bessie Brown MBE, was the first instructor of dairy farming at the university. Her father died when she was twelve and the same year she won a milking competition in London. Her mother bought Guernsey cows as well and her mother surprised her peers when she used seaweed as a fertiliser. She and her mother became committed farmers struggling though the 1920s. Their dairy farm was in the Clarach valley near Cardigan and they looked after Guernsey and Ayrshire cows. The "Nantllan" farm delivered the milk that they milked every morning to nearby farms. Their milk was not mixed together as the national Milk Marketing Board proposed and they resisted its new approaches.

They were open to new ideas and she was sent to Ukraine in a group led by Sir John Russell of the Rothamsted agricultural research station. She was impressed by the new ideas but hated the repressive life they led under Stalin. She married in the 1930s and they started their own small holding. Her mother later decided to retire and passed on the farm to Dinah's brother. After the World War II they moved to a 150 acre farm named "Brynllys Farm".

At "Brynllys" she farmed without using many chemicals but she learn the name for this style of farming during a talk by Lady Eve Balfour in 1952. Balfour's Haughley Experiments and her ideas about sustainable farming in her book "The Living Soil" had led to the creation of the Soil Association and Williams became a member.

In 1966 she allowed her daughter, Rachel Roberts, to take over "Brynllys" and she started an organic yoghurt business "Rachel's Organic" in 1984 as a move to diversify the farm's products.

Williams did not use doctors often, preferring naturopathic solutions. When she broke her wrist she used a doctor to set it, but insisted on not being given any pain relief.

== Death and legacy ==
She lived to the age of 98. In 2009, Teleri Bevan published a book They Dared to Make a Difference, detailing the lives of the three family generations at Brynllys farm. In 2021 a Purple Plaque was installed on a cow byre at her home in Borth to mark her achievements and pioneering work.
