= How now brown cow =

Phrase used in elocution

Vowel diagram for English diphthongs including /aʊ/, charting tongue height and position during articulation

"How now brown cow" is a phrase used in elocution teaching since at least 1926 to demonstrate the diphthong /aʊ/.
