= Aurora Organic Dairy =

American dairy company

- Current owner: Marcus Peperzak
- Country: United States
- Introduced: 2003
- Markets: United States
- Website: www.auroraorganic.com

Aurora Organic Dairy is an American company, based in Boulder, Colorado, which operates large factory farms, each with thousands of dairy cows, in Colorado and Texas. The company supplies and packages private-label, store-brand, organic dairy products for many of the country's largest grocery chains, including Wal-Mart, Safeway, Target and Costco.

The company was founded in 2003 by Marc Peperzak as a combined farm and bottling plant situated on a sloping plain north of Denver. In 2005, this had 5300 cows. At this time, the organic standards of the new company were already causing squabbles with other organic producers.

The Cornucopia Institute, a Wisconsin-based farm policy research group representing organic and family-scale farmers, complained to the USDA's Agricultural Marketing Service about their livestock management and organic practices. In particular, it was alleged that their cows were not allowed to graze upon pasture and were instead kept in feedlots or buildings. This was said to be contrary to the National Organic Program which the AMS administers.

In August 2007, Aurora was sanctioned by the United States Department of Agriculture after the agency investigated alleged violations of federal organic law. In August 2007, Aurora entered a consent agreement with the United States Department of Agriculture, and agreed not to sell as organic milk from cattle that may not have been raised organically. An agreement was reached by the USDA and Aurora which resulted in Aurora agreeing to reduce the size of its herd and provide cattle with pasture grazing during the growing season.

In June 2009, a court dismissed lawsuits against Aurora, grocery chains that sold Aurora's milk, and QAI, a certification body.

Cornucopia filed additional legal complaints against Aurora in 2009, claiming that Aurora does not provide sufficient grazing for its cattle, as required by regulations. According to Cornucopia, Aurora planted "substandard crops that are planted on an annual basis," not providing sufficient year-round grazing for cattle. Aurora responded by saying that Cornucopia's new claims were identical to those that were brought up in 2007, and were summarily dismissed.

In September 2012, Aurora agreed to pay $7.5 million to settle a class-action lawsuit over deceptive trade practices in its organic milk business.

== See also ==
- List of dairy product companies in the United States
