= Dean Foods =

American food and beverage company

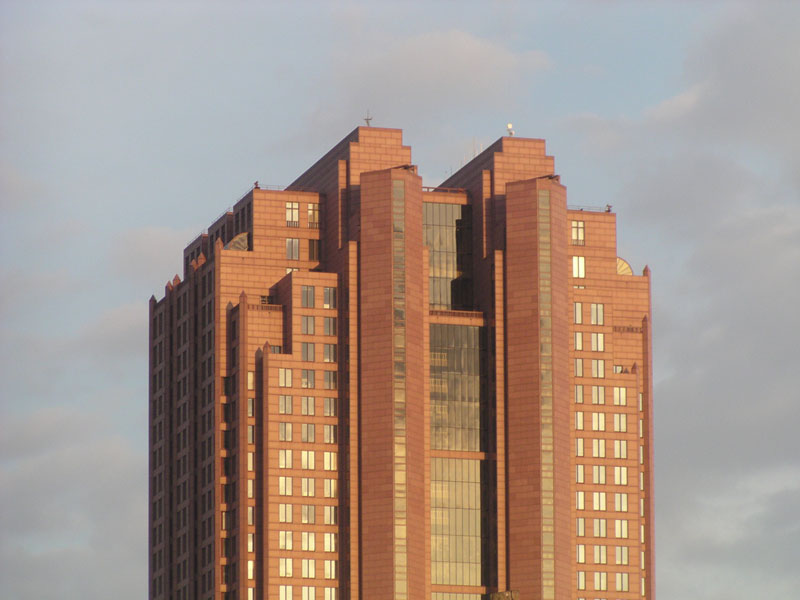
- Dean Foods headquarters in the Tower at Cityplace, Dallas, 2004
- Type: Public
- Industry: Food
- Founded: 1925; 101 years ago
- Founder: Samuel E. Dean Sr.
- Defunct: 2020; 6 years ago
- Fate: Bankruptcy, most assets acquired by Dairy Farmers of America
- Headquarters: Dallas, Texas, U.S.
- Key people: Gary W. Rahlfs (CEO)
- Products: Milk, dairy products, juice
- Revenue: ▼US$7.329 billion (2019)
- Operating income: ▼US$−399.7 million (2019)
- Net income: ▼US$−499.9 million (2019)
- Total assets: ▲US$2.229 billion (2019)
- Total equity: ▼US$−181.1 million (2019)
- Number of employees: 14,500 (2019)
- Website: deanfoods.com

Dean Foods was an American food and beverage company and the largest dairy company in the United States. The company's products included milk, ice cream, dairy products, cheese, juice, and teas. It processed milk in the United States under a number of regional and national brands. Founded in 1925, the company filed for Chapter 11 bankruptcy in 2019, and its assets were acquired by several buyers in 2020.

Headquartered in Dallas, Texas, Dean Foods maintained plants and distributors across the United States. The company had 66 manufacturing facilities in 32 U.S. states and distributed its products across all 50 states. Through acquisition and licensing, Dean produced dairy products under many well-known national and regional brand names such as: DairyPure, TruMoo, Friendly's, Mayfield, Dean's, Meadow Gold, Purity, Tuscan, T.G.Lee and Alta Dena.

== History ==
=== Founding ===
Dean Foods was founded by Samuel E. Dean Sr., who owned an evaporated milk processing facility in Franklin Park, Illinois, in the 1920s. After purchasing other Illinois dairy plants Dean developed the enterprise "from a small regional dairy into a diversified food company".

=== Acquisition and growth ===
In December 2001, the legacy brand of Dean Foods was acquired by the Dallas-based Suiza Foods Corporation, who later adopted the Dean Foods name. As part of the merger, 11 plants were divested under the name National Dairy to a group led by Dairy Farmers of America. In the first quarter of 2010 the company moved to the Cityplace district of Dallas, Texas.

=== Bankruptcy ===
In November 2019, Southern Foods Group, LLC d/b/a Dean Foods, and forty-two affiliated companies filed for Chapter 11 Bankruptcy in the United States District Court for the Southern District of Texas on November 12, 2019. The company cited the decline in consumption of cow's milk products; rendering them unable to meet their debt and pension obligations. The company stated that they were working with potential buyers for the company's assets. The cooperative Dairy Farmers of America was specifically named as a potential buyer. In 2020, all of Dean's assets were acquired by several companies. The largest share of assets was purchased by Dairy Farmers of America for $425 million.

== Products ==
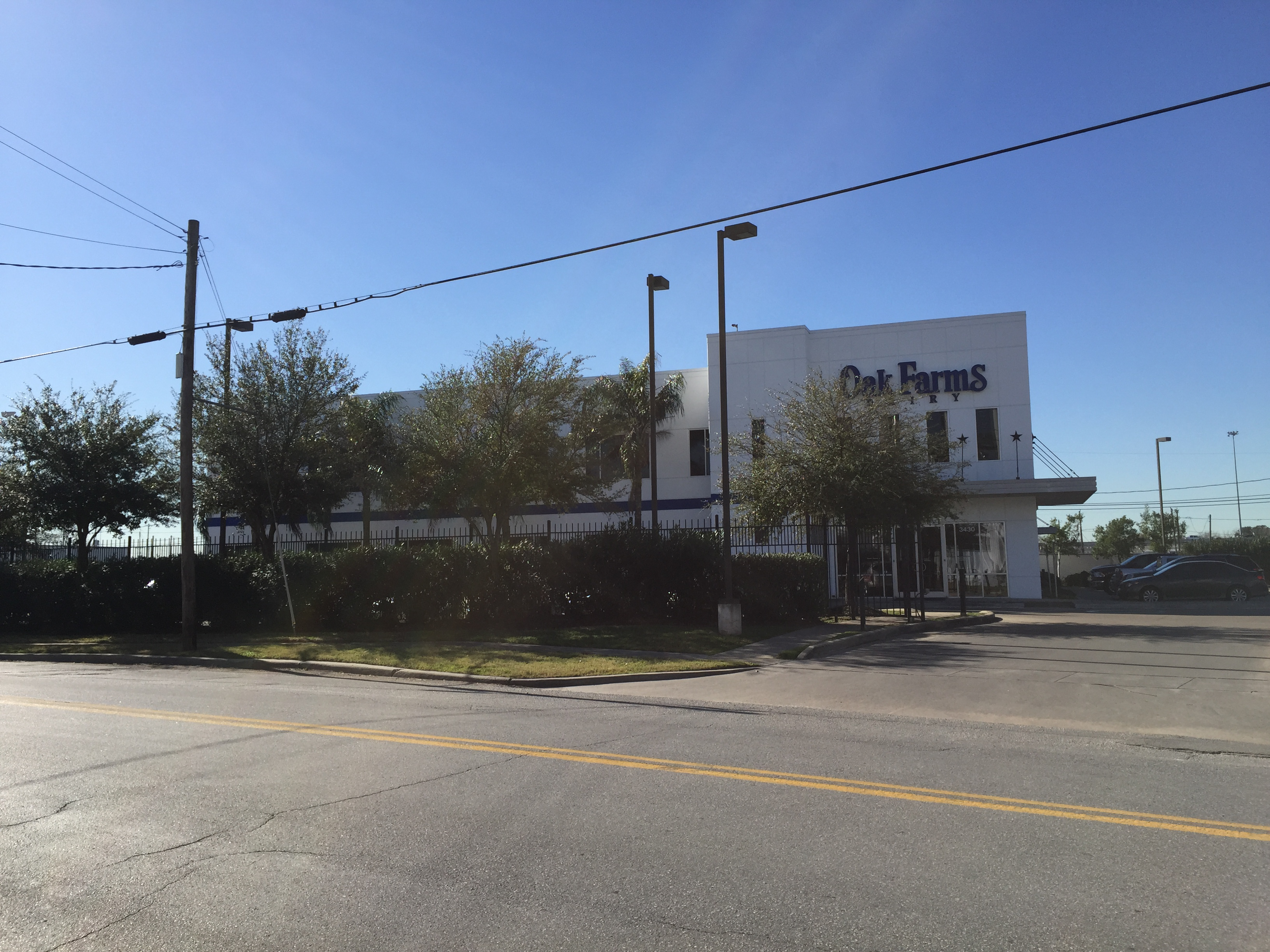
Oak Farms offices, East Downtown, Houston

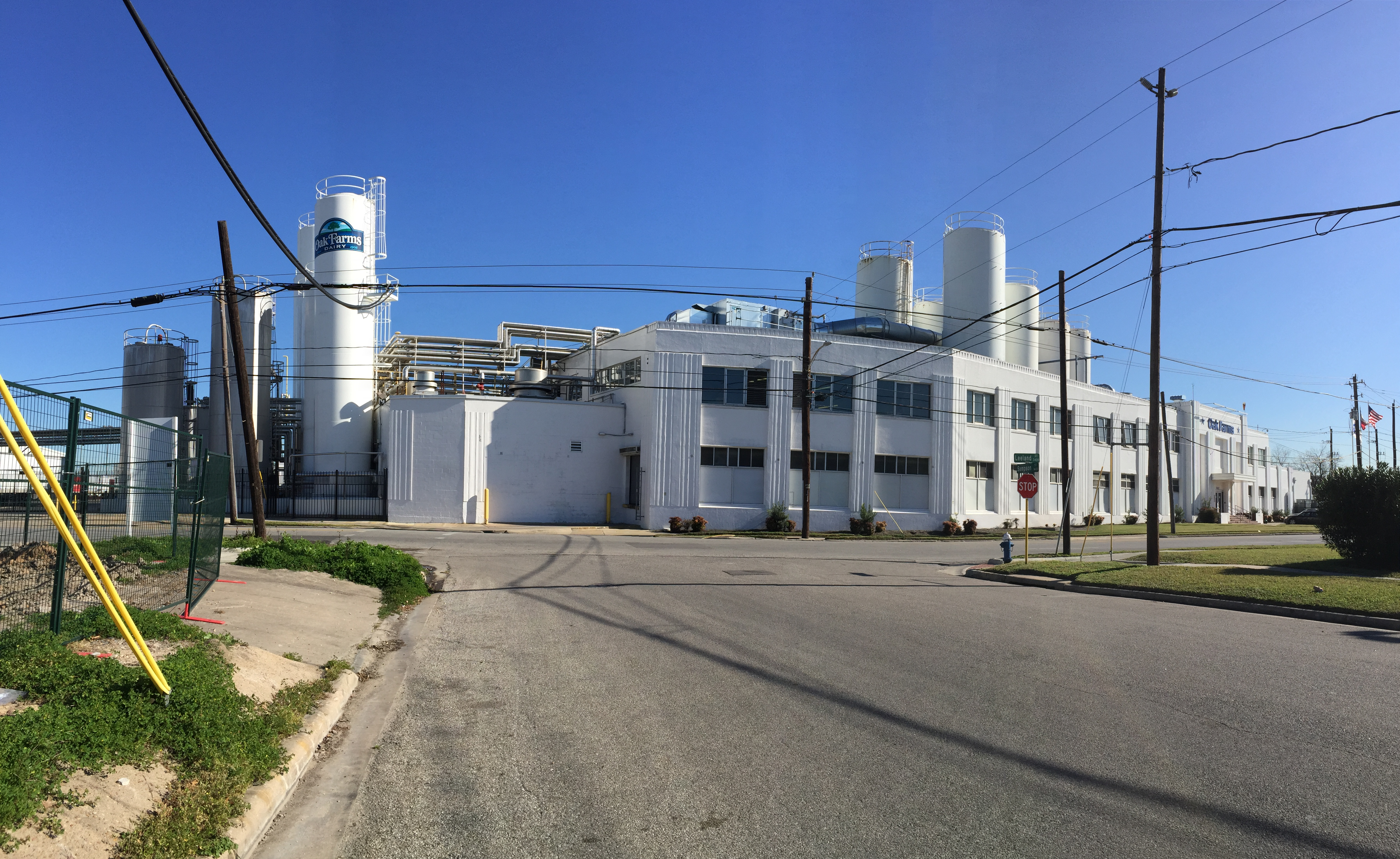
Oak Farms factory, East Downtown, Houston

=== National brands ===
==== Current ====
- DairyPure

==== Former ====
- Killer Shake – a subsidiary of Killer Productions Company (now defunct) is a former brand of chocolate milk with a dessert-like style. Dean Foods manufactured and sold this product under a license arrangement for the period January 1, 1996, through September 30, 1996.
- Uncle Matt's Organic

=== Regional brands ===
==== Current ====
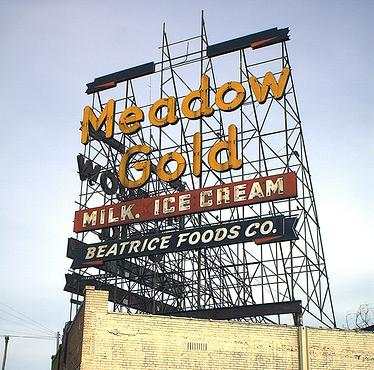
Meadowgold's advertisement

- Alta Dena, Southern California, Arizona
- Brown's Dairy, Louisiana, Alabama, Mississippi and Florida
- Country Fresh, Michigan and Wisconsin
- Creamland, New Mexico
- Dean's, Wisconsin, Illinois, Indiana, Ohio and Pennsylvania
- Friendly's, an ice cream brand served at restaurants and sold in stores
- Gandy's, West Texas
- Garelick Farms, New England
- Hygeia Dairy, South Texas
- Jilbert Dairy, Michigan's Upper Peninsula
- Lehigh Valley, Virginia, Maryland, Delaware, New Jersey and Pennsylvania
- Mayfield Dairy, Virginia, Georgia, and Tennessee
- Meadow Gold, Colorado, Idaho, Missouri, Montana, Southern Nevada, Oregon, Utah, Washington and Wyoming
- Oak Farms Dairy, Texas, Louisiana and Oklahoma
- PET Dairy, North Carolina, South Carolina, Georgia and Virginia
- Price's Creameries, El Paso, Texas and Southern New Mexico
- Purity Dairies, Tennessee, Kentucky and Alabama
- ReadyLeaf Tea
- Reiter Dairy, Ohio
- Swiss Premium, Pennsylvania
- T. G. Lee Dairy, Florida
- Tuscan Dairy Farms, New York and New Jersey

In May 2015 Dean Foods announced that they would introduce a national milk brand, DairyPure, which would appear alongside regional brands, in an attempt to boost sales.

==== Former ====
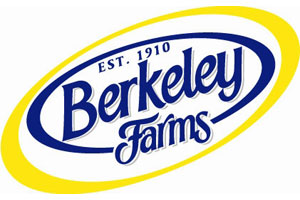
Berkeley Farms logo

- Barber's, Alabama, parts of Mississippi, Georgia and Florida
- Berkeley Farms, Northern California and Northern Nevada: 1910–2020
- Broughton Foods, Southeast Ohio, Eastern Kentucky, Western Virginia and West Virginia. The company also operated a sub-plant in Charleston, West Virginia. Broughton Foods Company was formerly owned by Suiza Foods Company.
- Land O'Lakes milk (licensed brand), Montana, North Dakota, South Dakota, Nebraska, Minnesota, Iowa and Wisconsin
- Liberty Dairy, Grand Rapids, Michigan
- Louis Trauth Dairy, Kentucky and Ohio
- McArthur Dairy, South Florida
- Meadow Brook, Pennsylvania and New York
- Meadow Gold Dairy, Hawaii and Nebraska
- Melody Farms, Detroit, which itself had previously acquired R.W. Wilson & Sons, Detroit, Michigan
- Model Dairy, Northern Nevada
- H. Myer Dairy Company, Cincinnati, Ohio
- Swiss Dairy, California

In October 2010, Dean Foods announced it was retiring the Schepps brand for dairy products in the Dallas, Texas area in favor of their Oak Farms brand. The Schepps brand had been in the Dallas market since 1942.

== Acquisitions and spinoffs ==
In 2005, Dean Specialty Foods was spun off from Dean Foods as Bay Valley Foods, LLC, a division of TreeHouse Foods, Inc. In June 2005, TreeHouse Foods started trading on the New York Stock Exchange with a ticker of THS.

In August 2006, Dean Foods acquired Jilbert's Dairy, a 70-year-old family business near Marquette, Michigan.

Dean Food's TofuTown brand was acquired by the Hain Celestial Group in June 2007.

In December, Dean Foods bought the Wells Dairy milk plant in Le Mars, Iowa. The plant manufactured Blue Bunny ice cream.

Dean Foods purchased Alpro in 2009 for an estimated US$455 million, making it a "global leader in soy beverages". At that time, the company was restructured and a number of subsidiaries were sold, including Rachel's Organic.

Dean Foods spun off WhiteWave Foods, the maker of Horizon Organic and Silk Soymilk, as a standalone company in May 2013.

== Legal proceedings ==
In March 2005, the Cornucopia Institute filed a complaint with the United States Department of Agriculture (USDA) alleging that their Horizon Organic subsidiary was violating "organic livestock management" standards.

On May 12, 2008, the Cornucopia Institute filed a second complaint with the USDA again alleging that Deans Foods had violated federal organic regulations requiring access to pasture and fresh grass for their dairy cows.

Silk brand soy milk was made using organic soybeans until early 2009, when Dean Foods switched to conventional soybeans while maintaining the same UPC barcodes and prices on the Silk products and replacing the word “organic” with “natural” on the product's packaging, prompting the Cornucopia Institute to file complaints that the company had not properly notified retailers or consumers.

Foremost Farms USA, a cooperative of over 2,000 dairy farmers in several mid-western states, sold its Wisconsin milk processing plants to Dean Foods in 2009. In January 2010, the US Department of Justice and the state attorneys general's office of Wisconsin and Michigan, filed a lawsuit objecting to the purchase and alleged that it created a monopolizing provider. Dean Foods announced it was contesting the complaint.

In 2011, a class action suit was brought against Dean Foods over health claims made on the packaging of Horizon Organic Milk. In 2012, Dean Foods contributed $253,950 to fund opposition to California's ballot Proposition 37 which would require mandatory labeling of foods containing genetically modified ingredients.

In 2017, bettor and stock trader Billy Walters was convicted of insider trading in Dean shares in Federal court. Walters' source of non-public information was company director Thomas C. Davis employing a prepaid cell phone nicknamed "the Batphone" and, sometimes, the code words "Dallas Cowboys" for the company name. The case involved profits or avoided losses of $40 million from 2008 to 2014. The verdict was to be appealed according to Walters' lawyer.

== See also ==
- FTC v. Dean Foods Co., 1966 decision of the US Supreme Court
