= Cornucopia Institute =

American non-profit organization

The Cornucopia Institute is a national food and farm policy 501(c)(3) non-profit watchdog group with the stated goal of upholding the integrity of organic, local, and other forms of alternative agriculture.

== History ==
The Cornucopia Institute was founded in 2004 by Mark Kastel and Will Fantel. The Institute was founded to advocate for family farm protections and rights, food label transparency, organic agriculture standards, antitrust enforcement in agriculture, and federal farm and food policy reform.

== Consumer reports ==
Cornucopia produces reports and consumer scorecards that rate organic and natural brands of eggs, pet food, yogurt, soy foods, and breakfast cereals. They have also reported on the food additives carrageenan and DHA. In addition, Cornucopia has released white papers and reports covering current issues in organics such as a Hydroponics White Paper (2015), a Children’s Health Report (2015), and an Organic Watergate White Paper (2011). They also have produced a scorecard of organic certifiers, the organizations responsible for ensuring organic producers have followed the USDA’s organic rules.

== Factory condition monitoring ==
Cornucopia has exposed factory-farming conditions at organic egg production facilities confining tens of thousands of hens per building with inadequate outdoor access, and at organic dairies, where thousands of cows have no access to pasture in concentrated animal feeding operations (CAFO). Their ongoing “flyover project” has resulted in high-resolution aerial photography of unethical organic livestock facilities across the country.

== Legal complaints ==
The Cornucopia Institute also takes legal action on organic integrity issues, for instance having filed complaint against Dean Foods (White Wave), based on the use of the term organic. It challenged a USDA marketing order related to almonds, and has filed complaints with the USDA about certain practices of Aurora Organic Dairy, Horizon Organic, Silk, and others, as they relate to organic standards and regulations. In 2016, Cornucopia filed suit against the USDA alleging that agribusiness personnel were improperly appointed to seats reserved for organic farmers on the National Organic Standards Board.
