= Brown Cow (yogurt) =

American yogurt brand

- Product type: Yogurt
- Current owner: Stonyfield Farm, Inc.
- Country: United States
- Introduced: 1975; 51 years ago
- Previous owners: Danone
- Website: browncowfarm.com

Brown Cow is an American brand of yogurt produced in Londonderry, New Hampshire. The company offers a range of "cream top" yogurt—when the milk used to make yogurt has not been homogenized, a layer of cream rises to the top, forming a rich yogurt cream.

Brown Cow yogurt claims to use Non-GMO project verified ingredients, with no artificial ingredients or preservatives, and uses only whole milk from cows who have not been treated with artificial growth hormones.

== History ==
Brown Cow was founded in 1975, on a small family farm in Ithaca, New York. "Lily" was the name of the original brown cow from whom the company took its name. In 1989, Brown Cow moved to California. Later, in 2003, Stonyfield Farm, which was largely owned by Danone, acquired Brown Cow. In 2014 Brown Cow (Danone) closed its plant in Antioch California and moved operations to Fort Worth Texas. Today, Brown Cow yogurt production moved to Londonderry, New Hampshire, where Stonyfield Farm, Inc. has its headquarters.
