= John Locke (author) =

American writer

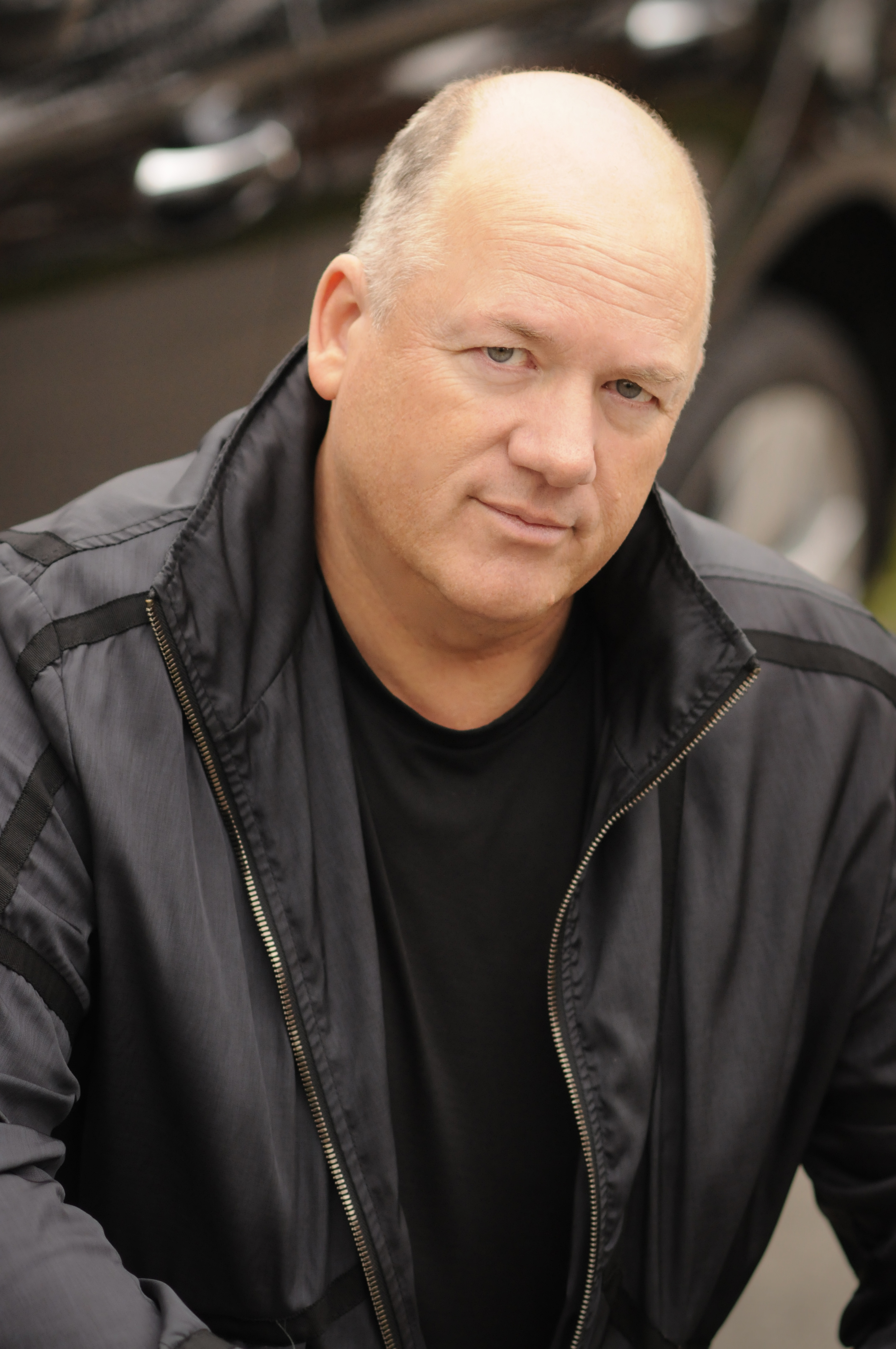
- Born: 1951 (age 74–75); San Juan, Puerto Rico
- Citizenship: United States
- Education: Northwestern State University
- Occupation: Novelist
- Known for: Donovan Creed thriller series, Emmett Love western series
- Spouse: Annie
- Children: 5
- Website: donovancreed.com

John Locke (born 1951) is a writer and novelist who was the eighth author—and first self-published author—to sell over one million eBooks on Amazon.com. Locke is a New York Times best-selling author, and is best known for his Donovan Creed thriller series and Emmett Love Western series. His works are self-published worldwide. In the U.S., Locke's books are released through Amazon's Kindle Direct Publishing service. Locke's books have been translated into over 29 languages.

== Education and career ==
Locke was born in Puerto Rico to a Canadian military father and an American mother. He attended boarding school in Pennsylvania, and he has said that he first became interested in writing during elementary school, after being bitten by an ant. He wrote a short story titled "Ants Aren't Very Nice," which his teacher enjoyed so much that she read it to his class, and then had him read it to a higher class. Despite early interest, his career and most of his life involved no writing, focusing his energy instead on selling insurance and investing in real estate, where he made most of his fortune.

He attended college at Northwestern State University, in Natchitoches, LA, where he considered majoring in journalism; however, he decided to focus his studies elsewhere. He began singing for a rock band and working as a door-to-door insurance salesman, where he advanced to area vice president by the time he was 21 years old. Later he moved to Louisville, KY, and at 35 founded Freedom Life Insurance. This company grew to include nearly 7000 insurance agents in 34 states, and in 1995 he sold the company to become a private real-estate investor. Locke currently owns two insurance agencies and 13 shopping centers.

== Writing ==
Locke was the first self-published author in history to sell one million eBooks, making him one of only eight authors to sell this number of eBooks. (The other seven authors are Stieg Larsson, James Patterson, Nora Roberts, Charlaine Harris, Lee Child, Suzanne Collins, and Michael Connelly.) He releases his novels as eBooks via Amazon's Kindle Direct Publishing. Artwork and design of the books is done by Telemachus Press, a work-for-hire services company that charges a one-time fee and allows the author to retain 100% royalties.

Since he began publishing in 2010, Locke has sold more than 2 million eBooks, 1.5 million of which are from the Donovan Creed series. Every eBook he has published has gone on to become an Amazon best seller. In early 2011, the top two and four of the top 10 Amazon's Kindle bestsellers were Locke novels. In his book, How I Sold 1 Million eBooks in Five Months, Locke reported his novels selling at a rate of one every seven seconds.

The other seven authors to top one million in eBook sales sell their novels for upwards of $10.00. As Locke reported to the Daily Telegraph in 2011, "I put the most famous authors in the world in the position of having to prove their books were ten times better than mine." At this price, the author earns 35% royalties, as opposed to 70% if the author were to price the book between $2.99 and $9.99.

Locke hit upon a successful method of selling his books after an unsuccessful attempt at advertising his first novels. He describes his system in How I Sold 1 Million eBooks in Five Months. In this work, Locke uses the term "Loyalty Transference" to describe the act of transferring a reader's loyalty from one concept or idea to another, and advises would-be writers to seek out audiences that relate to their own blogging content and style. Through the use of social media and blogging, Locke states he has the ability to create large amounts of publicity through his core group of loyal readers, around 100,000 by his estimate.

In August 2011, several traditional publishers were interested in offering Locke a publishing contract, but he instead worked out a mass-market paperback distribution agreement with Simon & Schuster, where they could sell physical copies of his novels at large retailers. This deal was finished by February 2012, and made Locke the first author to sign a specific distribution deal with Simon & Schuster. He retained all editorial rights, and control of design, content, and pricing.

== Controversy ==
In August 2012, The New York Times revealed that John Locke had paid an online service to write reviews of his books, in order to artificially boost sales.

== Authorship ==
=== Donovan Creed novels ===
Donovan Creed, the main character of the Locke's most popular series, is a former CIA assassin.

1. Lethal People (2010) (Telemachus Press)
2. Lethal Experiment (2010) (Telemachus Press)
3. Saving Rachel (2010) (Telemachus Press) New York Times Best Seller
4. Now & Then (2010) (Telemachus Press)
5. Wish List (2010) (Telemachus Press) (also mass market print edition, self-published from Locke Press, scheduled for 2012)
6. A Girl Like You (2011) (Telemachus Press)
7. Vegas Moon (2011) (Telemachus Press)
8. The Love You Crave (2011) (Telemachus Press)
9. Maybe (2011) (Telemachus Press)
10. Callie's Last Dance (2012) (Telemachus Press)
11. Because We Can (2013) (Telemachus Press)

=== Emmett Love Western novels ===
- Follow the Stone (2011) (Telemachus Press)
- Don't Poke the Bear (2011) (Telemachus Press)
- Emmett & Gentry (2011) (Telemachus Press)
- Goodbye, Enorma (2013) (Telemachus Press)
- Rag Soup (2015) (Telemachus Press)
- Spider Rain (2016) (John Locke Books, LLC)

=== Other works ===
- Casting Call (2014) (Telemachus Press)

==== Novels ====
- Call Me! (2011) (Telemachus Press)
- Promise You Won't Tell! (2012) (Telemachus Press)
- Bad Doctor (2012) (Telemachus Press)
- BOX (2012) (Telemachus Press)
- Kill Jill (2012) (Telemachus Press)
- A Kiss For Luck (2013) (Telemachus Press)

==== Nonfiction ====
- How I Sold 1 Million eBooks in Five Months (2011) (Telemachus Press)

== Awards and recognition ==
Locke was named Second Act magazine's best-second-act-reinvention.

In December 2012, Time Magazine named Locke as one of the "Stars of the DIY-Publishing Era."

== Personal life ==
Locke lives in Louisville, Kentucky.
