= Tuscan Dairy Farms =

American dairy company

- Type: Private
- Founded: 1918; 108 years ago
- Founder: Louis Borinsky
- Headquarters: Roebling, NJ, U.S.
- Area served: New Jersey and the New York metropolitan area
- Products: Milk
- Parent: Dairy Farmers of America
- Website: tuscandairy.com

Tuscan Dairy Farms is an American dairy company, headquartered in Roebling, New Jersey, and owned by Dairy Farmers of America.

== History and operations ==
Founded in 1918 by Louis Borinsky, Tuscan Dairy Farms began as a family-run distribution operation, delivering dairy products door to door on routes throughout Union and Essex counties in New Jersey. Tuscan Dairy Farms produces fluid milk and dairy by-products which are available to supermarkets, general wholesale, and food service outlets throughout the Northeastern United States.

Tuscan Dairy Farms reached internet phenomenon status on August 9, 2006, when The New York Times published an article relating to users of YTMND.com leaving humorous reviews on a gallon of "Tuscan Whole Milk" available on Amazon.com.

== See also ==
- Agriculture in the United States
- Dairy farming
- List of dairy product companies in the United States
