= Alpro =

Food company

- Type: Subsidiary
- Industry: Food
- Founded: May 27, 1980; 46 years ago
- Founder: Vandemoortele Groep
- Headquarters: Ghent, Belgium
- Products: Plant milk; Dairy alternatives
- Parent: Danone
- Website: alpro.com

Alpro is a Belgian food industry company founded in 1980, specializing in the manufacture and marketing of plant-based food products. Since 2017, it has been part of the French group Danone following the acquisition of WhiteWave Foods.

Initially focused on soy-based products, the company has expanded its portfolio to include oats, almonds, hazelnuts, rice, coconut and cashews. Marketed mainly under the Alpro, Provamel and Belsoy brands, its product range includes plant-based drinks, plant-based yogurt alternatives, desserts and cooking products.

In 2026, Alpro operates several industrial sites in Western Europe, notably in Wevelgem, Belgium; Kettering, United Kingdom; and Issenheim and Villecomtal-sur-Arros, France.

== History ==
=== Origins and development ===
After several years of research aimed at improving soy-processing methods and developing products for human consumption, Alpro was founded in 1980 in Ghent. During the 1980s, it expanded its production capacity and gradually broadened its distribution across Western Europe. The company transferred its industrial operations to Wevelgem, Belgium, where a new production site was commissioned at the end of the decade.

In the 1990s, the company diversified its product portfolio, which had initially focused on soy-based drinks, by launching plant-based yogurt alternatives and other plant-based foods. In 1996, it acquired the Sojinal production site in Issenheim, France. Three years later, it began construction of a factory in Burton Latimer, United Kingdom, to support its growth in the British market.

=== Acquisition by Dean Foods and integration into WhiteWave Foods ===
In June 2009, the Belgian group Vandemoortele sold Alpro to the American company Dean Foods for approximately €325 million. The transaction brought the European brands Alpro and Provamel together with Silk, a North American brand specializing in soy-based foods. The acquisition formed part of Dean Foods’ strategy to strengthen its presence in the rapidly growing plant-based and organic products market in the United States and Europe.

At the end of 2012, Dean Foods grouped its plant-based and organic activities into a separate company, The WhiteWave Foods Company, which was listed on the New York Stock Exchange.

Under WhiteWave ownership, Alpro accelerated the diversification of its offering. Historically focused on soy, the brand developed new ranges based on almonds, hazelnuts, oats, rice and coconut, supporting the growth of the European plant-based food and beverages market.

In July 2013, Dean Foods divested its entire remaining stake in WhiteWave, which then became an independent company.

=== Acquisition by Danone ===
In July 2016, Danone announced the acquisition of WhiteWave Foods, a U.S. company specializing in organic and plant-based products, for approximately $12.5 billion including debt. At the time, it was the French group’s largest acquisition since its purchase of Numico in 2007.

The transaction was approved by the competition authorities and completed on 12 April 2017. Following the acquisition, the North American operations of Danone and WhiteWave were combined into a new entity called DanoneWave, while Alpro was integrated into Danone’s European operations.

The acquisition of WhiteWave strengthened Danone’s presence in the plant-based products market, a segment in which Alpro already held a significant position in Europe. At the time of its acquisition, the company marketed its products in most European countries under the Alpro and Provamel brands.

== See also ==
- List of vegetarian and vegan companies
